= Cameron Mitchell filmography =

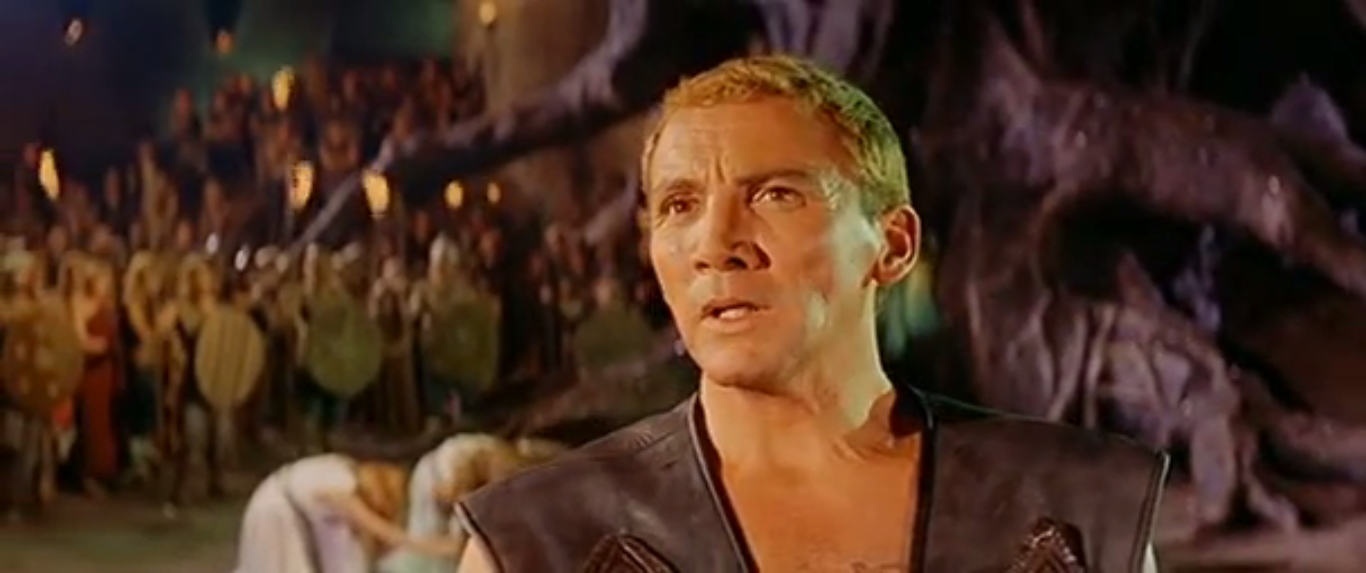
Mitchell as Eron in Erik the Conqueror

A complete filmography of Cameron Mitchell from 1945 to 2018.

== Films ==
Year	Title	Role	Director	Notes
1945	The Last Installment	Clyde Peeler	Walter Hart	Crime Does Not Pay short subject
1945	The Hidden Eye	Electrician	Richard Whorf	Scenes deleted
1945	What Next, Corporal Hargrove?	Joe Lupot	Richard Thorpe	
1945	They Were Expendable	Ensign George Cross	John Ford	
1946	A Letter for Evie	Joe the wounded soldier	Jules Dassin	Uncredited
1947	The Mighty McGurk	Johnny Burden	John Waters	
1947	High Barbaree	Lt. Joe Moore	Jack Conway	
1947	Cass Timberlane	Eino Roskinen	George Sidney	
1948	Tenth Avenue Angel	Narrator/Visitor to Tenth Avenue	Roy Rowland	Uncredited
1948	Homecoming	Sgt. 'Monk' Monkevickz	Mervyn LeRoy	
1948	Leather Gloves	Dave Collins	William Asher; Richard Quine	First feature lead role
1948	Adventures of Gallant Bess	Ted Daniels	Lew Landers	
1948	Command Decision	Lt. Ansel Goldberg	Sam Wood	
1951	Smuggler's Gold	Mike Sloan	William Berke	
1951	Flight to Mars	Steve Abbott	Lesley Selander	
1951	Man in the Saddle	George Vird	Andre DeToth	
1951	Death of a Salesman	Happy Loman	László Benedek	Reprising his Broadway role
1952	Japanese War Bride	Art Sterling	King Vidor	
1952	Okinawa	'Grip' McCleary	Leigh Jason	
1952	The Outcasts of Poker Flat	Ryker	Joseph M. Newman	
1952	The Sellout	Randy Stauton	Gerald Mayer	
1952	Les Misérables	Marius Pontmercy	Lewis Milestone	
1952	Pony Soldier	Konah	Joseph M. Newman	
1953	Man on a Tightrope	Joe Vosdek	Elia Kazan	
1953	Powder River	Mitch Hardin	Louis King	
1953	The Robe	Jesus (voice)	Henry Koster	Uncredited
1953	How to Marry a Millionaire	Tom Brookman	Jean Negulesco	
1954	Hell and High Water	"Ski" Brodski	Samuel Fuller	
1954	Gorilla at Large	Joey Matthews	Harmon Jones	3D film
1954	Garden of Evil	Luke Daly	Henry Hathaway	
1954	Désirée	Joseph Bonaparte	Henry Koster	
1955	Strange Lady in Town	Lt. David Garth	Mervyn LeRoy	
1955	Love Me or Leave Me	Harry Myrl "Johnny" Alderman	Charles Vidor	
1955	House of Bamboo	Griff	Samuel Fuller	
1955	The Tall Men	Clint Allison	Raoul Walsh	
1955	The View from Pompey's Head	Michael "Mickey" / "Mico" Higgins	Philip Dunne	
1956	Carousel	Jigger Craigin	Henry King	
1956	Tension at Table Rock	Fred Miller	Charles Marquis Warren	
1957	All Mine to Give	Robert Eunson	Allen Reisner	
1957	Monkey on My Back	Barney Ross	Andre DeToth	
1957	Escapade in Japan	Dick Saunders	Arthur Lubin	
1957	No Down Payment	Troy Boone	Martin Ritt	
1959	Face of Fire	Ned Trescott	Albert Band	
1959	Inside the Mafia	Tony Ledo	Edward L. Cahn	
1959	Pier 5, Havana	Steve Daggett	Edward L. Cahn	
1959	As the Sea Rages	Psarathanas	Horst Hächler	German language film
1960	Three Came to Kill	Marty Brill	Edward L. Cahn	
1961	The Last of the Vikings	Harald	Giacomo Gentilomo; Mario Bava (uncredited)	Italian language film
1961	The Unstoppable Man	James Kennedy	Terry Bishop	British film
1961	Erik the Conqueror	Eron	Mario Bava	Italian language film
1962	Dulcinea	El Renegado	Vicente Escrivá	Spanish language film
1962	Caesar the Conqueror	Julius Caesar	Tanio Boccia	Italian language film
1962	Attack of the Normans	Wilfrid, Duke of Saxony	Giuseppe Vari	Italian language film
1963	The Black Duke	Cesare Borgia	Pino Mercanti	Italian language film
1964	Blood and Black Lace	Massimo Morlacchi	Mario Bava	
1964	Dog Eat Dog	Lylle Corbett	Richard E. Cunha; Gustav Gavrin	German language film
1964	The Last Gun	Bill / Jim Hart	Sergio Bergonzelli	Italian language film
1964	Minnesota Clay	Minnesota Clay	Sergio Corbucci	Italian language film
1966	Knives of the Avenger	Rurik / Helmut	Mario Bava	Italian language film
1966	Ride in the Whirlwind	Vern	Monte Hellman	
1966	In the Shadow of the Eagles	Tribune Marcus Ventidius	Ferdinando Baldi	Italian language film
1967	Maneater of Hydra	Baron von Weser	Mel Welles	German/Italian language film
1967	The Treasure of Makuba	Coogan	José María Elorrieta	Spanish language film
1967	Hombre	Sheriff Frank Braden	Martin Ritt	
1967	Massacre in the Black Forest	Consul Aulus Sessina	Ferdinando Baldi; Rudolf Nussgruber	German language film
1968	Autopsy of a Ghost	Prof. Moléculo Pulido	Ismael Rodríguez	Spanish language film
1969	Nightmare in Wax	Vince Rinaud	Bud Townsend	
1969	The Dream of Hamish Mose	Captain Eli	Cameron Mitchell	Only directing credit, unreleased
1970	The Rebel Rousers	Paul Collier	Martin B. Cohen	Filmed in 1967
1971	The Killers	Col. Stewart	Ewing Miles Brown	
1971	The Taste of the Savage	Huck	Alberto Mariscal	Spanish language film
1972	Cutter	Riggs	Richard Irving	
1972	Buck and the Preacher	Deshay	Sidney Poitier	
1972	Slaughter	A.W. Price	Jack Starrett	
1973	The Big Game	Bruno Carstens	Robert Day	
1973	Medusa	Bruno Carstens	Gordon Hessler	
1974	The Midnight Man	Quartz Willinger	Burt Lancaster	
1974	The Klansman	Butt Cutt Cates	Terence Young	
1975	Political Asylum	MacPherson	Manuel Zeceña Diéguez	Spanish language film
1976	Enforcer from Death Row	Superior Chief	Marshall M. Borden; Efren C. Piñon	
1976	Haunts	Carl	Herb Freed	
1977	Viva Knievel!	Barton	Gordon Douglas	
1978	Slavers	Da Silva	Jürgen Goslar	
1978	The Toolbox Murders	Vance Kingsley	Dennis Donnelly	
1978	Texas Detour	John Hunter	Howard Avedis	
1978	The Swarm	General Thompson	Irwin Allen	
1979	The Demon	Colonel Carson	Percival Rubens	
1979	Island of the Fishmen	Decker	Sergio Martino	Scenes added to US version
1979	The Hughes Mystery		Manuel Zeceña Diéguez	
1979	Supersonic Man	Dr. Gulik	Juan Piquer Simón	
1979	The Silent Scream	Lieutenant McGiver	Denny Harris	
1980	Turnover Smith	Colonel Simmons	Bernard L. Kowalski	
1980	Without Warning	Hunter	Greydon Clark	
1980	The Last Reunion	Sam Hacker	Jay Wetz	
1980	Cataclysm	Lt. Sterne	Phillip Marshak; Tom McGowan; Gregg G. Tallas	
1980	Captive	Gropper	Robert Emenegger; Allan Sandler	
1981	Texas Lightning	Karl Stover	Gary Graver	
1981	Frankenstein Island	Clay Jayson	Jerry Warren	
1981	The Guns and the Fury	Jack Piper	Tony Zarrindast	
1982	Kill Squad	Dutch	Patrick G. Donahue	
1982	Raw Force	Captain Harry Dodds	Edward D. Murphy	
1982	My Favorite Year	Karl "Boss" Rojeck	Richard Benjamin	
1982	Blood Link	Bud Waldo	Alberto De Martino	
1983	Dixie Ray Hollywood Star	The Lieutenant	Anthony Spinelli	Pornographic film
1984	Killpoint	Joe Marks	Frank Harris	
1984	Prince Jack	Gen. Edwin Walker	Bert Lovitt	
1984	Go for the Gold	Phillip Pritchard	Stuart F. Fleming	
1985	Night Train to Terror	The Lieutenant	Jay Schlossberg-Cohen	Segment: "The Case of Claire Hansen"; Reused footage from Cataclysm (1980)
1985	Mission Kill	Harry	David Winters	
1985	Terror on Tape	Video Store Clerk	Robert Worms	
1986	Low Blow	Yarakunda	Frank Harris	
1986	The Tomb	Dr. Howard Phillips	Fred Olen Ray	
1986	The Messenger	Police Capt. Carter	Fred Williamson	
1987	Hateman	Steve	Harry Hope	
1987	Nightforce	Sen. Adam Hansen	Lawrence David Foldes	
1987	From a Whisper to a Scream	Sergeant Gallan	Jeff Burr	Segment: "Four Soldiers"
1987	Hollywood Cop	Capt. Bonano	Amir Shervan	
1987	Deadly Prey	Jamie's father	David A. Prior	
1987	Rage to Kill	Sergeant Bill Miller	David Winters	
1987	Code Name Vengeance	Dutch	David Winters	
1988	Mutant War	Reinhart Rex	Brett Piper	
1988	Space Mutiny	Cmdr. Alex Jansen	David Winters	
1988	Memorial Valley Massacre	Allen Sangster	Robert C. Hughes	
1988	Trapped Alive	John Adams	Leszek Burzynski	
1989	Action U.S.A.	Frankie Navarro	John Stewart	
1989	No Justice	Mayor Johnson	Fred H. Dresch; Richard Wayne Martin	
1989	Terror in Beverly Hills	Captain Stills	John Myhers	
1989	Terror Night	Detective Sanders	Nick Marino	
1990	Easy Kill	Eddie	Josh Spencer	
1990	Return to Justice	Wayne	Vincent G. Cox	
1990	Crossing the Line	Sheriff Williams	Gary Graver	
1990	Demon Cop	Ravenwood Asylum Doctor	Rocco Karega; Hal Miles	
1995	Jack-O	Dr. Cadaver	Steve Latshaw	Recycled footage from Demon Cop
2018	The Other Side of the Wind	Matt Zimmer	Orson Welles	Filmed 1970-76

== Television ==
Year	Title	Role	Notes
1948	The Philco Television Playhouse	Pvt. Kenneth Dowey	1 episode, "The Old Lady Shows Her Medals"
1955	The 20th Century Fox Hour	Donald Martin	episode: "The Ox-Bow Incident"
1955	The 20th Century Fox Hour	Robert Cosick	episode: Man on the Ledge
1958	Colt.45	Dr. Allen McMurdo	1 episode, "Point of Honor"
1958	Dick Powell's Zane Grey Theatre	Dr. Allen McMurdo	1 episode, "The Doctor Keeps a Promise"
1959	Wagon Train	Duke LeMay	1 episode, "The Duke LeMay Story"
1959	The Untouchables	Johnny Paycheck	1 episode, "Ain't we Got Fun"
1959	Dick Powell's Zane Grey Theatre	Charlie Patch	episode: "The Trail Incident"
1959	Dick Powell's Zane Grey Theatre	Jim Goad	episode: "The Grubstake"
1960	Bonanza	Frederick Kyle	1 episode, "A House Divided"
1962	The Beachcomber	John Lackland	main character, 39 episodes
1966	Daniel Boone	George Rogers Clark	episode: The Fifth Man
1966	Daniel Boone	James Dorsey	episode: The Loser's Race
1967-1971	The High Chaparral	Buck Cannon	main character, 97 episodes
1970	The Andersonville Trial	Maj. Gen. Lew Wallace	TV movie
1971	McCloud	Robert Devlin	1 episode, "Somebody's Out to Get Jennie"
1971	The F.B.I.	John Norcross	1 episode, "Bitter Harbor"
1971	Mod Squad	Karl Milligan	1 episode, "Home is the Streets"
1971	Thief	Charles Herrod	TV movie
1971	The Reluctant Heroes	Sgt. Marion Bryce	TV movie
1972	McMillan & Wife	Harry Hastings	1 episode, "Night of the Wizard"
1972	Night Gallery	Pete Tuttle	episode: "Finnegan's Flight"
1972	Night Gallery	Michael J. Saunders	episode: "Green Fingers/The Funeral/The Tune in Dan's Cafe"
1972	Ironside	Kent	1 episode, "Buddy Can you Spare a Dime?"
1972	Alias Smith and Jones	Wyatt Earp	1 episode, "Which Way to the O.K. Corral?"
1973	The Magician	Walter C. Marsh/Canfield	1 episode, "Illusion in Terror"
1973	Hawkins	Jake Parkins	1 episode, "Murder in Movieland"
1973	Mission Impossible	Matthew Drake	1 episode, "The Fountain"
1973	Ironside	Graham	1 episode, "The Helping Hand"
1973	Police Story	Arnie Holcombe	1 episode, "Line of Fire"
1973	The Stranger	George Benedict	TV movie
1974	Hawaii Five-O	Bowman	1 episode, "Welcome to our Branch Office"
1974	Ironside	Kincaid	1 episode, "What's New with Mark"
1974	Amy Prentiss	Satin Charlie	1 episode, "The Desperate World of Jane Doe"
1974	Hitchhike!	Hadley	TV movie
1974	Gunsmoke	Chauncy Demon	1 episode, "The Iron Man"
1974	The Hanged Man	Lew Halleck	TV movie
1974	The Girl on the Late, Late Show	Norman Wilder	TV movie
1974	Death in Space	Arnold Chester	TV movie
1975	The Swiss Family Robinson	Jeremiah Worth	Pilot episode
1975	S.W.A.T.	Bo Prichard	1 episode, "Jungle War"
1975	Cannon	Peter DeAba	1 episode, "The Investigator"
1975	Movin' On	Casey's father	1 episode, "Landslide"
1976	Bronk	Mankowski	1 episode, "The Vigilante"
1976	Flood!	Sam Adams	TV movie
1976	The Quest	Shadrack Peltzer	Pilot episode
1977	Testimony of Two Men	Jeremiah Hadley	TV mini-series
1977	Hunter	Turnbull	1 episode, "UFM 13"
1977	Quincy, M.E.	Dan Granger	1 episode, "Last of the Dinosaurs"
1977	The Hostage Heart	Arnold Stade	TV movie
1977	Police Story	Taggart	1 episode, "Stigma"
1978	Fantasy Island	Raoul	episode: "Return to Fantasy Island"
1978	Fantasy Island	Sgt. Broylan	episode: The Big Dipper/The Pirate
1978	Vega$	Willie 'Sparrow' Salter	1 episode, "Lady Ice"
1978	How the West Was Won	Coulee John Brinkerhoff	TV mini-series, 3 episodes
1978	The Scalp Merchant	Riley	TV movie
1978	The Bastard	Captain Plummer	TV movie
1978	Greatest Heroes of the Bible	Assurabi	1 episode, "Joshua and the Battle of Jericho"
1979	Fantasy Island	Eddie Collins	1 episode, "The Chain Gang/The Boss"
1979	Hawaii Five O	Tom Riorden	1 episode, "A Very Personal Matter"
1979	Hanging by a Thread	Lawton	TV movie
1979	Charlie's Angels	Frank Desmond	1 episode, "Avenging Angel"
1980	Vega$	Zinberg	1 episode, "Siege of the Desert Inn"
1980	Charlie's Angels	Tom Granger	1 episode, "To See An Angel Die"
1980	OHMS	Wilbur	TV movie
1980	Mrs. Columbo	Captain Jack	1 episode, "Love, On Instant Replay"
1981	The Perfect Woman	Mordo	TV movie
1981	Magnum, P.I.	Captain Charles Cathcart, U.S.N. Retired	1 episode, "Adelaide"
1981	Fantasy Island	Sheriff Matt	1 episode, "Devil and Mr. Roarke/Ziegfeld Girls/Kid Corey Rides Again"
1981	The Incredible Hulk	Eddie Cain	1 episode, "Goodbye Eddie Cain"
1983	Kenny Rogers as The Gambler: The Adventure Continues	Colonel Greeley	TV movie, part of The Gambler series
1984	Knight Rider	Bernie Mitchell	1 episode, "Diamonds Aren't a Girls Best Friend"
1984	Hardcastle and McCormick	Mayor Broadmore	2 episodes, "The Homecoming"
1984	Partners in Crime	Duke	1 episode, "Duke"
1984	The Fall Guy	Bronc Munson	1 episode, "Private Eyes" (S04.EP06)
1985	Murder, She Wrote	Dr. Aaron Kramer	1 episode, "Murder to a Jazz Beat"
1986	Simon & Simon	Ben Coffield	1 episode, "Something for Sarah"
1986	Dream West	Commander Robert Stackton	TV mini-series
1987	Matlock	Lane Lockletter	1 episode, "The Network"
1988	Mama's Boy	Matt	1 episode, "Hamlet"

== Theatre ==
Year	Title	Role	Venue	Notes
1939	Jeremiah	Merchant's Nephew	Guild Theatre, New York	Broadway debut
1940	The Taming of the Shrew	Ensemble member	Alvin Theatre, New York	
1941	The Trojan Women	Soldier of Talthybius	Cort Theatre, New York	
1949-1950	Death of a Salesman	Happy Loman	Morosco Theatre, New York	Won Theatre World Award
1950	Southern Exposure	John Salguod	Biltmore Theatre, New York	
1970	Les Blancs	Charlie Morris	Longacre Theatre, New York	
1978	The November People	Mitch	Billy Rose Theatre, New York	
