= James Lew =

American martial artist, stunt performer and actor (1952–2026)

- Born: James Jene Fae Lew; September 6, 1952; Escalon, California, U.S.
- Died: August 23, 2026 (aged 73); Los Angeles, California, U.S.
- Occupations: Stunt performer, stunt coordinator, actor
- Spouse(s): Pamela Gidley (m. 2005; div. 2008) Jordanna Potter (m. 2014)
- Relatives: Ryan Potter (stepson)

James Jene Fae Lew (September 6, 1952 – August 23, 2026) was an American martial artist, stuntman and actor. He made 80 on-screen film and television appearances and 46 more as a stunt coordinator or stunt double. Lew won a Primetime Emmy Award for Outstanding Stunt Coordination for his work on the series Luke Cage.

== Early life and career ==
Of Chinese descent, Lew was born James Jene Fae Lew in Escalon, California, on September 6, 1952. He was raised in South Los Angeles. Lew began studying martial arts at the age of 14, when he began taking classes in Tang Soo Do and Choy Li Fut. He was practiced in Bak Mei Pai and Five Animals kung fu, Tae Kwon Do, Jeet Kune Do, Hapkido, boxing and submission grappling. In the 1970s, he co-founded Sil Lung Kung Fu demo team with Al Leong and Douglas Lim Wong, and won several championships in martial arts forms.

An early role for Lew was as a guard in the John Cassavetes 1976 film, The Killing of a Chinese Bookie.

Lew had a role in Killpoint, an action film directed by Frank Harris and starring Leo Fong, Richard Roundtree, Cameron Mitchell and Stack Pierce.

In 2017, he acted in the sci-fi film Star Raiders: The Adventures of Saber Raine, directed by Mark Steven Grove and starring Casper Van Dien, Cynthia Rothrock, Sara Salazar, and Tyler Weaver Jr.

== Personal life and death ==
Lew was married to Pamela Gidley from 2005 until their divorce in 2008. He married Jordanna Alex Potter (née Glaskin) in 2014. Lew was the stepfather of actor Ryan Potter, who portrayed Gar Logan/Beast Boy on the HBO Max series Titans.

Lew died in Los Angeles from congestive heart failure on August 23, 2026, at the age of 73.

== Books ==
- The Art of Stretching and Kicking (2018), ISBN 978-0934489102

== Selected filmography ==
- 1976 The Killing of a Chinese Bookie as Asian Guard (uncredited)
- 1976 Enforcer from Death Row as Karate Fighter
- 1977 Big Time as Karate Instructor
- 1979 Young Dragon as Shao Lung
- 1983 Going Berserk as Kung Fu Fighter
- 1984 Killpoint as Nighthawk's Gunman #1
- 1985 Ninja Turf as Chan
- 1986 Big Trouble in Little China as Chang Sing #1
- 1987 Steele Justice as Mob Thug #5 (uncredited)
- 1988 Action Jackson as Martial Arts Instructor
- 1989 Ninja Academy as Ninja Trainer
- 1989 Savage Beach as Agent #1
- 1989 Best of the Best as Sae Jin Kwon
- 1990 Aftershock as Mr. James
- 1990 China Cry as Kickboxer Instructor
- 1990 Guns as Ninja #1
- 1991 The Perfect Weapon as Crewcut
- 1991 Night of the Warrior as Hector Sabatei
- 1991 Do or Die as Lew
- 1991 Showdown in Little Tokyo as Yoshida's Man (uncredited)
- 1991 Double Impact as Unknown
- 1992 Rapid Fire as Tau's Man At Laundry (uncredited)
- 1992 Ulterior Motives as Yakuza #5
- 1992 Dark Vengeance as 'Mantis'
- 1992 A Mission to Kill as Viet Cong (uncredited)
- 1992 Mission of Justice as Akiro
- 1993 American Ninja V as 'Viper'
- 1993 Hot Shots! Part Deux as Kick Boxer Opponent
- 1993 Undercover Blues as Novacek's Man
- 1993 Showdown as Hit Man
- 1994 On Deadly Ground as Mercenary At Aegis 1 (uncredited)
- 1994 Ring of Steel as Asian Fighter
- 1994 The Shadow as Mongol
- 1994 Red Sun Rising as Jaho
- 1994 Timecop as Knife #1
- 1994 Deadly Target as Guard #2 (uncredited)
- 1994 Cage II as Chin
- 1995 Ballistic as Woo
- 1995 Midnight Man as Prince Samarki
- 1995 Under Siege 2: Dark Territory as Mercenary (uncredited)
- 1995 Excessive Force II: Force on Force as Lee
- 1995 The Immortals as Asian Man
- 1996 Night Hunter as Tom Cutter
- 1996 Balance of Power (1996) as Shinji Takamura
- 1996 Escape from L.A. as Saigon Shadows Gang Member (uncredited)
- 1996 For Life or Death as Kaan Woo
- 1996 Robo Warriors as Darius
- 1996 Fox Hunt as 'Kung Fu' Lew
- 1997 Buffy the Vampire Slayer as Vampire
- 1997 The Girl Gets Moe as Brez
- 1997 Red Corner as Unknown
- 1997 High Voltage as Harry
- 1998 The Replacement Killers as Bodyguard
- 1998 Boogie Boy as Jason
- 1998 Safe House as Asian (uncredited)
- 1998 Lethal Weapon 4 as Freighter's Captain
- 1998 Rush Hour as Juntao's Man In Los Angeles (uncredited)
- 1999 Clubland as Lipton T's Sidekick
- 2000 Deep Core as Lou Chang
- 2000 Traffic as DEA Agent At CalTrans
- 2001 Rush Hour 2 as Triad Gangster (uncredited)
- 2002 The Amanda Show as Nikko
- 2002 Outside the Law as Cho Sung
- 2002 The Real Deal as Black Belt
- 2003 Paris as Mr. Fue
- 2003 Sin as Leo Thamaree
- 2004 The Perfect Party as Daddy
- 2006 18 Fingers of Death! as Buford Lee
- 2006 The Hitman Chronicles as Draga
- 2007 Pirates of the Caribbean: At World's End as Asian Pirate (uncredited)
- 2007 Rush Hour 3 as Triad Assassin (uncredited)
- 2008 Superhero Movie as Shaolin Monk (uncredited)
- 2008 Tropic Thunder as Flaming Dragon Member At Compound (uncredited)
- 2009 Star Trek as Romulan (uncredited)
- 2009 The Carbon Copy as Thug
- 2009 Angel of Death as Tommy
- 2009 Ballistica as Chinese Guard #1
- 2009 Nephilim as Unknown
- 2010 Chuck as Anad Chenerad
- 2010 Taken by Force as Choy
- 2010 Inception as Unknown
- 2012 The Girl from the Naked Eye as Eddie
- 2012 Safe as Underground Casino Guard (uncredited)
- 2012 Sleeping Dogs as Sifu Kwok (voice)
- 2012 Battleship as Unknown
- 2013 G.I. Joe: Retaliation as Chinese Leader
- 2014 Bad Country as Doctor
- 2014 Tengu, The Immortal Blade as Asura
- 2015 Frankenstein as Hotel Manager
- 2016 Beyond the Game as Unknown
- 2016 Breakout as Captain Rusch
- 2017 Star Raiders: The Adventures of Saber Raine as Sinjin
- 2018 Cucuy: The Boogeyman as Beat Cop
- 2019 American Bistro as Angry Man #1
