= Diane Stevenett =

Canadian artist, singer, actress, and producer

- Born: June 16, 1954 (age 72); Lethbridge, Alberta, Canada
- Occupations: Producer, Actress, Singer, Artist
- Spouse: Frank Harris (m. 1980)
- Website: www.dianestevenett.com

Diane Stevenett (born June 16, 1954) is a Canadian artist, singer, actress and producer. Born in Lethbridge, Alberta, Canada, she was the eldest of nine children and grew up Innisfail, Alberta, a farming community. She moved to California; in 1980 she married movie director Frank Harris. She has worked in film production in the action film genre.

== Background ==
As an actress she has had roles in Mike Hammer, and in Low Blow with Leo Fong and Cameron Mitchell. As a singer she has performed with the Santa Barbara Revels over the years. Her brother Daryl Stevenett is a composer and musician.

== Film career ==
She has acted in a number of films in the 1980s. She is also the sister of composer and musician Daryl Stevenett. She appeared in some of Leo Fong's films in the 1980s. She served as Producer, Production Manager and Assistant Director to Frank Harris in Killpoint, a film that Starred Leo Fong, Cameron Mitchell, Richard Rountree, Hope Holiday and Stack Pierce. In 1986, she acted in Low Blow which she played the part of Joe Wong's secretary Diane. Also in 1986, she played the part of Maggie in The Patriot, another Frank Harris directed film, starring Leslie Nielsen, Gregg Henry, Michael J. Pollard, Jeff Conaway, Stack Pierce and Simone Griffith with a musical score by Jay Ferguson. She was also the producer of Lockdown, a 1990 film that starred Joe Estevez and Richard Lynch. And she also had a role in the film.

== Music and theater ==
In 2010, Diane was the Female Lead as Vesta Victoria in Christmas REVELS (Santa Barbara Revels) at the Lobero Theatre. She also performed at the Hamilton Music Awards in Ontario, November 21, 2010 singing "I Love To Make Things Grow" by Gene Lees. She presented a Lifetime Achievement Award for Gene Lees which was accepted in his honor by his niece. She has appeared with Brian Slotnick Lastrico at the Historic Lobero Theatre and the Granada Theater of Santa Barbara, California and the Center Stage Theatre in a stage production of The Little Prince. In 2013 she was the Santa Barbara Revels soloist for their The Spirits of Haddon Hall which was held at the Lobero Theatre.

== Art ==
She is largely responsible for the formation of the C.A.C (Cuyama Arts and Culture Foundation) in 2010. C.A.C is an organization which has the purpose of using the arts to bring together, artists, teachers and resources together with the purpose of helping the local elementary and high schools. It also benefits the people of Cuyama.

She was also an Arts Commissioner with The Santa Barbara County Arts Commission along with Michael Dawson and John Hood as a 5th district Arts Commissioner.

== Later years ==
In addition to mentoring young artists, Stevenett has been a resident artist in Santa Barbara for some years and is involved in local events such as the Solstice Parades.

== Filmography ==
Actor (film)
Title	Role	Director	Year	Notes #
Killpoint	Candy	Frank Harris	1984	As Diana Leigh
Low Blow	Diane (Joe Wong's secretary)	Frank Harris	1986	
The Patriot	Maggie	Frank Harris	1986	
Lockdown	District Attorney Parker	Frank harris	1990	Also producer
Clownation	Clown	Ryan McGuire	2011	Short

Television shows
Title	Episode	Role	Director	Year	Notes #
Star Search	Episode #2.12	Herself		1984	as Diana Leigh
Mike Hammer	Sex Trap	Shawna	James Frawley	1984	as Diana Leigh

Producer
Title	Year	Notes #
Killpoint	1984	
Lockdown	1990	

Misc
Title	Role	Year	Notes #
Killpoint	Production manager, assistant director	1984	
Catch the Heat	Sound: second unit, Los Angeles	1987	as Diane Stevenett-Harris
Girl Talk	Production manager, art director	1989	
