= Woody Farmer =

American professional wrestler and actor (1935–2012)

Personal information
- Born: December 25, 1935 Buchanan County, Virginia, United States
- Died: February 29, 2012 (aged 76) Union City, California, United States

Professional wrestling career
- Ring name: Woody Farmer
- Billed height: 6 ft 1 in (185 cm)
- Trained by: Ray Stevens

Woody Farmer (December 25, 1935 – February 29, 2012) was an American professional wrestler and actor.

== Early life ==
As a young man, Farmer joined the army and the workout schedule of the army led to him taking up wrestling as a hobby. It then became a career for him.

== Professional wrestling career ==
Farmer started out wrestling in the 1960s and was trained by Ray Stevens. His early wrestling days were spent on the Northern California, Hawaii and Las Vegas wrestling circuits.

In Phoenix on January 7, 1966, Farmer was beaten by Nikita Mulkovich. He was beaten again by Mulkovich on January 31. On October 2, 1970, Farmer and Tito Montez took on The Comancheros in Phoenix, but were beaten by them. On the 19th of that month, they beat The Comancheros.

In 1967 he wrestled for World Wide Wrestling Federation as a jobber.

In 1971, with partner Bobby Duncum, farmer defeated The Beast and Bulldog Brower and won the NWA Western States Tag Team Titles.

In 1980, Farmer was photographed at a gym for a publicity stunt with iconic stripper Carol Doda. From 1989 to 1992, Farmer was a promoter and achieved a degree of success in that field.

It was reported by the East Bay Times on February 15, 2007, that 71 year old Farmer, along with his son 43 year old son Shane Kody and 21 year old grandson Riot (both wrestlers) were to wrestle another three man tag team for the Night of Champions on the 24th of that month. On February 24 for Bay Wrestling Federation in Alameda, California, he teamed with his son Shane Kody and his grandson Riot defeating Boom Boom Comini, Johnny Starr and Mr. Frost.

During his career, Farmer held a several titles. With Bobby Duncum he held the NWA Western States Tag Team title in 1971 and he also held the California State Heavyweight Championship on three occasions during the early 1980s. Other titles include:

- American Wrestling Association
  - Awa Midwest Tag Team Championship ( 1 time ) with Reggie Parks
- Western States Alliance
  - WSA Heavyweight Championship ( 1 time )
  - WSA Tag Team Championship ( 1 time ) - with Tor Kamata

== Acting career ==
In 1985, he played an international wrestler in Grunt! the Wrestling Movie which was directed by Alan Holzman. Farmer had a role as Fuzzy in the Frank Harris directed Low Blow which starred Leo Fong as private eye, Joe Wong. He would appear in another film involving Fong's Joe Wong character, this time in Blood Street.

== Personal life ==
Farmer's son Rex is a wrestler who wrestles under the name of Shane Kody. He also had another son named Todd who was not included in his fathers generation of wrestlers who later had two sons. His grandson Rex, Jnr. is also a wrestler known as Riot.

== Death ==
Farmer died in California from cancer at age 76 on February 29, 2012.

== Filmography ==
Film
Title	Role	Director	Year	Notes #
Grunt! The Wrestling Movie!	Battle Royale Wrestler	Allan Holzman	1985	
Low Blow	Fuzzy	Frank Harris	1986	
Blood Street	Allan	George Chung; Leo Fong	1988	
