= Del Casher =

American guitarist and inventor (1937–2026)

- Casher with his original prototype wah and custom guitar with a hollow body, low-impedance pickups, and built-in passive EQ.
- Born: Delton Edward Kacher; December 28, 1937; Hammond, Indiana, U.S.
- Died: October 1, 2026 (aged 88)
- Education: University of Pittsburgh
- Occupations: Guitarist; inventor

Delton Edward Kacher (December 28, 1937 – October 1, 2026), known professionally as Del Casher, was an American guitarist and inventor. He invented the wah-wah pedal, the Ecco-Fonic, and the Fender Electronic Echo Chamber. He was the first to introduce the Roland Guitar Synthesizer for the Roland Corporation.

== Background ==
Delton Edward Kacher was born in Hammond, Indiana, on December 28, 1937. He was an alumnus of the University of Pittsburgh where he majored in communications. After college, he moved to Hollywood and was invited to perform as the guitar and banjo soloist on the Lawrence Welk television show. At that time, he also toured with the Three Suns, RCA recording artists who were well known for their hit song "Twilight Time".

While on tour for their album The Three Suns in Japan he introduced his new invention, the Ecco-Fonic, a tape echo device that was portable and could create echo effects that were previously possible only in the studio using large, expensive tape machines. He became friends with Ikutaro Kakehashi, who was the founder of the Roland Music Corporation of Japan. Kakehashi, as chairman of Roland, invited him to Japan to perform and introduce the first Roland guitar synthesizer. He signed with Japan Victor and Japan's Union Records as a featured artist on more than 16 hit albums.

He was a popular studio guitarist in Hollywood. Paramount Pictures hired him to appear with Elvis Presley in his movie Roustabout. Presley invited him for future engagements. Casher received a contract to appear on Gene Autry's Melody Ranch TV show. During this part of his career, he played with a diverse assortment of musicians, including Eddy Arnold, Connie Francis, Bobby Vinton, Sonny and Cher, and the Mothers of Invention.

Casher died from cancer on October 1, 2026, at the age of 88.

== Inventing the Wah-Wah pedal ==
In the mid-1960s Thomas Organ Company acquired the Vox amplifier name from Jennings Musical Instruments of the UK. Casher was a guitarist and consultant for Vox and often performed with the Vox Amplifonic Big Band in California. The solid state engineering staff at Thomas Organ (headed by Stan Cutler) assigned Brad Plunkett to convert the UK Vox amplifier into the US Vox solid state amplifier. To save costs, Vox had the Dick Denney Mid-Range Boost Switch redesigned into a variable tone control. As Casher worked on the project, he discovered that when he moved the tone control from left to right on the amplifier, it created a "wah" sound similar to a harmonica player cupping his hands around the microphone and harmonica. This was the new sound that he had been looking for. It enabled him to express a better bluesy feeling on the electric guitar.

Casher asked the engineering team to have a breadboard with that circuit installed into a Vox organ volume pedal. This enabled him to play his guitar while moving the pedal. However, with the rich harmonics of the guitar, the sound was too harsh in the "bright" position and too muddy in the "mellow" position. With a little experimenting, Casher and the Vox engineering staff were able to create a sound similar to a trumpet "wah" mute.

Vox saw no use for a "wah" sound for the guitar, believing it would be better for the electric trumpet. In 1967, after some negotiating, Vox agreed to have Del compose and release a record using the new Wah-wah pedal.

== Film and television performances with the pedal ==
Universal Pictures hired Casher to be the featured artist on three movies using his prototype Wah-wah pedal: The Ghost and Mr. Chicken, The Shakiest Gun in the West, and The Traveling Saleslady. MGM hired him for the Tony Curtis film Don't Make Waves. In the meantime, Vox was unsuccessful in its efforts to promote the pedal for use on the electric trumpet.

His playing also appears on the theme for NBC Nightly News and is the longest running TV news theme.

== Later activities ==
In 1972, he was hired as Music Director for the children's television show The New Zoo Revue. He produced over 200 shows as well as over 200 children's music, educational, and dance albums for Activity Records of New York. His music is heard in public schools that use Hap Palmer's educational materials.

Casher composed a classical work in three movements: Americana Suite for Orchestra. He was also the producer of the Japanese anime television series, in English, Love Hina, Tenchi Muyo!, and Sakura Wars.

== Film work ==
(Selective)
Title	Role	Director	Year	Notes #
Our Town	Composer	George Schaefer	1977	TV movie
24 Hours to Midnight	Composer	Leo Fong; George Chung	1985	
Terror Night	Re-recording mixer Performer: "Biker's Beat"; Writer: "Biker's Beat"	Nick Marino; André De Toth	1987	
Nightmare Sisters	Composer	David DeCoteau	1988	
Deadly Embrace	Composer	George Schaefer	1989	
Action U.S.A.	Composer	John Stewart	1989	
Murder Weapon	Composer	David DeCoteau	1989	
Dadda Connection	Composer	Toby Russell	1990	
Tropical Heat	Composer	Jag Mundhra	1993	
Showdown	Composer: additional music	Leo Fong	1993	
White Cargo	Composer	Daniel Reardon	1996	

== Other sources ==
- "An Oral History of the Wah-Wah Pedal" in Wax Poetics magazine. Vol. 42, July/August 2010
