= Warriors of the Apocalypse =

Warriors of the Apocalypse may refer to:

- Warriors of the Apocalypse (1985 film), a science fiction action film directed by Bobby A. Suarez
- Warriors of the Apocalypse (2009 film), a science fiction action film directed by Len Kabasinski
