= The Last Gun =

1964 film

- Directed by: Sergio Bergonzelli
- Screenplay by: Ambrogio Molteni; James Wilde Jr.
- Story by: Dick Fulner
- Produced by: Luigi Gianni
- Starring: Cameron Mitchell; Carl Möhner; Ketty Carver; Celina Cely
- Cinematography: Amerigo Gengarelli; Romolo Garroni
- Edited by: Dolores Tamburini
- Music by: Marcello Gigante
- Production company: Rasfilm
- Distributed by: Dipa
- Release date: 1964
- Running time: 88 minutes
- Country: Italy

The Last Gun (Italian: Jim il primo, lit. 'Jim the First') is a 1964 Italian Western film directed by Sergio Bergonzelli. The story unfolds in 1866 in Arizona, where a town faces a threat from bandits. This prompts a former gunfighter to once again arm himself for a final showdown.

== Synopsis ==
Legendary outlaw and gunfighter Jim Hart retires from his evil ways and settles as the shopkeeper in the quiet town of Sanderson. This peaceful life is violently interrupted when the evil Jess Lindahl and his gang begin terrorizing the townspeople. Forced to pick up his gun and don a mask, Jim finds himself drawn yet again into violence, but this time on the side of good.

== Release ==
"The Last Gun" was first released in 1964. It was distributed in Italy by Dipa as "Jim il Primo," translated as "Jim the First." It was distributed in England by British Lion as Killer's Canyon.

== Reception ==
In a retrospective review, Christopher Forsley of PopMatters described "the entire film [...] is unfocused". Forsley delved into the portrayal of female characters, noting that "every female character [...] no matter her age, faces a sustained threat of sexual assault." Despite the disturbing nature of this themes, Forsley remarked that "it's through this unrelenting threat that Bergonzelli's uniquely perverted voice is heard and the film is almost redeemed for its many failures."

== See also ==
- Cameron Mitchell filmography
- List of Italian films of 1964
