= Frank Harris (director) =

American film director (1943–2020)

- Born: July 18, 1943
- Died: April 27, 2020 (aged 76); Santa Barbara, California, U.S.
- Occupations: Director, producer, cinematographer
- Spouse: Diane Stevenett (m. 1980)

Frank Harris (July 18, 1943 – April 27, 2020) was an American film director, producer, and cinematographer who has been working in films since the late 1970s. His work as a director includes Killpoint in 1984, Low Blow and The Patriot in 1986, If We Knew Then in 1987 and Lockdown in 1990. He originally worked as a television reporter.

== Background ==
His wife Canadian born Diane Stevenett (married 1980), has also appeared in a number of his films.

Before entering the film industry, Harris worked as a reporter for a California television station.

== Career ==
He began his career around 1976 or 1978 as a cinematographer with Enforcer from Death Row aka Ninja Assassins, a film that featured Leo Fong, Darnell Garcia, John Hammond, Cameron Mitchell, Ann Farber and Booker T. Anderson. He then applied his cinematography skills to the film Goldrunner, a film about a kidnapped child, which starred Richard Losee and Kristin Kelly. Harris also had an acting role in the film as the mechanic. He took on multiple tasks in the 1984 film, Killpoint. He was the film's director, producer, screenwriter and cinematographer.

=== Director ===
Killpoint, a 1984 film that starred Leo Fong, Hope Holiday, Cameron Mitchell, Stack Pierce and Richard Rountree, Diane Stevenett was his directorial debut. It also featured James Lew and Bill Wallace. In 1986 he directed Low Blow, another Leo Fong Film that featured Billy Blanks and Akosua Busia, early 1960s heartthrob Troy Donahue and Stack Pierce. This film gave Blanks his first credited film role. Also in 1986 he directed The Patriot, a film about a disgraced navy seal that goes after terrorists that steal nuclear missiles. It starred Gregg Henry, Simone Griffeth, Jeff Conaway, Leslie Nielsen and Stack Pierce. 1990 he directed Aftershock, a Sci-Fi film set in Set in a post-apocalyptic 21st Century. It starred Elizabeth Kaitan, Chuck Jeffreys, James Lew, Richard Lynch, Christopher Mitchum, John Saxon and Michael Standing

=== Cinematographer ===
As a cinematographer, Harris's early work was with Leo Fong in Enforcer from Death Row which starred Cameron Mitchell, Leo Fong, Booker T. Anderson, and Darnell Garcia. In the 1980s, he worked on the Joel Silberg directed Catch the Heat, an action film about a female agent / martial expert operating in Argentina. It was released in 1987. Harris was back working with Leo Fong in Showdown. The 1993 film which also starred Richard Lynch and Werner Hoetzinger was about a town of Mafia retirees that have their sanctuary invaded by a motorcycle gang. Harris worked on the 2009 television series Kamen Rider: Dragon Knight. Already a seasoned veteran, he was in charge of the camera crew.

== Filmography ==
=== Feature films ===
Director
Title	Year	Notes #
Killpoint	1984	
Low Blow	1986	
The Patriot	1986	
If We Knew Then	1987	
Girl Talk	1989	
Aftershock	1990	
Lockdown	1990	

Cinematographer
Title	Director	Year	Notes #
Ninja Assassins	Marshall M. Borden; Efren C. Piñon	1976	
Goldrunner	Richard Losee	1980	
Killpoint	Frank Harris	1984	
24 Hours to Midnight	Leo Fong	1985	
Low Blow	Frank Harris	1986	
The Patriot	Frank Harris	1986	
Hawkeye	George Chung	1986	
Lockdown	Frank Harris	1990	
Black Belt Angels	Chi Kim	1994	
Skyscraper	Raymond Martino	1996	
Brazilian Brawl	Leo Fong	2003	
Transformed	Efren C. Piñon	2005	
Let's All Kill Harold	Jim Skidmore	2015	

Actor
Title	Role	Director	Year	Notes #
Goldrunner	Mechanic	Richard Losee	1980	
Low Blow	Uncredited role	Frank Harris	1986	

=== Television ===
Television shows
Title	Episode #	Role	Director	Year	Notes #
Critter Gitters	The Flying Professor	first assistant camera	Bryan Curb	1998	
Critter Gitters	Kinetics Catastrophe I & II	first assistant director	Bryan Curb	1999	
Critter Gitters	Cow Pie Bingo	first assistant director	Eric D. Howell	1999	
Kamen Rider: Dragon Knight	Out of the Void	Cinematographer	Mark Allen	2009	
Kamen Rider: Dragon Knight	Back in Black	Cinematographer	Mark Allen	2009	
Kamen Rider: Dragon Knight	A Hero's Fall	Cinematographer	Mark Allen	2009	
Kamen Rider: Dragon Knight	Dark Deception	Cinematographer	Steve Wang	2009	
Kamen Rider: Dragon Knight	The Enemy Within	Cinematographer	Steve Wang	2009	
Kamen Rider: Dragon Knight	A Dragon's Tale	Cinematographer	Steve Wang	2009	

TV documentary
Title	Role	Director	Year	Notes #
Heart of the Soul with Gary Zukav	Camera	Bill Einreinhofer	2002	
Barbaro	camera operator	Frank Deford	2008	
