= Texas Lightning =

Texas Lightning may refer to:

- Texas Lightning (band), a German country music quintet
- Texas Lightning (film), a 1981 film directed by Gary Graver
- Texas Lightning (soccer), a U.S. soccer club, later the Dallas Lightning
- "Texas Lightning" (Magnum, P.I.), a 1982 television episode
