= Blood Street =

- Film poster
- Directed by: Leo Fong; George Chung
- Written by: Leo Fong
- Produced by: Sunny Lim
- Starring: Leo Fong; Richard Norton; Stan Wertlieb; Stack Pierce; Chuck Jeffreys; Kim Paige; Patty Georgeson; Joe Lynum; Woody Farmer
- Narrated by: Leo Fong
- Cinematography: Frank Harris
- Edited by: Peter Jones
- Music by: W.C. Jeffreys; Paul Schroeder
- Production company: Star Partners II Ltd.
- Release date: 1988
- Running time: 80 minutes
- Country: United States
- Language: English

Blood Street is a 1988 action film co-directed by Leo Fong and George Chung. It stars Fong in a reprised role as private detective Joe Wong, who has been hired to find a woman's husband who has gone missing. Richard Norton, Stan Wertlieb, Stack Pierce, Chuck Jeffreys and Kymberly Paige also appear in the film.

== Story ==
Joe Wong was a character that previously appeared in a Leo Fong film, Low Blow. He was a California PI who ran his business out of his shabby unkempt office. Wong returns in this film as one of the best in the business, operating from his base in San Francisco. One day a woman walks into Wong's office and asks for his help. She needs him to find her missing husband Aldo. This takes Wong on a journey though the criminal world. Along the way he encounters a father and son team of Solomon and Bones which is played by Stack Pierce and Chuck Jeffreys. Wong ends up getting involved in a gang war between Malcolm Boyd (played by Richard Norton) and Aldo (played by Stan Wertlieb), the man he was supposed to be looking for.

== Background ==
Due to the recurring character Joe Wong, the film is a sequel of sorts to Low Blow where in this film, Fong plays a Raymond Chandler type martial arts expert. The alternative title Eyes of the Dragon 2 Bloodstreet, could give the impression that it is a possible sequel to another Fong Directed title Eyes of the Dragon, which also featured Richard Norton, Chuck Jeffreys.

It was directed by both Leo Fong and George Chung, and the cinematographer was Frank Harris.

The narration for the film was provided by Leo Fong.

=== Roles and actor info ===
Stack Pierce who plays Solomon here, acted in Low Blow and depending on which source, he played either Corky or Duke.
