= 24 Hours to Midnight =

1985 film

- VHS cover
- Directed by: Leo Fong; George Chung
- Written by: Leo Fong
- Produced by: Philip Cable; Sunny Lim (exec prod.)
- Starring: Juan Chapa; Stephen Moore; Myra; Stack Pierce; Bernie Pock; De'Ann Power; Steve Quimby; Cynthia Rothrock
- Cinematography: Frank Harris
- Edited by: Christopher Roth
- Music by: Del Casher
- Production company: Sunny Film Corp.
- Distributed by: Action International Pictures; Condor Video
- Release date: 1985
- Running time: 91 minutes
- Country: United States
- Language: English

24 Hours to Midnight is a 1985 action film directed by Leo Fong and starring Juan Chapa, Stephen Moore, Stack Pierce, Bernie Pock, De'Ann Power and Cynthia Rothrock. It is about a woman who takes revenge on the people that killed her husband.

== Background ==
Apparently Cynthia Rothrock pulled out of the film and the footage with her was shelved for some years. Later scenes with Deanne Powers dressed in a ninja suit were added. The book, The Encyclopedia of Martial Arts Movies by Bill Palmer, Karen Palmer, and Ric Meyers credit George Chung as the director, while other sources credit Leo Fong as the film's director. The production company was Sunny Film Corp.

=== Releases ===
Due to the success of the film in video stores, the video rights were acquired by Buena Vista Home Entertainment and ten years later it was re-released. Around 2004, it was re-released through a new company called Draculina Cine. The film's 4th re-release on video was by distributor, Lions Gate.

== Story ==
Devon Grady's husband is killed by gang henchmen. Grady (played by Cynthia Rothrock) goes on a mission of revenge on his killers using her ninja skills. She fights her way to get to the evil villain "White Powder Chan (played by Stack Pierce). While taking her revenge she is being stalked by two police officers who are trying to get to the bottom of who is making the mayhem. The cops, Lee Ann Jackson and Lester McQueen were played by Myra, and Bernie Pock.

== Cast ==
- Juan Chapa as Harry Grady
- Leo T. Fong as "Mr. Big"
- Stephen Moore
- Myra as LeAnn Jackson
- Stack Pierce as "White Powder" Chan
- Bernie Pock as Lester McQueen
- De'Ann Power as Chan's Girlfriend / Woman In Ninja Suit (credited as Deanne Power)
- Steve Quimby as Roland Stokes
- Cynthia Rothrock as Devon Grady
- Rick Scott as West
- Brinke Stevens as Devon Grady (voice)
- Joseph Torres Jr. as Hernandez
- Freddy Waff as Gang Member
