= Star Raiders: The Adventures of Saber Raine =

- Directed by: Mark Steven Grove
- Written by: Mark Steven Grove
- Produced by: Adam Lipsius; Mark Steven Grove
- Starring: Casper Van Dien; Cynthia Rothrock; James Lew; Brit Laree; Sara N. Salazar; Mark Steven Grove
- Cinematography: Michael T. Sanchez
- Edited by: Will Beckingham; Mark Steven Grove
- Music by: Matthew Adam White
- Release date: 8 May 2017 (United Kingdom)
- Running time: 83 minutes
- Country: United States
- Language: English

Star Raiders: The Adventures of Saber Raine is a 2017 American science fiction film about a group of mercenaries who embark on a mission to rescue a prince and princess from an evil tyrant on a far away planet. It was directed by Mark Steven Grove, and stars Casper Van Dien, Cynthia Rothrock, James Lew, Brit Laree, Sara N. Salazar and Sarah Sansoni.

== Plot ==
A prince and princess are abducted from their planet. Saber Raine, a soldier of fortune is hired to bring them back. Along with three others, he embarks on the mission. They end up on a planet in the depths of space which is run by an evil overlord called Sinjin. Having been freed from centuries of containment in a cryogenic prison, Sinjin is now teaming up with beings called the Quintari who have caused havoc throughout the galaxy. Sinjin has a plan of revenge against his betrayers' descendants and he has a powerful weapon.

== Cast ==
- Casper Van Dien as Saber Raine
- Cynthia Rothrock as Kandra Syn
- James Lew as Sinjin
- Brit Laree as Fade
- Sara N. Salazar as Caliope
- Mark Steven Grove as Kor'Rok
- Kevin Sean Ryan as Xorian
- Sarah Sansoni as Andromeda
- Cordy McGowan as Cersi
- Adam Lipsius as Admiral Steele
- Tyler Weaver Jr. as Tyr
- Andy Hankins as Commander Voss
- Holly Westwood as Crotalus
- Nico Feula as Dane
- Michael Grell as Jax Grymm
- Scott Sheely as Mutate

== Production ==
The film was produced by Uptown 6 Productions, Fusion Factory Films, and Don't Pose Productions. The film was co-produced by Adam Lipsius and Mark Steven Grove as well as directed by Grove.
