= Efren C. Piñon =

- Other name: Efren C. Pinon
- Occupation: director
- Years active: 1971–present

Efren C. Piñon is a film director and writer from the Philippines. The main body of his career began in the early 1970s and lasted until the late 1990s. He has worked with actors such as Fred Williamson, Tony Ferrer, Leo Fong and Vic Diaz. His directorial work includes Gangsters daw kami! in 1971, Ninja Assassins in 1976 Blind Rage in 1977, Shoot the Killer in 1981 and Bandido in 1997. A significant amount of his films are of the action-exploitation type.

== Career ==
=== 1970s–1980s ===
He directed the 1976 film, The Interceptors which featured Tony Ferrer, Ramon Zamora, George Estregan, Edna Diaz, Paquito Diaz, Charlie Davao, Vic Diaz, and Max Alvarado. It was a 1976 Metro Manila Film Festival entry. He directed two films that featured Leo Fong. They were Enforcer from Death Row in 1976 and Blind Rage in 1977. Blind Rage which also featured Fred Williamson, Tony Ferrer and D'Urville Martin was a tale about five blind men trying to rob a bank. Akyat Bahay Gang was released in 1988. The film which starred Lito Lapid, Dick Israel, Chuck Perez, Jean Saburit, Zandro Zamora and Paquito Diaz was about a young carnival worker who makes a bad choice in his life.

=== 1990s–2000s ===
His 1996 film Seth Corteza was about a man who inherits turf in criminal underworld. He wants to make changes and faces the dangers that come about as a result. The film starred Ace Vergel in the lead role. He directed the 1997 film Bandido which starred Zoren Legaspi, Rando Almanzor and Dan Fernandez.

Piñon was back working with Leo Fong and Fred Williamson who he had worked with in the 1970s, in the 2005 film Transformed. The film had a prominent Christian theme. It was about pastor Debra (Played by Shirlee Knudson) who goes up against ruthless drug-dealer Cholo (Played by Ken Moreno). The film also has a redemption theme as during the course of the film, Cholo repents and finds God. The film also starred Xingu Del Rosario, Tadashi Yamashita, Stack Pierce and Jeremy Flynn.

He was interviewed for and appeared in the 2010 documentary Machete Maidens Unleashed!.

== Filmography ==
- Gangsters Daw Kami! (1971)
- The Interceptors (1976)
- Enforcer from Death Row (1976)
- Blind Rage (1977)
- Sabotage 2 (1979)
- Oscar Ramos: Hitman (1987)
- Akyat Bahay Gang (1988)
- Seth Corteza (1996)
- Bandido (1997)
- Pakners (1997)
- Transformed (direct-to-video, 2005)
