= The Patriot (1986 film) =

1986 film by Frank Harris

- Theatrical release poster
- Directed by: Frank Harris
- Written by: Andy Ruben; Katt Shea Ruben
- Produced by: Michael Bennett
- Starring: Gregg Henry; Simone Griffeth; Michael J. Pollard; Jeff Conaway; Stack Pierce; Leslie Nielsen
- Cinematography: Frank Harris
- Edited by: Richard E. Westover
- Music by: Jay Ferguson
- Distributed by: Crown International Pictures
- Release date: July 25, 1986
- Running time: 88 minutes
- Country: United States
- Language: English

The Patriot is a 1986 action film directed by Frank Harris and starring Gregg Henry, Simone Griffeth and Stack Pierce with Leslie Nielsen.

== Plot ==
A gang led by a man called Atkins (played by Stack Pierce) steal nuclear weapons from a storage facility in the desert. A burnt-out former Navy SEAL and Vietnam veteran who was dishonorably discharged is contacted by his former commanding officer to help retrieve the weapons.

== Cast ==
- Gregg Henry as Lieutenant Matt Ryder
- Simone Griffeth as Sean
- Michael J. Pollard as Howard
- Jeff Conaway as Commander Michael Mitchell
- Stack Pierce as Atkins
- Leslie Nielsen as Admiral Frazer
- Glenn Withrow as Pink
- Larry Mintz as Bite
- Diane Stevenett as Maggie
- Anthony Caldarella as Eight Ball
- Mike Gomez as Kenwood
- Larry Moss as Devon
- Smith Osbourne as Rosa
- Sally Brown as Girl in Bar

== Release ==
The Patriot was released in the United States on July 25, 1986, and in the Philippines on December 4, 1987.
