= Abena Busia =

Ghanaian diplomat and writer (born 1953)

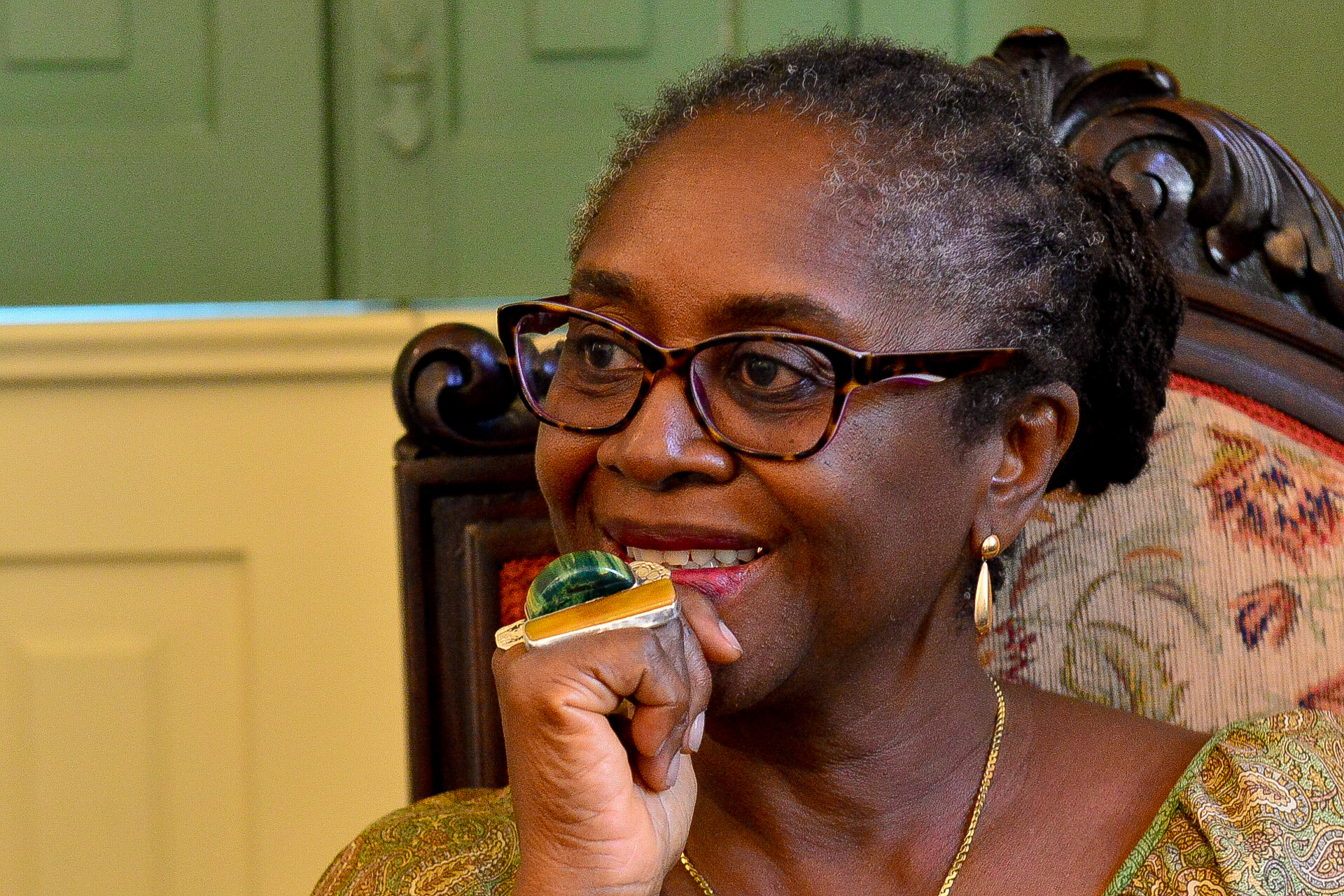
- Born: Abena Pokua Adompim Busia; 1953 (age 72–73); Accra, Ghana
- Education: St Anne's College, Oxford (B.A.); St. Antony's College, Oxford (D.Phil.)
- Occupations: Lecturer, writer, poet, feminist, diplomat
- Parents: Kofi Abrefa Busia (father); Naa Morkor Busia (mother)
- Relatives: Akosua Busia (sister)

Abena Pokua Adompim Busia (born 1953) is a Ghanaian writer, poet, feminist, lecturer and diplomat. She is a daughter of the former prime minister of Ghana, Kofi Abrefa Busia, and is the sister of actress Akosua Busia. Busia is an associate professor of Literature in English, and of women's and gender studies at Rutgers University. She was Ghana's ambassador to Brazil from 2017 to October 2025 with accreditation to the other 12 republics of South America.

== Early life and education ==
Busia was born in Accra, Ghana, into the Yenfri royal family in Wenchi in the Brong-Ahafo Region of Ghana, to Kofi Abrefa Busia, one-time Ghanaian Head of State, and his wife, Naa (Morkor) Busia. She spent her childhood in Ghana as well as in the Netherlands and Mexico before relocating to Oxford, where her family finally settled.

Busia earned a B.A. degree in English language and literature at St Anne's College, Oxford, in 1976, and a D.Phil. in social anthropology at St. Antony's College in 1984. She has been an external tutor at Ruskin College, the labour relations college affiliated to the University of Oxford, and a visiting lecturer in the Program of African and Afro-American Studies at Yale University. She has also won a number of post-doctoral fellowships including an Andrew Mellon Fellowship in the English department of Bryn Mawr College, and an Institute for American Cultures Fellowship at the Center for Afro-American Studies, UCLA.

== Career ==
Busia was co-director of the Women Writing Africa Project (which between 2002 and 2008 published the four-volume Women Writing Africa Series), as well as Professor of English at Rutgers University and the Chair of the Department of Women's and Gender Studies.

She has also taught at other institutions, among them Yale and the University of Ghana.

She has served as president of the Association for the Study of the Worldwide African Diaspora and of the African Literature Association, and currently chairs the board of AWDF-USA, sister organization of the African Women's Development Fund (AWDF), the first pan-African foundation to support the work of women's rights organisations in Africa.

=== Writing ===
Busia has published widely on black women's literature, colonial discourse, and post-colonial studies. Scholarly books she has co-edited include Theorizing Black Feminisms: The Visionary Pragmatism of Black Women (1993) and Beyond Survival: African Literature and the Search for New Life (1999). In addition, she is the author of two volumes of poetry: Testimonies of Exile (1990) and Traces of Life (2008). Her work is included in such anthologies as Daughters of Africa (edited by Margaret Busby, 1992).

== Ghanaian diplomat ==
In July 2017, President Nana Akuffo-Addo named Abena Busia as Ghana's ambassador to Brazil. She was among 22 other distinguished Ghanaians who were named to head various diplomatic Ghanaian missions in the world. She was ambassador in Brazil until October 2025.

== Selected bibliography ==
=== Poetry ===
- Testimonies of Exile — poetry, illustrated by Akosua Busia (Africa World Press, 1990; ISBN 978-0865431614)
- Traces of a Life: A Collection of Elegies and Praise Poems (Ayebia Clarke Publishing, 2008; ISBN 978-0955507977)

=== As editor ===
- Theorizing Black Feminisms: The Visionary Pragmatism of Black Women, co-editor with Stanlie M. James (Routledge, 1993; ISBN 978-0415073370)
- Beyond Survival: African Literature and the Search for New Life, co-editor with Kofi Anyidoho and Anne Adams (Africa World Press, 1999; ISBN 978-0865437098)
- Women Writing Africa: West Africa and Sahel (2005)

== Awards and recognition ==
In March 2011, marking the 100th anniversary of International Women's Day, the AWDF recognised Abena Busia as one of 50 inspirational African feminists, with a public celebration in her honour taking place in June at the National Theatre in Accra.

She is co-founder and Chair of the Busia Foundation International, a non-government organisation set up in honour of Ghana's former Prime Minister, Kofi Abrefa Busia, the 40th anniversary of whose death was marked by a public memorial lecture on 28 August 2018 at the Accra International Conference Centre.

== See also ==
- Kofi Abrefa Busia
- Akosua Busia
- List of Ghanaian writers
