= Stan Wertlieb =

American film producer (born 1953)

- Born: 8 September 1953 (age 72); Washington, D.C., United States
- Occupations: Film producer Principal & partner of the Grindstone Entertainment Group

Stan Wertlieb (born 8 September 1953) is a Miami-based film producer and the head of Grindstone Entertainment Group.

== Background ==
As a producer, Wertlieb's work is mainly in the action genre. Some of the films he has been involved in include First Kill, Gotti, Last Knights, The Frozen Ground and Escape Plan: The Extractors.

== Career ==
During the 90s, Wertlieb had a short career as an actor. He appeared in Hawkeye (1988) as Tony Caprisio and in Blood Street (1988) as MacDonald. He was also in the 1998 film, Welcome to Hollywood as operation redline producer.

In 2007, the CFO of Grindstone Entertainment was Barry Brooker. Wertlieb's role was to work closely with him in targeting programming for the organization. He was later Head of acquisitions and later, the principal.

Among his earliest work as a producer was the 2003 sci-fi film, Silent Warnings which he co-produced with Jeffrey Beach and Phillip Roth. Along with Barry Brooker, Wertlieb was the executive producer for Andrew Paquin's debut film, Open House. He also co-produced the 2017 film Aftermath which starred Arnold Schwarzenegger, Scoot McNairy and Maggie Grace.
