= Low Blow (film) =

- Directed by: Frank Harris
- Written by: Leo Fong
- Produced by: Leo Fong
- Starring: Leo Fong; Cameron Mitchell; Troy Donahue; Diane Stevenett; Akosua Busia; Patti Bowling; Stack Pierce
- Cinematography: Frank Harris
- Edited by: Frank Harris
- Music by: Steve Amundsen
- Distributed by: Crown International Pictures
- Release date: 1986
- Country: United States
- Language: English

Low Blow (released in the Philippines as The Last Fight to Win: The Bloody End) is a 1986 film edited, shot, and directed by Frank Harris and released through Crown International Pictures. It is about a private investigator that goes on the hunt for a girl who has been taken in by a religious cult. He recruits a team to help him in his quest to rescue the girl. It stars Leo Fong, Cameron Mitchell, Troy Donahue, Akosua Busia, and Stack Pierce.

== Plot ==
A young heiress is in the clutches of a weird religious sect which is based in a rural compound. The cult leader (played by Cameron Mitchell). At his side is a lady called Karma (played by Akosua Busia) who has a vocal prowess. She is also the lover of the leader. Joe Wong (played by Leo Fong) is a former policeman, who has been hired by her businessman father to bring her back to him safely. He teams up with a group to help him which includes a Vietnam vet and a pro-boxing champ.

== Cast ==
Cast
Name	Role
Leo Fong	Joe Wong
Cameron Mitchell	Yarakunda
Troy Donahue	John Templeton
Diane Stevenett	Diane
Akosua Busia	"Karma"
Patti Bowling	Karen Templeton
Stack Pierce	"Duke"
Woody Farmer	"Fuzzy"
Elaine Hightower	Cody
Ron Ackerman	Police Chief

== Production ==
The film was directed by Frank Harris. Leo Fong produced the film and Hope Holiday was the associate producer. Leo Fong also wrote the story. The film also features Billy Blanks in his first film role.

== Release ==
Low Blow was released in the United States in 1986. In the Philippines, the film was released as The Last Fight to Win: The Bloody End by Movierama Films on October 13, 1988, connecting it to the unrelated film Fight to Win; the film poster miscredits Jean-Claude Van Damme as its writer and director.

It was released on Vestron in both Beta and VHS formats in 1986.

== Critical reception ==
Fong's performance in the cult film was called a tour de force head-scratcher by Cnet.com.

== Sequels ==
Fong reprised his role as Joe Wong in Blood Street (1988) and Hard Way Heroes (2010).
