= The Last Reunion =

- Directed by: Jay Wertz
- Written by: Kim Ramos; Galen Thompson
- Starring: Leo Fong; Cameron Mitchell; Hal Bokar; Philip Baker Hall; Stack Pierce; Vic Silayan.
- Cinematography: Frank E. Johnson
- Music by: William Loose; Johnny Mandel
- Release date: 1982
- Running time: 98 minutes
- Language: English

The Last Reunion is a 1982 action drama film directed by Jay Wertz. It stars Leo Fong, Cameron Mitchell, Hal Bokar, Philip Baker Hall, Stack Pierce, and Vic Silayan. The film is also known as Revenge of the Bushido Blade. It was written and produced at a time when there was a succession of popular Hollywood action films incorporating martial arts-themed plots and storylines.

== Plot ==
During Japan's occupation of The Philippines in World War II, Japanese boy Kimon Matsuda witnesses the murder of his parents by American soldiers from the 75th Rangers infantry.

His father, a Japanese general, is shot dead, while his mother is raped by Corporal Tom Steadman and other Rangers before she is killed.

When questioned by Captain Kimbro of the Rangers about the woman's death, Corporal Steadman shoots Kimbro and blames the death on "the Jap woman". To avoid any punishment, Rangers Mike Sills and Dante Salazar back up Steadman's story about the killing.

The Rangers then abandon the encampment as Kimon cries, mourning the death of his parents.

After the war, Kimon moves to America, where he is raised by his fraternal grandparents. Vowing revenge for the death of his parents and especially the rape and murder of his mother, the boy begins studying Asian martial arts.

As an adult, Kimon opens an import-export business in San Francisco and collects newspaper reports and other information about the 75th Rangers soldiers who had served in World War Two. He learns of a Rangers reunion due to take place in the Philippines. Although the Rangers have hosted many gatherings and reunions in the US over the years, Kimon sees a special opportunity in the Philippines to exact revenge on both the Americans and also the Filipinos responsible for the death of his parents.

Kimon flies into Manila the day after the 75th Rangers arrive. He purchases his father's old Samurai sword from a specialist antique dealer who recognises his family name, Matsuda. When he quizzes Kimon about his desire to own the obscure old sword, Kimon confesses his motives.

The antique dealer warns Kimon of the danger of revenge killings and vengeance, but Kimon dismisses the caution and vows to track down and execute his foes.

After preparing his deceased father's sword, Kimon lies-in-wait in a dark alley for Victor Quantez, a Filipino who assisted the Rangers as a runner and messenger boy during the war. Since the war, Quantez has become a successful breeder of prize-fighting cocks. Kimon slashes Quantez to death with the Samurai sword before fleeing into the night.

Meanwhile across town, the Rangers attend a dance and become embroiled in a bar-room brawl when Steadman attempts to roughly coerce a Filipino girl who has caught his eye on the dancefloor.

Due to the damage and destruction caused during the fight, the Rangers are called before their Filipino war comrade, Raoul Amante, now a senior-ranking police inspector in Manila, who is also participating in the reunion.

Amante briefs Sam Hacker of the 75th Rangers about Quantez's death earlier in the night, pointing out that Quantez had links to the Rangers' wartime activities in the Philippines.

After killing Quantez, Kimon plots to kill Dante Salazar, another Filipino comrade of the 75th Rangers. Since the war, Salazar has established himself as a successful actor in action films and martial arts movies in the Philippines. Kimon inserts himself into a fight scene that Salazar is filming and kills Salazar, taking him by surprise and breaking his neck during the fight sequence, which was supposed to be carefully staged and choreographed.

Salazar's death at the hands of Kimon is caught on film during the making of the movie and the footage is handed to Raoul Amante at the police department.

Also attending the 75th Rangers reunion is Mike Sills, a witness to the rape and murder of Kimon's mother that was instigated by Steadman. Haunted by memories of the war and his time in the 75th Rangers, Sills has become a depressed heavy drinker.

Rita, a pretty local Filipino girl, takes pity on Sills and befriends him. Despite her efforts to seduce Sills, he explains to her that alcohol has become his only companion, escape and solace.

As she leaves his hotel room after being turned down by him, Sills drinks whiskey alone and laments his unhappy and unfulfilled life. He answers a knock at the door and is confronted by Kimon. Knowing that he faces death, Sills asks for a final drink of whiskey before succumbing to Kimon's blade.

Amante urgently phones Hacker late in the evening to convene a meeting and warn him of a vendetta being played out against the Rangers. He explains to Hacker that he engaged lip readers at the Hearing Institute to conduct an examination of the film in which Salazar is killed. The lip readers reveal that the name 'Matsuda' is uttered by Kimon as he breaks Salazar's neck. Amante also tells Hacker that the Japanese word 'Bushido!' is declared by Kimon as he flees the movie set.

Armed with this information, Amante and the police department deduce that Kimon Matsuda is the person responsible for the spate of deaths during the Rangers' reunion. Intelligence reveals that Kimon Matsuda is indeed in the Philippines, having flown into Manila Airport from the US a day after the Rangers.

As the meeting between Amante and Hacker takes place, Steadman and Frank Washington of the 75th Rangers return to the Rangers' hotel after a night of heavy drinking. Steadman goes into a melt-down when he discovers that Sills' severed head has been placed inside his hotel room as a warning of things to come.

As fear rises among the Rangers and they learn of the presence of a killer on their trail, they are issued with armed police escorts.

Hacker confesses his long-held skepticism and doubt about Steadman's original story surrounding the death of Kimon's mother, implying that he has always had strong reservations about Steadman's character.

Scared that he may have become a marked man, Steadman advises the other Rangers that they should all stay close together from now on. He suggests that it will be safer if they have dinner together, but Hacker refuses the offer and again expresses his dislike of the unpopular Steadman.

As Steadman has dinner in his hotel room, a voice is heard at the door claiming to be a police officer sent to replace Steadman's armed guard. As the guard opens the door he is disarmed by Kimon, who abducts Steadman and takes him prisoner inside a vault in an industrial park and construction site that contains demolition explosives. The plant is situated on the same plot of land as the Japanese encampment where Kimon's parents were killed during the war.

Kimon alerts the police and the 75th Rangers that he is holding Steadman hostage. The Rangers rush to the construction site, where Hacker tries to negotiate Steadman's release. Hacker pleads with Kimon as Steadman is heard in the background, begging to be rescued.

Hacker tells Kimon that the legal system can prevail and bring Steadman to justice, but Kimon rejects the offer.

As Hacker gives up and turns to walk away from the office where Kimon and Steadman are holed-up, a massive explosion is heard inside the vault, instantly killing both Kimon and Steadman.

Hacker, Washington and Amante watch the flames from the blast as they lament the war and its lasting impact on those affected by it.

== Background ==
It was released on VHS videotape as Ninja Nightmare by the Los Angeles-based company, Prism Entertainment Corp. Some video release titles are confusing.

According to Code Red, after years of only an inferior print as the master for the video release, the original negative was obtained and a high quality 16x9 master was created. The scenes that were shot at night were more viewable and an extra scene not seen on the video release was added. An audio commentary that Leo Fong had recorded was added. It was later released on DVD in 2009 as The Last Reunion. The DVD release was by Rare Flix.

== Cast ==
- Boy Acosta ... Bar Patron
- Butz Aquino ... Japanese General
- Jose Mari Avellana ... Liang
- Minnie Badong ... Belen
- Paul Bailey ... Lt. Hacker
- Ricky Bernardo ... Pvt. Quantez
- Bernadette Bleza ... Hostess
- Hal Bokar ... Older Steadman
- Michael Borja ...Cock Fight Patron
- Charlie Davao ... Dante Salazar
- Amante de Guzman ... Bar Patron
- Sage Downing ... Secretary
- Pol Enriquez ... Taxi Driver
- Leo Fong ... Kimon Matsuda
- Jim Gaines ... Cpl. Washington
- Nonette J. Garcia ... Script Girl
- Bernardo Guindayao ... Sgt. Orate
- Philip Baker Hall ... Mike Sills
- Eduardo Herrera ... Cock Fight Patron
- Hope Holiday ... Sally the Singer
- Pros Justiano ... Ishima
- Paul LeClair ... Disco Bartender
- Virgie Lee ... Hostess
- Loida Miano ... Desk Clerk
- Cameron Mitchell ... Sam Hacker
- Paul Nunez ... PC Officer
- Stack Pierce ...Frank Washington
- Paterno Punio ... Cruz
- Kim Ramos ... Quantez
- Mariwin Roberts ... Shayna
- Roma Roces ... Miekko Matsuda
- Chanda Romero ... Rita
- Henry Salcedo ... Director
- Larry Silayan ... Lt. Amante
- Vic Silayan ... Raoul Amante
- Rob Stuart ... Cpl. Steadman
- Galen Thompson ... Ranger Captain
- Ruben Tizon Jr. ... Young Kimon
- Sammy Valencia ... Big Gem Bartender
- Belen Vasquez ... Make-Up Girl
- Allan Wing ... Cpl. Sills
