= Trapped Alive =

- Video artwork
- Directed by: Leszek Burzynski
- Screenplay by: Leszek Burzynski; Julian Weaver
- Produced by: Christopher Webster
- Starring: Cameron Mitchell; Sullivan Hester; Laura Kallison; Mark Witsken; Michael Nash; Alex Kubik; Elizabeth Kent; Jay Leggett
- Cinematography: Nancy Schreiber
- Edited by: Matthew Mallinson
- Music by: Michael Mark
- Production company: Filmworld International
- Distributed by: WorldVision Entertainment
- Release dates: 1988 (premiere); December 22, 1993
- Running time: 92 minutes
- Country: United States
- Language: English

Trapped Alive (originally titled Forever Mine; also known as Trapped) is a 1988 American slasher film directed by Leszek Burzynski, and starring Cameron Mitchell, Sullivan Hester, Laura Kallison, Mark Witsken, Michael Nash, Jay Leggett, and Elizabeth Kent. It follows two women who are abducted by a group of escaped convicts after leaving a Christmas party, and become trapped in a mine shaft where they are preyed upon by a cannibalistic murderer.

== Plot ==
Robin Adams departs her family's Christmas Eve party with her friend, Monica Perry, to attend a party being held by mutual friends. Meanwhile, criminals Mongo and Louis "Face" Napoleon escape from a nearby penitentiary with fellow inmate Randy Carter as a hostage. The men stop Robin and Monica along a snowy country road and abduct them, appointing Randy as the driver of the car. Randy drives into a wooded area where he inadvertently crashes the car into an abandoned mineshaft. Mongo is fatally injured, but the others survive, despite the car exploding and causing the shaft entrance to collapse.

Meanwhile, Sheriff Billy Williams arrives nearby in search of Face and Mongo, but finds no trace of them. He visits a house near the mineshaft where he is invited inside by its owner, Rachel. Rachel is flirtatious with Billy, and seduces him while her husband sleeps. In the shaft, Randy finds that Mongo's body has been apparently cannibalized. Robin manages to become separated from Face and Monica, and locates an emergency phone in a tunnel that connects to Rachel's house. Billy answers the call, and hears a panicked Robin screaming for help.

Billy subsequently locates the sinkhole entrance into the mine on Rachel's property, and rappels down using a rope tied to the bumper of his police car, but the rope is cut, causing him to also be trapped below. Billy stumbles upon Randy standing over Mongo's body, and the two join the others. Billy handcuffs Randy and Face separately to keep them contained. Robin, who has taken a liking to Randy, begins to question him about his criminal past and how he became involved in accompanying Mongo and Face.

Face is impaled with a hooked spike by a mutated man—revealed to be Rachel's father—who pulls him to an upper chamber of the mine and begins cannibalizing him as the others look on in horror. The group manage to lift an iron gate blocking a tunnel, but the gate collapses before Monica can pass through it, crushing Billy's leg in the process. Rachel's father approaches and grabs Monica from behind. Randy attempts to shoot at him, but inadvertently misses, shooting Monica in the head and killing her.

Meanwhile, Robin's lawyer father, John, is retiring for the night after his Christmas party. He attempts to phone Robin at her friend's home, but is told that she and Monica never arrived. A worried John attempts to report Robin missing, but is dismissed by police. Back in the mine, the remaining survivors find a pool of water, which Rachel's father emerges from and pulls Randy into. Robin manages to impale the assailant through the throat with a metal pole, and pulls Randy from the water to safety.

Moments later, a crazed Rachel enters the cave and begins chastising Robin, Randy, and Billy for killing her father. She reveals that her father was one of 18 men who were left to die in the mine after a cave-in years prior. Secretly never giving up hope that her father was still alive, Rachel married the caretaker of the property, hoping to locate her missing father. After venturing into the mine and exploring it, Rachel eventually found her father, who had survived by cannibalizing his fellow miners. Rachel attempts to detonate the mine with dynamite and kill herself and everyone inside. Randy and Robin narrowly escape through a passageway, while Billy and Rachel are killed in the explosion.

Arriving at the surface, Randy and Robin are met by police, as well as John. Robin explains to her father that Randy saved her life, and begs for him to help him, to which he agrees.

== Cast ==
- Jay Leggett as Prison Guard
- Cameron Mitchell as John Adams
- Sullivan Hester as Robin Adams
- Laura Kallison as Monica Perry (as Laura Kalison)
- Mark Witsken as Randy Carter
- Michael Nash as Mongo
- Alex Kubik as Louis "Face" Napoleon
- Elizabeth Kent as Rachel
- Randy Powell as Sheriff Billy Williams
- Paul Dean as the Monster/Rachel's Father

== Production ==
The film was shot at Windsor Lake Studios in Eagle River, Wisconsin in February 1988.

== Release ==
The film was released directly to video on December 22, 1993. Arrow Films released Trapped Alive on Blu-ray in 2019.
