= Killpoint =

1984 film by Frank Harris

- Theatrical poster to Killpoint
- Directed by: Frank Harris
- Written by: Frank Harris
- Produced by: Frank Harris
- Starring: Leo Fong; Richard Roundtree; Cameron Mitchell; Stack Pierce; Hope Holiday; Diane Stevenett; Bernie Nelson; Danene Pyant; James Lew; Branscombe Richmond
- Cinematography: Frank Harris
- Edited by: Frank Harris
- Music by: Herman Jeffreys; Diane Stevenett; Daryl Stevenett
- Distributed by: Crown International Pictures
- Release date: March 1984
- Running time: 80 min
- Country: United States
- Language: English

Killpoint is a 1984 American action film directed by Frank Harris that stars Richard Roundtree, Cameron Mitchell, Leo Fong, Stack Pierce, Hope Holiday, and Diane Stevenett.

== Synopsis ==
A psychopathic illegal arms dealer, Joe Marks (Mitchell), and his gang headed by Nighthawk (Pierce), rob a National Guard armory with the intent of selling arms to gangs and criminals in Los Angeles. Lt. James Long (Fong), and FBI agent Bill Bryant (Roundtree), go after Marks.

== Background ==
The music for the film was provided by Herman Jeffreys and Darryl Stevenett. Stevenett performed four songs for the film which were I'm Getting Old", "Truck Drivin' Man", "Cheatin' On Yer Daddy", and "Good Men Die Young". Ramona Gibbons sang the Herman Jeffreys composition "Livin' On The Inside".

Two characters in the film were played by genuine law enforcement officers: Michael Farrell, a real-life police captain, played Lieutenant James Long's boss Captain Skidmore; and Agent Crawford was played by real-life Special Agent Larry Lunsford.

According to the American Film Institute, part of the film is based on a real-life events. Real policemen and gang members were hired for the film. A scene, the mass killing at a Chinese restaurant was one of them. Director and producer Frank Harris was a news reporter who personally witnessed the violence in the streets. He had also worked on police training films.

== Sequel ==
Fong reprised his role as James Long in the 1993 film Showdown, which he also directed.
