= 18 Fingers of Death! =

2006 film

- Directed by: James Lew
- Written by: James Lew
- Produced by: Ellen English
- Starring: Maurice Patton; Pat Morita; Lisa Arturo
- Cinematography: Jan Michalik
- Music by: Aaron Bolden; Eddie Griffin Jr. Steve Yeaman
- Distributed by: Screen Media Films
- Release date: April 11, 2006
- Running time: 87 minutes
- Country: United States
- Language: English

18 Fingers of Death! is a 2006 American independent mockumentary martial arts comedy film written and directed by and starring James Lew. Also starring are Maurice Patton as Ronald Mack, Pat Morita as Mr. Lee, and Lisa Arturo as Sushi Cue. Lori Beth Denberg also appears in the film.

== Premise ==
The film is a martial arts movie star mockumentary in the loose tradition of This Is Spinal Tap.

== Cast ==
- James Lew as Buford Lee
  - Ho-Sung Pak as Young Buford Lee
    - Booboo Stewart as Kid Buford Lee
- Shane Aaron as Quincy Tarantula
- Lisa Arturo as Sushi Cue
- Paige Baxter as Ms. Turlow
- Erik Betts as Tyrone
- Aaron Bolden as Maurice Griffin
- Charlie George Brown as Chuck Snorris
- George Cheung as Dr. Fook Yu (credited as George Kee Cheung)
- Roark Critchlow as Lew Jameson
- Lori Beth Denberg as Shirley House
- Joey Diaz as Sammy Delassandro
- Christina Franco as Rosa Rita
- Kirk Graves as Steven Seefood
- Brad Greenquist as Franz Guudentightt
- Eddie Griffin Jr. as Malik Walker
- Jerry Guerin as Teddy Tuner
- Vincent Guisetti as Michael Easton
- Marc Hatchell as Roger Eburp
- Joe Jones as Homeless Joe
- Lorenzo Lamas as Antonio Bandana
- June Kyoto Lu as Mrs. Lee
- Kristopher Medina as Not So Big
- John Montana as Bernie Bergstein (credited as John Eric Montana)
- Martin Morales as Tim Tarzana
- Pat Morita as Freeman Lee
- Maurice Patton as Ronald Mack
- James Price as Courton Joy
- Murray Rubinstein as Joel Gold
- Diane Sellers as Mamma Mack
- Robin Shou as Jackie Chong
- Rico Simonini as Mafia Boss
- Cary Thompson as Cisco Thunder (credited as Carey Thompson)
- Bokeem Woodbine as Billy Buff
- Don "The Dragon" Wilson as Himself
- Marty Yacobian as Caleb Harris
- Richard Voigts as Mr. Decker (credited Richard Voights)
- Squeen Holzen as Dominatrix
- Erica Shepard as Bling Bling Girl
- Jenna Bailey as Starlet #1
- Christina Knizner as Statlet #2
