= Warriors of the Apocalypse (2009 film) =

- Directed by: Len Kabasinski
- Written by: Len Kabasinski
- Starring: Darian Caine Brian Anthony
- Release date: 2009
- Country: USA
- Language: English

Warriors of the Apocalypse is a 2009 science fiction action film directed by Len Kabasinski. It is also known as Apocalypse Female Warriors,. and it unrelated to the 1986 film Warriors of the Apocalypse.

== Premise ==
After World War III reduces the world to an atomic wasteland, four female wastelanders trek to one last remaining city, fighting off mercenaries, zombies, and other dangers along the way.

They are attempting to survive long enough to make it to the last city, where resources are rumors to be plentiful.

However, the dictator of that city, Rollins, doesn't want her city overpopulated so she sends out her team of mercenaries to hunt and eliminate any “survivors” in the wastelands.

The four females, along with the help of a man, Harris, out to avenge the death of his family, fight their way to the city.

== Cast ==
Brian Anthony ....... Harris

Darian Caine ....... Luca

Debbie D ....... Rollins

Pamela Sutch ....... Spring,

Amara Offhaus ....... Vick

Renee Porada ....... Carrie

Brian Arrington

Gary Barickman

Luc Bernier

Matt Borczon

Bob Dobiesz

== Home Release ==
As of June 2020, the movie is available to stream on several platforms.
