= Terror Night =

- Bloody Movie DVD cover
- Directed by: Nick Marino; Andre de Toth (uncredited); Fred Lincoln (uncredited)
- Written by: Kenneth J. Hall; Murray Levy; David Rigg
- Story by: Nick Marino
- Produced by: Nick Marino; Nancy Paloian
- Starring: John Ireland; Cameron Mitchell; Alan Hale Jr. Staci Greason; William Butler; Michelle Bauer
- Cinematography: John V. Fante; R. Michael Stringer; Howard Wexler
- Edited by: Art Luciani
- Music by: Bruce Hanifan
- Release date: 1989
- Running time: 84 minutes
- Country: United States
- Language: English

Terror Night (also known as Bloody Movie) is a 1989 American slasher film directed by Nick Marino.

== Plot ==
In the 1920s, silent film star Lance Hayward had a promising career, only to vanish abruptly. Years later, his dilapidated estate is put up for sale. Hayward reemerges to murder the two businessmen responsible. A group of friends see a news report about Hayward and decide to visit his mansion. They make it inside, running into a biker and his girlfriend who have also. They are picked off one by one by Hayward, who dresses in a different costume of his for each kill. When only two teens are left (the only ones who were fans of his), they ignite the silver nitrate-coated film reels discovered earlier. The resulting explosion burns the house, seemingly taking Hayward with it. The two survivors are questioned at home by a police detective. Hayward suddenly reappears, badly burned, and kills all three of them. He walks off, disappearing into the night.

== Cast ==
- John Ireland as Lance Hayward
- Cameron Mitchell as Detective Sanders
- Alan Hale Jr. as Jake Nelson
- Staci Greason as Kathy
- William Butler as Chip
- Michelle Bauer as Jo
- Timothy Elwell as Angel
- Carla Baron as Lorraine
- Ken Abraham as Greg
- Jamie Summers (credited as Denise Stafford) as Sherry
- Aldo Ray as Captain Ned
- Dan Haggerty as Ted Michaels

== Production ==
While producer Nick Marino is credited as the director, numerous cast and crew members assert that several uncredited directors worked on the film, including Fred Lincoln and Andre de Toth (the latter of whom had not officially directed a film for almost 20 years). Several accounts claim that de Toth convinced veteran actors John Ireland and Cameron Mitchell to join the cast, and shot the scenes they appear in after the majority of principal photography had been completed. De Toth wore a neckbrace during shooting, after suffering an injury.

One shooting location was an estate which had once belonged to Errol Flynn.

== Release ==
Although filming was completed in 1989, no record appears to exist of the film having an official release until 2004, when Fred Olen Ray's Retromedia put it on DVD under the title Bloody Movie. A Legacy Entertainment release from 2005 uses the film's original title.

== Critical reception ==
AllMovie called the film a "substandard horror film" and that "the real fun to be had in Terror Night is its virtually limitless source of bizarre trivia for dedicated exploitation buffs." DVD Talk's Daniel W. Kelly wrote, "With a storyline revolving around vintage movies and appearances by some recognizable has-beens, the film has more of a camp quality than horror. It's not the worst of the genre, but it's not the best. It's a bit simple and unexciting."
