= Raw Force =

1982 film directed by Edward D. Murphy

- Theatrical release poster
- Directed by: Edward D. Murphy
- Written by: Edward D. Murphy
- Produced by: Frank E. Johnson
- Starring: Cameron Mitchell; Geoff Binney; Jillian Kesner; John Dresden; Jennifer Holmes; Hope Holiday
- Cinematography: Frank E. Johnson
- Edited by: Eric Lindemann
- Music by: Walter Murphy
- Production company: Ansor International
- Distributed by: American Panorama
- Release date: 1982
- Running time: 86 minutes
- Countries: Philippines; United States
- Language: English

Raw Force (also known as Kung Fu Cannibals) is a 1982 martial arts action horror film written and directed by Edward D. Murphy. An international co-production of the Philippines and the United States, it stars Cameron Mitchell, Geoff Binney, Jillian Kesner, John Dresden, Jennifer Holmes and Hope Holiday.

== Plot ==
The Burbank Karate club travel to a forbidden island of disgraced martial artists to do battle with zombies, mercenaries, cannibals and kung fu masters so deadly and sinister they had to be banished to the Island of Raw Force.

== Cast ==
- Cameron Mitchell as Captain Harry Dodds
- Geoffrey Binney as Mike O'Malley
- Hope Holiday as Hazel Buck
- Jillian Kesner as "Cookie" Winchell
- John Dresden as John Taylor
- Jennifer Holmes as Ann Davis
- Rey King as Go Chin
- Carla Reynolds as Eilleen Fox
- Carl Anthony as Lloyd Davis
- Jewel Shepard as Drunk Sexpot
- Vic Díaz as Monk
- Camille Keaton as Girl In Toilet

== Home media ==
In October 2014, Raw Force was released on Blu-ray and DVD by Vinegar Syndrome.

== See also ==
- List of martial arts films
