= Texas Lightning (film) =

- Theatrical poster
- Directed by: Gary Graver
- Written by: Gary Graver
- Produced by: Jim Sotos
- Starring: Cameron Mitchell; Cameron Mitchell Jr.; Maureen McCormick; Peter Jason
- Cinematography: Gary Graver; Bruce M. Pasternack
- Edited by: Drake Silliman
- Music by: Tommy Vig
- Distributed by: Film Ventures International
- Release date: June 21, 1981
- Running time: 91 minutes
- Country: United States
- Language: English

Texas Lightning is a 1981 film written and directed by Gary Graver and starring Cameron Mitchell, Cameron Mitchell Jr., Maureen McCormick, and Peter Jason.

The film was originally intended as a serious drama that was to be called The Boys, but the producers demanded that Graver re-edit it into a comedy.

== Premise ==
A tough, macho, truck driver decides to make his soft son more manly by taking him hunting. They vacation and go to a honky tonk bar where the younger man falls in love with a burned out waitress.

== Cast ==
- Cameron Mitchell as Karl Stover
- Cameron Mitchell Jr. as Buddy Owen (as Channing Mitchell)
- Maureen McCormick as Fay
- Peter Jason as Frank Whitman
- J. L. Clark as Leonard Simpson
- Hope Holiday as Mrs. Stover
- Charles Dierkop as Walt
- Adam Wade as Highway Patrolman

== Soundtrack ==
- "Mama Don't Let Your Cowboys Grow Up to Be Babies"

Performed by Tony Joe White

- "Typical Day"

Composed and Sung by Maureen McCormick

- "Texas Lightning"

Lyrics by Christopher Adler Music by Tommy Vig
