= Leather Gloves =

1948 film by Richard Quine, William Asher

- Theatrical release poster
- Directed by: Richard Quine; William Asher
- Starring: Cameron Mitchell
- Cinematography: Henry Freulich
- Edited by: Viola Lawrence
- Production company: Columbia Pictures
- Distributed by: Columbia Pictures
- Release date: November 11, 1948
- Running time: 75 minutes
- Country: United States
- Language: English

Leather Gloves is a 1948 American film noir drama sport film directed by Richard Quine and William Asher and starring Cameron Mitchell and Virginia Grey. It is also known as Loser takes all and Winner Takes Nothing.

== Plot summary ==
Former boxer Dave Collins leaves the city to get away from his previous life to hide out in the southwest. He applies for a job in a sleepy old town and is immediately offered by bar owner Bernie, to fight the local champ, Vince Reedy. The prize if he wins is $200.

Dave agrees and starts training, assisted by an old drunk, Dudley. After a few days in town he meets the beautiful bar waitress, Cathy, who only has eyes for his opponent, Vince. Cathy wants Vince to lose so that he stops fighting altogether, marry her and start a family.

A wealthy widow named Janet Gilbert notices Dave and falls in love with him. She wants him to lose the fight and marry her. Dave offers Vince to lose the fight for $200. He also gets $100 as an advance payment from Bernie and asks Dudley to place a bet for $200 on Vince to win the fight.

Bernie finds out that Dave is planning to let Vince win, and they all bet on Vince to win. During the fight, Dave changes his mind and puts an effort into his boxing. He wins the fight and infuriates everyone who has placed bets on Vince. Dave barely escapes from being beat up, aided by Janet, and flees town, leaving Janet behind. He is happy for the sake of Cathy who is able to marry Vince, and that he has proven himself as a prize fighter. He finds a job at a ranch and puts an end to his fighting career for good.

== Cast ==
- Cameron Mitchell as Dave Collins
- Virginia Grey as Jane Gilbert
- Jane Nigh as Cathy
- Sam Levene as Bernie
- Henry O'Neill as Dudley
