= Enforcer from Death Row =

- Directed by: Marshall M. Borden; Efren C. Piñon
- Written by: Leo Fong
- Produced by: Michael Badway; Leo Fong; Michael Sullivan
- Starring: Leo Fong; Booker T. Anderson; Ann Farber; Darnell Garcia; John Hammond; James Lew; Cameron Mitchell; Mariwin Roberts.
- Cinematography: Frank Harris
- Production companies: Cinevision International Corporation; Koinonia Psi West Productions
- Distributed by: Bedford Entertainment theatrical (US)
- Release date: July 1976; Philippines
- Running time: 98 mins
- Country: Philippines
- Language: English

Enforcer from Death Row is a film directed by Marshall M. Borden and Efren C. Piñon. It stars Leo Fong, Booker T. Anderson, Ann Farber, Darnell Garcia, John Hammond, James Lew, Cameron Mitchell and Mariwin Roberts. The film has two different endings, depending on which release is watched. It is also known as Ninja Assassins, Ninja Nightmare and Death Row Killer.

== Background ==
The film was directed by two directors, Marshall M. Borden and Efren C. Piñon. The story was by Leo Fong and Jerry O. Tirazona. It was shot on location in the Philippines. The production companies were Koinonia PSI West Productions and Cinevision International Corporation. The film is also known as The Outside Man.

The star of the film, Leo Fong, was a Methodist minister who grew up in Arkansas.

== Story ==
An international peace keeping agency rescues a former Army Ranger from execution and sends him on a mission to bust up a dangerous spy ring. T.L. Young (played by Leo Fong) is sent to the gas chamber and his death there is faked. He is offered $100,000 to stop the dangerous spy ring that has got hold of a deadly chemical weapon.

== Viewing ==
In early 1982, it was playing in the Bronx at Loews Paradise. In Brooklyn it was showing at Loews Metropolitan and the Granada. In Queens it was showing at the Alden, and in Essex County it was showing at the Branford. It was released on VHS through 21st Genesis Home Video.

== Releases ==
Title	Release info	Year	Format	Country	Time	Notes
The Ninja Enforcer	JEL Video 5012		VHS	Norway	84 mins	
Enforcer from Death Row	VUH 18040		VHS, Beta			
Enforcer from Death Row	Starbase	1977	VHS	Australia		
Enforcer from Death Row	Lightning Video ISBN 0-8051-0190-X	1987	VHS	U.S.	87 mins	
Enforcer from Death Row	21st Genesis Home Video GV24	1987	VHS, Beta			
