= Akosua Busia =

Ghanaian actress and writer (born 1966)

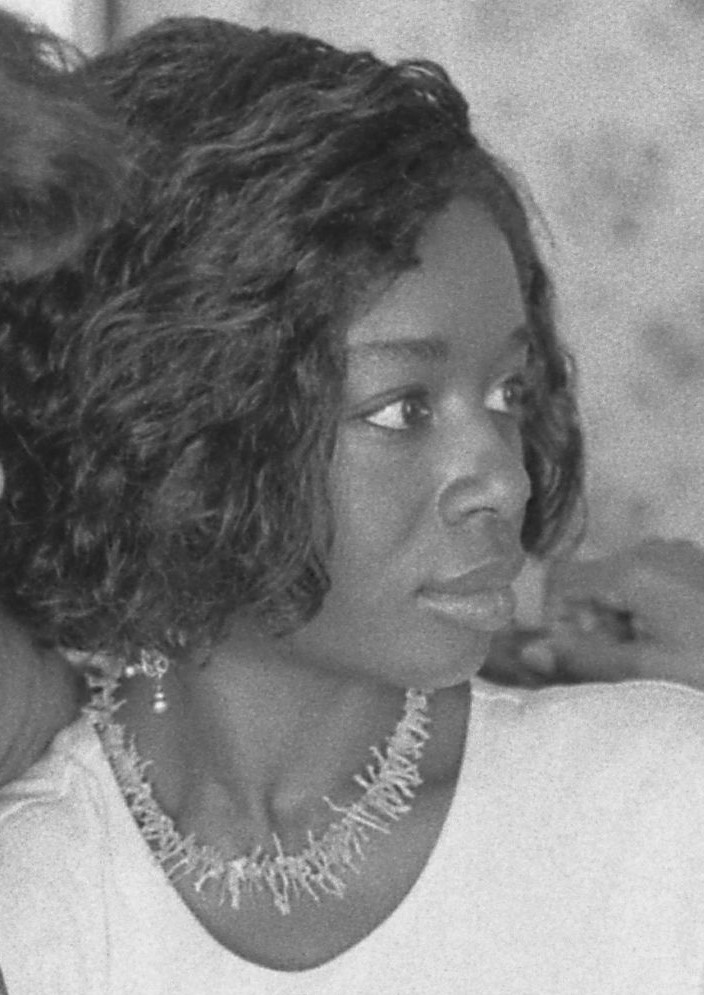
- Busia in 1986
- Born: Akosua Gyamama Busia; 30 December 1966 (age 59); Accra, Ghana
- Education: Central School of Speech and Drama
- Occupations: Actress, film director, songwriter, author
- Years active: 1979–present
- Known for: Nettie Harris – The Color Purple
- Spouse: John Singleton (m. 1996; div. 1997)
- Children: 1
- Father: Kofi Abrefa Busia
- Relatives: Abena Busia (sister)
- Website: akosuabusia.net/oganization

Akosua Gyamama Busia (born 30 December 1966) is a Ghanaian actress, writer and songwriter. She is known to film audiences for playing Nettie Harris in the 1985 film The Color Purple. She is the daughter of Ghanaian Prime Minister Kofi Abrefa Busia.

== Early life ==
Busia was born in Accra in 1966. She is the daughter of Kofi Abrefa Busia, who was prime minister of the Republic of Ghana (from 1969 to 1972) and a prince of the royal family of Wenchi, a subgroup of the Ashanti, making Akosua a princess too. Her sister, Abena Busia, is a poet and academic, who was a professor in English at Rutgers University, and since 2017 has been the Ghanaian ambassador to Brazil.

Busia grew up in Ghana, and began her acting career at the age of 16, attending London's Central School of Speech and Drama on scholarship. Her first acting role was as Juliet in an otherwise white cast, performing Shakespeare's Romeo and Juliet at Oxford University, where her siblings were studying.

== Career ==
Busia made her film debut in the 1979 adventure film Ashanti, with Michael Caine and Peter Ustinov. After moving to Los Angeles in the early 1980s, she was cast to play a supporting role in the slasher film The Final Terror, directed by Andrew Davis (The Fugitive). The film was not released until 1983, after several of its actors (including Daryl Hannah and Rachel Ward) had achieved public prominence.

Busia's film roles include a notable performance as Bessie in a 1986 film adaptation of Richard Wright's novel Native Son (with Geraldine Page and Matt Dillon). She also starred in Hard Lessons alongside Denzel Washington and Lynn Whitfield in 1986. Busia played Nettie, the younger sister of Whoopi Goldberg's character Celie Harris, in Steven Spielberg's 1985 The Color Purple, adapted from Alice Walker's novel of the same title, as Ruth in Badge of the Assassin (1985), as Jewel in John Singleton's Rosewood (1997), and as Patience in Antoine Fuqua's Tears of the Sun (2003). She has also appeared on television in the series ER.

Busia is the author of The Seasons of Beento Blackbird: A Novel (Washington Square Press, 1997, ISBN 9780671014094). She was one of three co-writers for the screenplay adaptation of Toni Morrison's 1987 novel Beloved for the 1998 film version of the same name directed by Jonathan Demme. In 2008, Busia directed a film about her father: The Prof. A Man Remembered. Life, Vision & Legacy of K.A. Busia. Busia also co-wrote the song "Moon Blue" with Stevie Wonder for his album A Time 2 Love, released in 2005. Her poem "Mama" is included in the 2019 anthology New Daughters of Africa, edited by Margaret Busby.

After an 18-year hiatus to raise her daughter, in 2016 Busia returned to acting in the off-Broadway and Broadway production of Danai Gurira's play Eclipsed, alongside Lupita Nyong'o. For her performance off-Broadway, she received an Obie Award for Distinguished Performance as Rita

In 2024, Busia released the drama film In Search of a Blessed Life: He Who Hath, which was inspired by the book He that Hath, to Him Shall Be Given by Dag Heward-Mills. Later that same year, Busia's documentary Stevie Wonder in Ghana: In Search of a Blessed Life was also released.

== Personal life ==
On 12 October 1996, Akosua Busia married the American film director John Singleton, with whom she has a daughter — Hadar Busia-Singleton (born 3 April 1997); the couple divorced on 15 June 1997. Their daughter attended school in Ghana, before returning to the US.

She co-founded with her sister Abena Busia the Busia Foundation International, aiming "to provide assistance to the disadvantaged".

== Filmography ==
=== Film ===
Year	Title	Role	Notes
1979	Ashanti	The Senoufo Girl	
1983	The Final Terror	Vanessa	
1984	Louisiana	Ivy	TV movie
1985	Badge of the Assassin	Ruth	TV movie
1985	The Color Purple	Nettie Harris	
1986	Crossroads	Woman at Boardinghouse	
1986	Low Blow	Karma	
1986	Hard Lessons	Cynthia Byers	
1986	Native Son	Bessie	
1988	Saxo	Puppet	
1988	The Seventh Sign	Penny Washburn	
1991	New Jack City	Courtroom Spectator	Uncredited
1997	Rosewood	Jewel	
1997	Mad City	Diane	
1997	Ill Gotten Gains	Fey	
2003	Tears of the Sun	Patience Ozokwor	
2007	Ascension Day	Cherry	
2024	In Search of a Blessed Life	Mrs. Johnson	Drama
2024	Stevie Wonder in Ghana: In Search of a Blessed Life		Documentary, inspired by Busia's drama of the same name
