= Leo Fong =

American actor (1928–2022)

- Born: Fung Tin Leon; 23 November 1928; Xinhui, Jiangmen, Guangdong, China
- Died: 18 February 2022 (aged 93); Los Angeles, California, U.S.
- Education: Hendrix College (BA); Southern Methodist University (ThM); California State University, Sacramento (MSW)
- Years active: 1974-2022

Chinese name
- Traditional Chinese: 馮天倫
- Simplified Chinese: 冯天伦
Transcriptions
Standard Mandarin
- Hanyu Pinyin: Féng Tiānlún
- Wade–Giles: Fêng^{2} Tʻien^{1}-lun^{2}
Yue: Cantonese
- Jyutping: Fung^{4} Tin^{1}-leon^{4}
- IPA: [fʊŋ˩ tʰin˥.lɵn˩]
other Yue
- Taishanese: fuung˨ hen˧ leon˨
- Website: www.leotfong.com

Leo Fong (Chinese: 馮天倫; 23 November 1928 – 18 February 2022) was a Chinese-American martial artist, actor, boxer, and Methodist minister who had been making films, acting, and directing since the early 1970s. Fong was still acting in action films into his early 90s. Some of his films, such as Killpoint and Low Blow, are considered cult classics.

== Background ==
Fong was born on 23 November 1928 in Xinhui county (present Xinhui district of the city of Jiangmen), located in the province of Guangzhou, China. Fong soon relocated to Seattle with his parents and siblings. They were detained for a time, as was common with immigrants from Asia. Upon being released in Seattle, the family traveled to Chicago, where Fong's maternal uncle owned a restaurant in which his father had been guaranteed work. Working at the restaurant, Fong's father saved enough money to purchase a small grocery store in Widener, Arkansas, a small agricultural community. Fong was the victim of racial taunts at school, which often led to fights. Fong eventually took up boxing at age 15.

After graduating from Forrest City High School, Fong attended Hendrix College in Arkansas, where he received a B.A. in physical education. He later received a master's degree in theology from Southern Methodist University. After beginning his career as a Methodist minister, he earned a Master of Social Work from California State University, Sacramento. Fong remained in Northern California, where he continued his martial arts training.

His entry into eastern martial arts began in the 1950s with judo and jiu jitsu. Fong studied and practiced various martial arts styles until he developed his own style, Wei Kuen Do.

Fong was a friend of martial artist Bruce Lee, who arranged for him to appear on the cover of the tenth anniversary edition of Black Belt magazine.

== Film career ==
=== 1970s ===
The first film in which he acted was Murder in the Orient (1974), a Filipino martial arts exploitation film that co-starred Ron Marchini and also features Eva Reyes and Rodolfo 'Boy' Garcia. In 1975, he starred in Bamboo Trap with Filipino actors George Estregan, Chanda Romero, Eddie Garcia, Rez Cortez and Ron van Clief.

Beginning in the late 1970s, Fong branched out into writing, directing, and producing films. Some of his films in the seventies to mid-'80s feature the same stock of actors, Cameron Mitchell, Hope Holiday and Stack Pierce.

=== 1980s to 1990s ===
In Killpoint, directed by Frank Harris, Fong played Liutenant James Long, an L.A based policeman. Long teamed up with an FBI agent (played by Richard Roundtree) to hunt down the men who stole weapons from the National Guard armory and stop them from selling them to street gangs.

In 1986, he starred in Low Blow, another Frank Harris film, with Cameron Mitchell, Akosua Busia, Stack Pierce, Diane Stevenett and Troy Donahue. Long starred as San Francisco-based P.I. Joe Wong, operating from his untidy office. Wong is tasked to rescue a young heiress from a strange religious cult.

The same year, Fong co-directed Blood Street with George Chung. The Wong character was reprised, this time tasked to find a woman's missing husband. Wong embarks on a journey though the world of the criminal. Along the way he encounters a father-son team of Solomon and Bones, played by Stack Pierce and Chuck Jeffreys. Wong would appear a third time in the 2010 film Hard Way Heroes that also starred Patrick Johnson, Joseph Guinan, and Mel Novak.

The James Long character appeared again in the 1993 film Showdown, about a biker Mafia retirement village called Sanctuary which is invaded by a biker gang. Werner Hoetzinger, Michelle McCormick, Richard Lynch and Troy Donaghue also appear in the film.

=== 2000s ===
A more recent film of his is Transformed, a 2005 film with Christian themes and anti-drug message that features Tadashi Yamashita and Fred Williamson. He has worked with Williamson on a movie twice prior to this one. The first was the 1978 movie Blind Rage, which follows a group of blind men who rob a bank. As well as acting in Transformed, he also directed and produced it, composed the theme song and was involved in the editing. His latest film work includes Drifter TKD, a 2008 film in which he plays Master Lee and The Last Musketeer, which he produced.

=== Work with Len Kabasinski ===
Fong co-starred in the 2018 film Challenge of Five Gauntlets, directed by Len Kabasinski. In a review of the film, film reviewer The Cinema Drunkie gave it a very good review, saying that the movie ruled and it was Len's finest work yet. There was also the comment on Leo Fong saying the standout had to be the man the myth and Mr, Low Blow himself, and how great it was to see him kicking ass again. John M. Jerva of Action-Flix.com said that it was a throwback to the great days of the '80s when films of this type swarmed the shelves of the video stores. Fong's last role was in another Kabasinski film, Pact of Vengeance which was released in 2022. He played the part of Zian, the owner of Champion's Garage who turns to his old outfit “The Obliterators” to help deal with an extortion gang who have attacked his granddaughter. Jon Mikl Thor, Diamante and Peter Avalon also star in the film. The film was screened in the Dipson Eastern Hills Cinema for the Buffalo Dreams Fantastic Film Festival at 9:30pm on Friday, August 19, 2022.

=== Fongsploitation ===
Over the years, Fongsploitation, a type of exploitation film subgenre attached to Fong, has been noted. In a 2015 review of Enforcer from Death Row, Johnny Larue's Crane Shot refers to the film as "one of the earliest Fongsploitation classics". In a review of Killpoint and Low Blow, the Good Efficiency Butchery review site gave the heading "Retro Review, Special Fongsploitation Edition: KILLPOINT (1984) and LOW BLOW (1986)" for the review of the two films.

== Personal life and death ==
Fong died on 18 February 2022, at the age of 93. He is survived by his wife Minerva, three children, his grandchildren, and his youngest sister.

== Selected filmography ==
Director

- 24 Hours to Midnight (1985)
- Fight to Win (also known as Eyes of the Dragon or Dangerous Passages) (1987)
- Blood Street (1988)
- Hawkeye (also known as Karate Cops) (1988)
- Showdown (1993)

Actor

- Murder in the Orient (1974)
- Tiger's Revenge (1975)
- Bamboo Trap (1975)
- Enforcer from Death Row (1976) as T. L. Young
- Blind Rage (1978) as Lin Wang
- The Last Reunion (1980) as Tamon Matsuda
- Killpoint (1984) as Lt. James Long
- Ninja Assassins (1985)
- 24 Hours to Midnight (1985) as Mr. Big
- Low Blow (1986) as Joe Wong
- Rapid Fire (1988)
- License to Kill (1988)
- Jungle Heat (1988)
- Blood Street (1988) as Joe Wong
- Showdown (1993) as James Long
- Cage II (1994) as Tanaka
- Carjack (1996) as Lee's Boss
- Transformed (2005) as the Fist
- Drifter TKD (2008) as Master Lee
- Thunderkick (2008) as Master Wong
- The Shadow Boxer (2012) as Chi Master
- Hard Way Heroes (2016) as Joe Wong
- Challenge of Five Gauntlets (2018) as Sang-Jin
- Pact of Vengeance (2022) as Zian

== Publications ==
- Choy Lay Fut Kung-Fu by Leo Fong
- Si Lum Kung-Fu: The Chinese art of Self-Defense by Leo Fong
- Beyond Kung Fu: Breaking an Opponent's Power Through Relaxed Tension by Leo Fong
- Tiger Claw: Training & Techniques by Leo Fong
- Modified Wing Chun by Leo Fong
- Power Training in Kung-Fu by Ron Marchini and Leo Fong

== Fighting Style ==
Wei Kuen Do is a dynamic martial arts system that integrates approaches from multiple disciplines, including Jeet Kune Do, Serrada Escrima, Western Boxing, Choy Lay Fut, Northern Shaolin, Wrestling, Tang Soo Do, Tae Kwon Do, Karate, Judo, Jujutsu, Arnis, and Wing Chun. On March 24, 2017, Leo Fong appointed a three-person board to oversee the continued instruction and propagation of Wei Kuen Do. The current board members, who carry on Fong's original appointment, are Klein Buen and Bong Tumaru-Fong.
