= Hope Holiday =

American actress

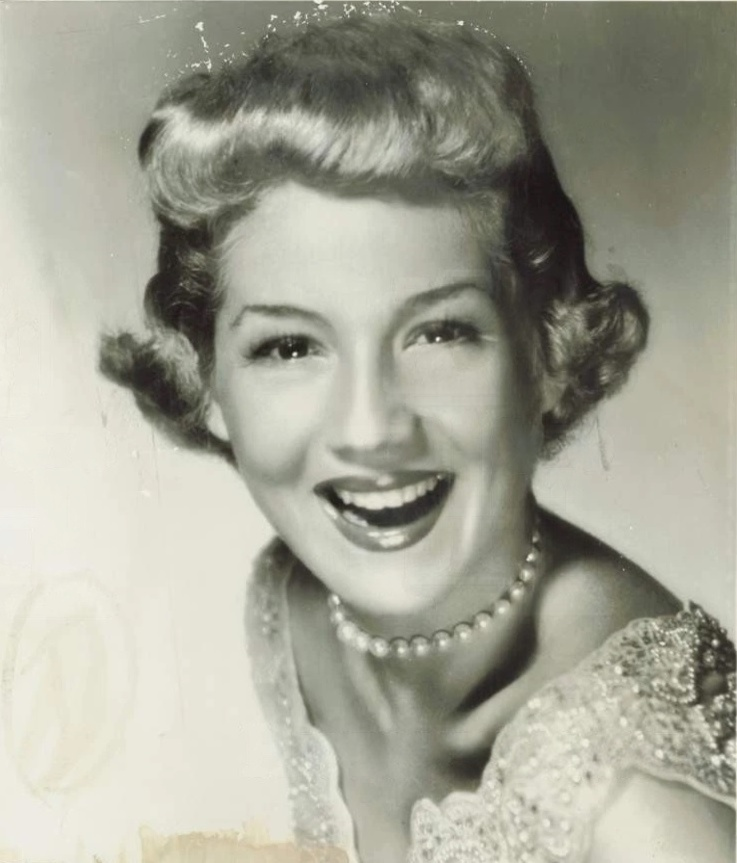
- Holiday in 1957
- Born: Brooklyn, New York, U.S.
- Occupations: Actress, producer
- Spouse: Frank Marth (m. 1967; died 2014)

Hope Holiday is an American actress, perhaps best known for her role as Mrs. Margie MacDougall in the Billy Wilder film The Apartment (1960).

== Early years ==
Holiday was born in Brooklyn, New York, and was raised in Manhattan. Her father, a burlesque entertainer who was the son of Russian-Jewish immigrants, changed his name from Allen Zaslawsky to Allen Zee before his daughters were born. She attended Public School 117 in Jamaica, Queens, and then went to Forest Hills High School.

She dropped out of high school and sang at the Copacabana nightclub. Her father was also described by Ed Sullivan as a "Capitol Theater exec." Her mother, Doris, worked in the production department at radio station WHN in New York City. Her father at one time was night manager of WHN. She had an elder sister, Judy, whose stage name was Judy Sinclair.

=== Name change ===
A column in the June 30, 1954, issue of the Brooklyn Eagle noted Zee's change of names: "At the Guy Lombardo extravaganza, 'Arabian Night,' the lassie that almost walked away with the show was Hope Holiday. Hope, before this show, used the name of Hope Zee ..." She later recalled:

I had a featured role as the Teeny Weeny Genie and got to sing two songs. Before this show I had been billed as "Hope Zee," but since my father was a producer of the show along with Lombardo, he purposely changed my name in the program, as he didn't want audiences thinking there was any nepotism involved. I literally had no say in choosing my new name. Since he loved Judy Holliday, Daddy decided to call me "Hope Holiday" without the extra "L." I hated the name at first but ending up keeping it.

== Career ==
=== Stage ===
Holiday has extensive Broadway musical comedy background, beginning with dancing in the chorus lines in Top Banana and Guys and Dolls. As Hope Zee, she also was understudy to Rose Marie in Top Banana, but when the star had to be gone for a week, Zee was laid off, and Audrey Meadows was hired to take over the part. In 1949, she played Fifi and was a member of the singing ensemble of Gentlemen Prefer Blondes. In the 1956 Broadway production of Li'l Abner, Holiday was understudy for Mammy Yokum in addition to being a featured dancer.

=== Singing ===
In the early 1950s, Holiday (billed as Hope Zee) sang with Ralph Flanagan's orchestra. An August 4, 1950, newspaper column by Dorothy Kilgallen reported, "Hope Zee ... quit 'Gentlemen Prefer Blondes' last week to become vocalist with Ralph Flanagan's band ..."

== Personal life ==
Holiday is the widow of actor Frank Marth. They were married April 9, 1967. Marth died in January 2014.

Published in February 2022, Holiday and fellow actresses Lainie Kazan, Anna Maria Alberghetti, Renée Taylor. Jill St. John, and Karen Sharpe gave interviews to Vanity Fair alleging incidents of sexual assault and harassment by the late comic actor Jerry Lewis, who died in 2017. Sharpe detailed an incident on the set of The Ladies Man (1961) in which Lewis lured her to his dressing room, pressed a button to lock the door, and masturbated in her presence without her consent. She further alleged that when she slapped him, as scripted during a scene, (harder than expected), the following day, production was briefly halted; the two never spoke again. Holiday tells a story of a different actor visiting her address, pulling her into a bedroom by the hair and raping her. She said he just zipped up his pants and she never saw him again.

== Selected filmography ==
=== Actress ===
- Li'l Abner (1959) .... Chorus Dancer (uncredited)
- The Apartment (1960) .... Mrs. Margie MacDougall
- The Ladies Man (1961) .... Miss Anxious
- Have Gun Will Travel (1961, TV Series) .... Big Red
- Irma la Douce (1963) .... Lolita
- The New Phil Silvers Show (1963, TV Series, Episode "The Son of Pygmalion,") .... Mildred Flitterman
- The Rounders (1965) .... Sister
- How to Seduce a Woman (1974) .... Mary
- The Hughes Mystery (1979)
- The Return of Mod Squad (1979, TV Movie) .... Willy
- The Last Reunion (1980) .... Sally the Singer
- Texas Lightning (1981) .... Mrs. Stover
- Raw Force (1982) .... Hazel Buck
- Killpoint (1984) .... Anita
- Low Blow (1986) .... School Head Mistress (uncredited)

=== Production & casting ===
- Texas Lightning (1981; associate producer)
- Killpoint (1984; associate producer, casting director)
- Rage to Kill (1987; executive producer)
- Code Name Vengeance (1987; executive producer)
- Space Mutiny (1988; executive producer)
