= Stack Pierce =

American actor (1933–2016)

- Stack Pierce in V
- Born: June 15, 1933
- Died: March 1, 2016 (aged 82)
- Other name: Robert Pierce
- Occupations: Athlete, Actor
- Years active: 1970–2005

Robert Stack Pierce (June 15, 1933 – March 1, 2016) was an American actor, boxer and professional baseball player. His acting career began in the early 1970s with television roles in the series Arnie, Room 222, Mannix, Mission Impossible and later as Jake, the alien commander in the 1980s science fiction series V. His film roles include Night Call Nurses, Hammer, Cool Breeze, Low Blow and Weekend at Bernie's II.

== Background ==
Pierce was a state boxing champion. Later he played professional baseball, beginning with the Cleveland Indians organization and later the Milwaukee Braves organization. Having left high school, he joined the army where he was an Airborne Engineer. While in the army he played baseball in the Special Services. He came up on the radar of the Cleveland Indians and was signed to a Major League contract. Not long after the Milwaukee Braves bought his contract and was with them for six years until his retirement in 1960. Later he moved to Los Angeles with his wife.

He has had prominent and recurring roles in a number of Leo Fong exploitation films as well as a few Fred Williamson films. Among the films in which he appeared with Williamson are Hammer (1972), No way Back (1976, in the part of Bernie). Others included, The Big Score (1983), The Messenger (1986) and Transformed (2005).

He has appeared on Michael Dante's radio show, On Deck.

== Acting career ==
=== 1960s to 1970s ===
Pierce's entry into acting came about as a result of his wife's encouragement. She pushed him to audition for his first play, Ebonites. He was diligent in studying acting and did a lot of work with a repertory company.

Pierce first appeared on television in a 1970 episode of Arnie. He moved into film roles in 1972, appearing in three films that year: he played the henchman, Tinker, in Cool Breeze; played the role of Jon Sampson in the Jonathan Kaplan directed Night Call Nurses; and appeared in Hammer, his first of five films, over his career, that starred Fred Williamson.

=== 1980s ===
In 1980, Pierce played Frank Washington in The Last Reunion, his first of seven films, over his career, that starred Leo Fong. In 1980, Pierce was nominated for an NAACP Image Award for his role in the "Sweet Land of Liberty" episode of the television series Quincy, M.E..

He also appeared with Wings Hauser and Beverly Todd in the 1982 cult classic grindhouse film Vice Squad, playing a garage owner who Hauser heads for after escaping from the police. In 1983, he appeared as Captain Jake, the alien commander in the science fiction television series V. In 1984, he was in another Leo Fong film, Killpoint, appearing as Nighthawk, the stone faced henchman for a weapons dealer. In 1986, he was in another Fong film, Low Blow as Duke, in a story about the daughter of a wealthy businessman who was kidnapped by a religious cult and a detective who was hired to get her back.

=== 1990s to 2000s ===
In 1997, Pierce appeared as Will in Paolo Mazzucato's Moonbase, a film about a crew running a garbage dump on the moon and having to ward off deranged escaped inmates from an orbiting prison satellite who are after nuclear weapons buried in the rubbish.

Pierce then stepped away from acting, caring for his wife, Marion, until she died of cancer in June, 1998. In the years after her death, he became a stage director, including productions of A Raisin in the Sun, My Brothers' Blood, In My Father's House and One Last Look.

Pierce made a brief return to acting for the 2005 direct-to-video release Transformed, reuniting with Leo Fong.

== Later activities ==
As he scaled down his acting career, Pierce became involved with youth and charity work.

He revisited baseball, becoming a youth coach in 2006. He booked speaking engagements through Speakers International.

In August 2011, he was involved in the Lenny Wilkens Foundation fundraiser for the Odessa Brown Children's Clinic. In December 2011, Pierce was one of the celebrity golfers in the Dennis James Golf Classic's 16th annual tournament.

Pierce had to step back from coaching baseball after he suffered a stroke in 2012. Despite this, he was able to continue his involvement in charity work. On August 28, 2014, Pierce participated in the 13th annual Jim "Mudcat" Grant golf tournament in Binghamton, New York. Amongst the other celebrities participating in 2014 was Fred Williamson, whom Pierce had worked with in a number of films.

== Awards ==
In July 1978, Pierce, along with musicians Side Effect and D. J. Rogers, was at Reve Gibson's annual Youth On Parade program to pick up an award.

== Death ==
Pierce died on March 1, 2016, in the US.

== Filmography ==
- Cool Breeze (1972) .... Tinker
- Night Call Nurses (1972) .... Jon Sampson
- Hammer (1972) .... Roughhouse
- Trouble Man (1972) .... Collie
- Jarrett (1973, TV Movie) .... Prison guard
- Trader Horn (1973) .... Malugi
- Cleopatra Jones (1973) .... Minor Role (uncredited)
- The Healers (1974, TV Movie)
- Newman's Law (1974) .... Baines
- The Law (1974, TV Movie) .... Bright's Guard, County Jail
- A Cry for Help (1975, TV Movie) .... Sgt. Mike Reese
- The Prisoner of Second Avenue (1975) .... Detective
- Cornbread, Earl and Me (1975) .... Sam Hamilton
- Killer Force (1975) .... Emilio
- The Six Million Dollar Man (1976, TV Series) .... Officer Randolph
- Kiss Me, Kill Me (1976, TV Movie) .... Sergent
- No Way Back (1976) .... Bernie
- The Greatest (1977) .... Johnson
- Lucy Calls the President (1977, TV Movie) .... Secret Service Agent Stockley
- Good Guys Wear Black (1978) .... Holly Washington – The Black Tigers
- Flesh & Blood (1979, TV Movie) .... Big Moony
- The Last Reunion (1980) .... Frank Washington
- The Incredible Hulk (1977-1982) .... Cop / Sgt. Nicholson
- Alcatraz: The Whole Shocking Story (1980, TV Movie) .... Presser
- Charlie and the Great Balloon Chase (1981, TV Movie) .... Lucas
- Vice Squad (1982) .... Roscoe
- V (1983, TV Mini-Series) .... Visitor Captain Jake
- WarGames (1983) .... Airman
- The Big Score (1983) .... New
- Sawyer and Finn (1983, TV Movie) .... Jim
- The Fall Guy (1983, TV Series) (To the Finish S03E11) .... Policeman
- Killpoint (1984) .... Nighthawk
- V: The Final Battle (1984, TV Mini-Series) .... Visitor Captain Jake
- 24 Hours to Midnight (1985) .... White Powder Chan
- Born American (1986) .... The Admiral (voice, uncredited)
- Low Blow (1986) .... Corky
- The Patriot (1986) .... Atkins
- The Messenger (1986) .... Leroy
- I Saw What You Did (1988, TV Movie) .... Policeman
- It's Murphy's Fault (1988) .... Spider Jackson
- Blood Street (1988) .... Solomon
- Enemy Unseen (1989) .... Josh
- No Witnesses (1990)
- A Rage in Harlem (1991) .... Coffin Ed
- Weekend at Bernie's II (1993) .... Claudia's Dad
- Out of Darkness (1994, TV Movie) .... Dr Brook
- Human Desires (1997) .... Smokey
- Moonbase (1997) .... Will
- Transformed (2005) .... The mayor (final film role)
