= Cameron Mitchell (actor) =

American actor (1918–1994)

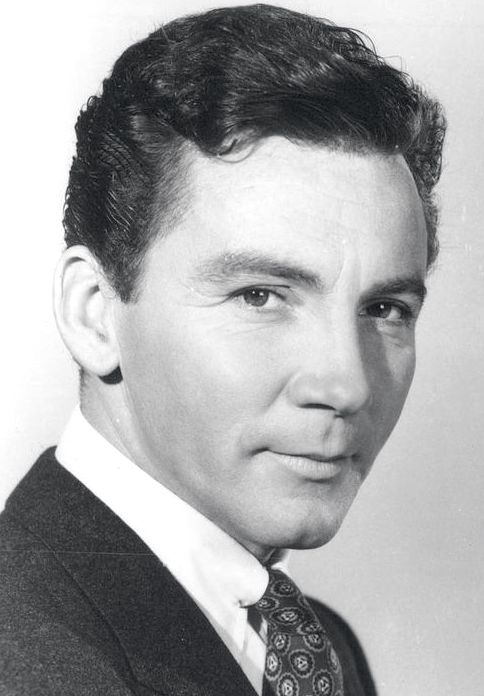
- Mitchell in 1955
- Born: Cameron McDowell Mitzell; November 4, 1918; Dallastown, Pennsylvania, U.S.
- Died: July 6, 1994 (aged 75); Pacific Palisades, California, U.S.
- Resting place: Desert Memorial Park
- Occupation: Actor
- Years active: 1939–1994
- Spouses: Johanna Mendel (m. 1940; div. 1957) Lissa Jacobs Gertz (m. 1957; div. 1974) Margaret Brock Johnson Mozingo (m. 1973; annul. 1976)
- Children: 7
- Military career
- Allegiance: United States
- Branch: United States Army; Army Air Forces
- Service years: 1943-1945
- Rank: 2nd Lieutenant
- Conflicts: World War II

Cameron McDowell Mitchell (né Mitzell; November 4, 1918 – July 6, 1994) was an American actor whose career spanned 55 years across film, stage, and television. Mitchell began his career on Broadway before entering films in the 1950s, appearing in several major features. Later in his career, he became known for his roles in numerous exploitation films in the 1970s and 1980s.

Mitchell began acting on Broadway in the late 1930s before signing a contract with Metro-Goldwyn-Mayer and appearing in such films as Cass Timberlane (1945) and Homecoming (1948). He subsequently originated the role of Happy Loman in the Broadway production of Arthur Miller's Death of a Salesman (1949), a role he reprised in the 1951 film adaptation. With 20th Century Fox, he appeared in How to Marry a Millionaire (1953).

Throughout the 1960s, he appeared in spaghetti Westerns and Italian films―including several collaborations with director Mario Bava―then on U.S. television. Once he made the transition, he was starring as Uncle Buck Cannon on the Western series The High Chaparral (1967–1971). From the mid-1970s through the 1980s, he appeared in numerous exploitation and horror films and television shows.

== Early life and education ==
Mitchell was born Cameron McDowell Mitzell on November 4, 1918, in Dallastown, Pennsylvania, of Scottish and German descent, one of Rev. Charles Michael Mitzell and Kathryn Isabella (née Ehrhart) Mitzell's seven children. Mitchell moved to Chicora, Pennsylvania, in 1921 when his father was accepted as pastor of the St. John's Reformed Church, Butler, Pennsylvania, and grew up in Shrewsbury, Pennsylvania. The family was poor, and Mitchell wore both shoes and coats handed down from his sisters to school.

Mitchell attended Shrewsbury Elementary School in Glen Rock, Pennsylvania. He won first place in a 700-student spelling bee contest in 1933 and was awarded a "large Webster's dictionary". He was a 1936 graduate of New Freedom High School in New Freedom, Pennsylvania.

Active in boxing and other sports in high school, Mitchell was a star baseball pitcher on his school's team. Mitchell turned away from sports, instead choosing to pursue an acting career. He explained his decision, saying "I decided against playing baseball because I thought there wasn't enough security in it. Isn't that silly? I now know there is nothing less secure than acting".

In 1937, Helena Hartenstein, Mitchell's high-school French teacher, lent him the money to travel to New York City, where he auditioned at three acting schools - the Theatre School of Dramatic Arts, the Alviene Master School of the Theatre, and the Academy of Cultural Arts. Although offered a scholarship to attend Alviene, Mitchell chose the Theatre School. Its director, Norman C. Brace, wrote Mitchell's father, saying "... your son should succeed in becoming a very fine artist for the stage, screen or radio." Alviene school director Claude Alviene said of Mitchell "Your son, not only has exceptional dramatic ability, but the quality of his singing voice is so musical... (it) leaves little doubt of an ultimate successful career..."

=== Military service ===
From 1943 to 1945, Mitchell served as a bombardier with the United States Army Air Forces MOS 1035-Bombardier group during World War II. Mitchell recalled, "I was a lousy bombardier -- I never hit anything". Mitchell's final rank was second lieutenant.

== Acting career ==
=== Early years ===
Mitchell recalled his first days in New York City attending acting school, saying, "When I got to New York I had never ridden in an elevator or used a telephone". To make ends meet, he held many jobs, including theater ushering, mail clerking, and washing dishes in restaurants. He was an NBC page at NBC Radio City with then-unknown fellow actor Gregory Peck.

After two years of trying and still hoping to break into acting, Mitchell wrote dozens of letters to actors, agents, and producers in 1939. He received no response from the effort. He said, "I was bitter, mad at everyone. I sat down and wrote a letter to Alfred Lunt. It was the world's worst letter. I hate to think about it. I said I was a better actor than he was, but I was never going to get a chance to prove it".

The highly critical letter pointed out what Mitchell thought was Lunt's poor performance in the movie The Guardsman. Mitchell ended the letter saying, "If you think you can act, you should see me". Lunt answered Mitchell and offered him an audition. Mitchell, realizing his impudence, apologized for having written the letter. Lunt's wife, actress Lynn Fontanne, told him, "Don't worry about what you've done. Acting is your life's work, and you're not only going to be a good actor, but you're [also] going to be a great actor".

Fontanne also advised Mitchell to change his surname from "Mitzell" to "Mitchell", saying she thought his last name would hinder his career due to the then rising anti-German sentiment in America. He took her advice and changed his name.

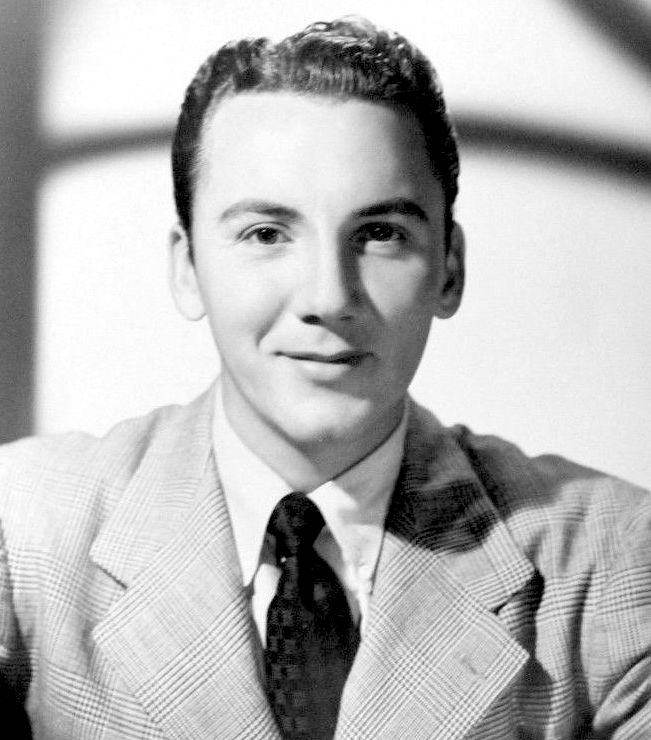
Cameron Mitchell studio portrait circa 1940s

In 1952, Hollywood columnist Hedda Hopper said of Mitchell, "He isn't handsome. He isn't one of the lucky-break boys or the overnight flashes. Cam has gotten there the hard way over an uphill, obstacle-ridden course".

His agent, Ronald Leif, described Mitchell's ability, saying, "A true actor isn't tagged. He isn't a heavy, a comic or a juvenile – he can assume any personality the role demands and play it convincingly. Such a man is Cameron Mitchell".

=== Stage work ===
In 1939, Mitchell made his Broadway debut in a minor role in Jeremiah. He also appeared in the 1939 production of The Taming of the Shrew as a member of Alfred Lunt and Lynn Fontanne's National Theater Company.

In 1941, he appeared again on Broadway in The Trojan Women.

=== Radio career ===
Mitchell also worked in radio throughout his career, both acting and announcing.

In 1942, Mitchell was both station chief announcer and sports announcer at WSRR AM in Stamford, Connecticut. He was reported to have joined the Army Air Forces in July 1943, and would be stationed at Jefferson Barracks, Missouri, where he was scheduled to host a weekly radio show on KFEQ AM in St. Joseph, Missouri. He became an Army Air Corps bombardier, instead.

After World War II, Mitchell continued to act in radio dramas. He starred in the CBS daytime radio show Grand Central Station on January 21, 1950, in the episode "Lost and Found". Each week, the show featured an actor who was then currently appearing on Broadway in New York City.

=== Transition to film ===
Mitchell's film career began in 1945 as a contract actor at Metro-Goldwyn-Mayer (MGM) for three years, with minor roles in films, including brief appearances in What Next, Corporal Hargrove? and They Were Expendable (1945), starring John Wayne and Robert Montgomery. He was featured with Lana Turner and Spencer Tracy in Cass Timberlane, and with Wallace Beery in The Mighty McGurk (both 1947). He concluded his MGM period acting in two Clark Gable films, Homecoming and Command Decision (both 1948).

Mitchell moved to Columbia Pictures and had his first movie-star role as a prizefighter in the film noir Leather Gloves (1948). He appeared as a deep-sea diver in Smuggler's Gold (1951). He also starred in Monogram Pictures' Flight To Mars (1951) .

Mitchell originated the role of Happy Loman in Arthur Miller's Death of a Salesman (1949) on Broadway. His performance earned him a 1949 Theatre World Award. After its closing, he appeared again in the Broadway production of Southern Exposure (1950). Mitchell reprised the role of Happy Loman in the 1951 film adaptation released by Columbia Pictures.

Mitchell was contracted with 20th Century-Fox, where he had a prolific career in such films as Les Misérables (1952) as Marius, and in the comedy How to Marry a Millionaire (1953), in which he portrayed a wealthy man attempting to romance a single woman (played by Lauren Bacall).

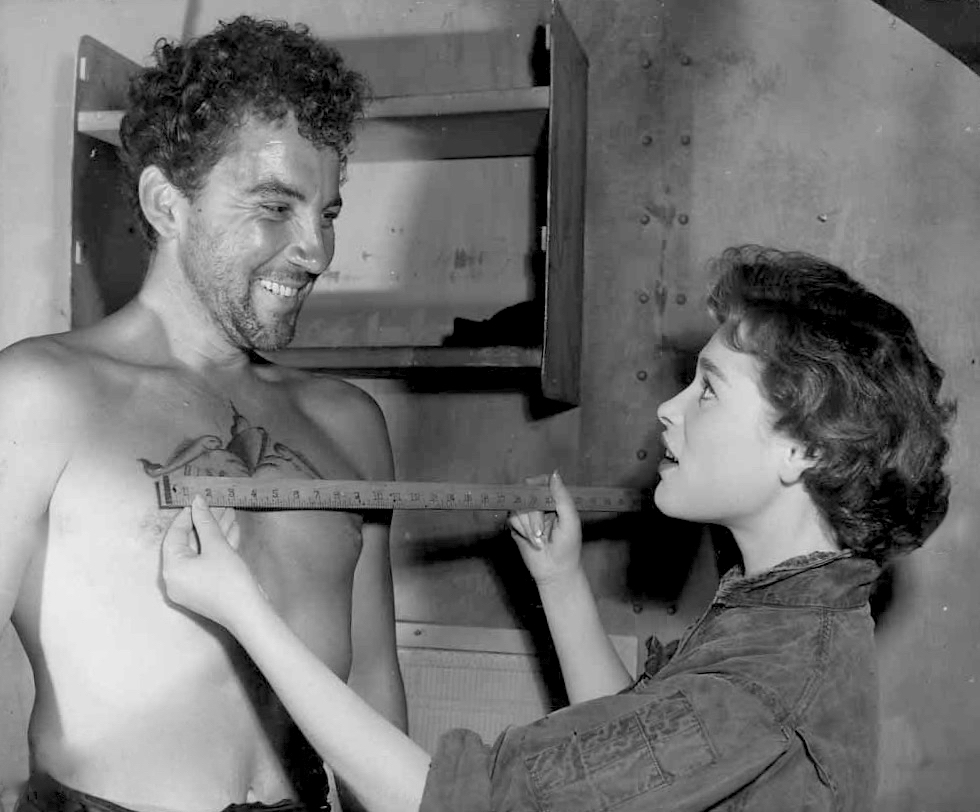
Mitchell and Bella Darvi on the set of Hell and High Water (1954)

He then appeared alongside Gary Cooper, Susan Hayward, and Richard Widmark in the drama Garden of Evil (1954), followed by a supporting role in Samuel Fuller's Cold War drama Hell and High Water (1954). He subsequently co-starred with Marlon Brando in Désirée (1954); with Gable and Jane Russell in the Western The Tall Men (1955); and the film version of the stage musical Carousel (1956). Mitchell was lent back to MGM to co-star with Doris Day and James Cagney in the musical drama Love Me or Leave Me (1955). Mitchell co-starred with Joanne Woodward and Sheree North in the drama No Down Payment (1957).

=== Television career ===
Mitchell moved from movies to television in the 1950s, saying he no longer cared for then current film work. "Thank God I worked with the great ones: Gable, Cooper, Power. The respect, mystique, and imagination are gone from the movies. The old movies were better. Today they're junk".

Mitchell starred in an unsold 1959 television pilot called I Am a Lawyer. Also in 1959 he starred in the title role on S2 E30 of Wagon Train "The Duke LeMay Story". He had the lead as John Lackland in the 1961 syndicated adventure series The Beachcomber.

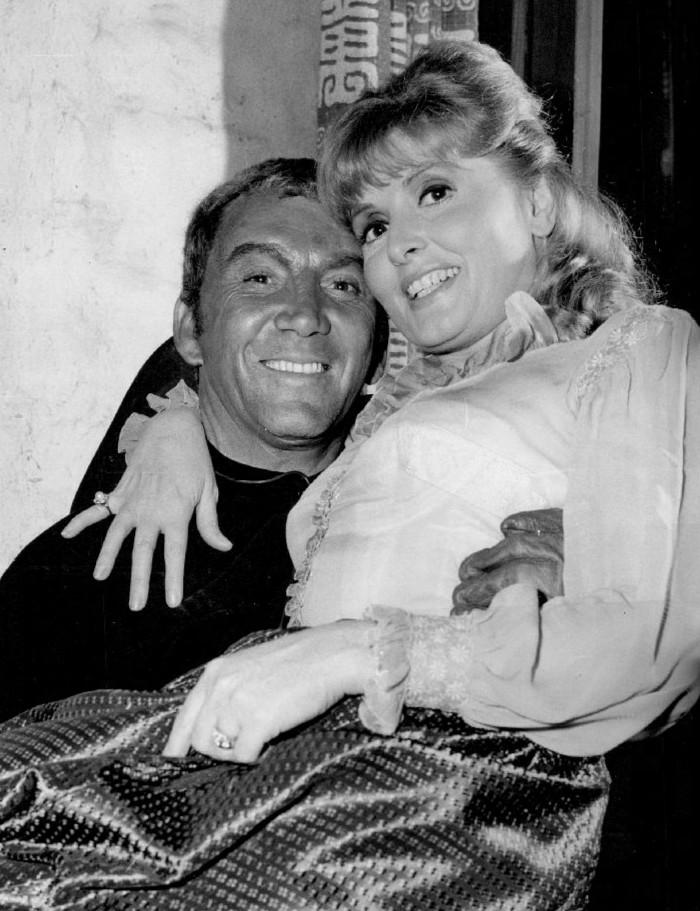
Mitchell with Patricia Barry in The High Chaparral

=== The High Chaparral ===
Mitchell, who did not drink, achieved success on television starring as the former Confederate soldier, drunkard cowhand Buck Cannon in the NBC Western series, The High Chaparral which aired from 1967 to 1971.

Mitchell praised the series, saying, "I firmly believe that our show is the best of all the Westerns. There is nothing like it. It's not hip. I'm sick of hip – it's old style. The realism is wonderful. It's like it was. On location, where we do most of our shooting, I've walked where Cochise actually walked the land. I've talked to the people, some of the real pioneers of the West. For me, this series is not just a series, it's one long story".

During the show's production, Mitchell was reportedly "an outspoken, hard-headed guy who has fought with all his High Chaparral colleagues and who manages to alienate just about everybody who runs into him, from fans to producers". Mitchell agreed, saying, "Everybody on the show hates me, except (producer) David Dortort. Maybe hate is too strong a word. But I think they all respect the truth of what I say".

=== Exploitation film career ===
Throughout the 1960s, Mitchell starred in numerous exploitation films, including Italian sword and sandal, horror, fantasy, and thriller films, several of which were directed by Mario Bava. Among his collaborations with Bava were the action film Erik the Conqueror (1961), playing a Viking; Blood and Black Lace (1964), in which he portrayed the owner of a fashion house plagued by a series of brutal murders; and as a knife-throwing Viking warrior in Knives of the Avenger (1966). He also appeared in Westerns, such as Minnesota Clay (1964) and Ride in the Whirlwind (1966).

In later years, Mitchell appeared in villainous roles as a sheriff-turned-outlaw in Hombre (1967), a bandit in Buck and the Preacher (1972), and a Ku Klux Klan racist in The Klansman (1974). Beginning in 1970, he intermittently filmed The Other Side of the Wind with director Orson Welles, a project that was unreleased until 2018, 24 years after his death. In 1975–1976, he portrayed Jeremiah Worth in the Swiss Family Robinson TV series, and had a supporting role opposite Leo Fong in the Filipino film Enforcer from Death Row (1976).

Mitchell was subsequently featured on an episode of Bonanza and ABC's S.W.A.T.. He guest-starred on the "Landslide" episode of Movin' On in 1975. He appeared on Gene Evans's short-lived Spencer's Pilots on CBS in 1976. Mitchell also had roles in horror films and in many exploitation films, such as The Toolbox Murders (1978), the creature feature The Swarm (1978), the slasher film The Demon (1979), and the slasher film Silent Scream (1980). He appeared again on Broadway in the 1978 production of The November People, and the same year starred as Henry Gordon in the television miniseries adaptation of Black Beauty.

=== Later work ===
Late in his career, Mitchell played a gangster for laughs in My Favorite Year (1982), a drunken ship captain in the Filipino martial-arts horror-comedy Raw Force (1982), and a police detective in the 1983 pornographic film Dixie Ray, Hollywood Star. He had a supporting role in the anthology horror films Night Train to Terror (1985) and From a Whisper to a Scream (1987), as well as roles portraying right-wing General Edwin A. Walker in Prince Jack (1985), and as Captain Alex Jansen in Space Mutiny, a 1988 South African science-fiction film that appeared as an "Experiment" in episode 820 of Mystery Science Theater 3000.

In 1984, he had the role of Duke Kovak in Partners in Crime. He also appeared in an episode of Knight Rider, playing the role of criminal Bernie Mitchell.

== Aborted sports career ==
Mitchell pitched for the Culver City-Palms semiprofessional baseball team when his acting schedule allowed.

In 1947, a scout for the Detroit Tigers said Mitchell had "definite major-league possibilities" and offered him a contract to sign on as a pitcher for the Tigers. Mitchell told the scout, "Gee, I certainly appreciate the offer, but I'm already under contract". When asked to whom, Mitchell answered "To MGM. I'm getting $ 20,000 a year as an actor." (equivalent to $288,376 in 2025). Mitchell said he kept the unsigned contract throughout his life.

On August 18, 1947, he pitched four hitless innings as a member of the Pacific Coast League Hollywood Stars against the Los Angeles Angels during the 1947 Damon Runyon Cancer Fund game held in Hollywood, Los Angeles. The Stars won 4–3. Mitchell was dismayed that newspaper articles about the game referred to him as a "bit player". He said, "If they had only referred to me as an actor. That one remark took away all of the enjoyment I had in the game".

Mitchell did sign with the Las Vegas Wranglers as a pitcher on August 31, 1947. Mitchell pitched one game throwing curveballs. Unfortunately, in one inning, his pitching allowed the opposing Ontario Orioles 13 runs, 11 hits, and five walks. The Wranglers canceled Mitchell's next scheduled appearance, quickly ending his semiprofessional career.

== Personal life ==
On August 17, 1940, Mitchell married Johanna Mendel in Lancaster, New Hampshire. Mendel's father, Fred Mendel, had founded Intercontinental Packers in Saskatoon, Saskatchewan. The Mitchells' four children held dual US/Canadian citizenship. Daughter Camille Mitchell and son Charles (later known as Cameron Mitchell Jr.) are both actors. Son Michael Fredrick "Fred" Mitchell, became president of Intercontinental Packers. Now known as Mitchell's Gourmet Foods, the company is owned by Maple Leaf Foods.

His first wife, Johanna filed a lawsuit alleging cruelty, and sought over $2,000 a month in financial support. Mitchell married Lissa Jacobs Gertz in June 1957. Mitchell and Gertz had three children: Kate, Jake, and Jono.

In February 1974, Mitchell entered his second bankruptcy, with $2.4 million in debts contrasted against $26 in two bank accounts. He told Associated Press writer Bob Thomas: "The reasons are the same as have happened to other actors over the years. Stupid, bad investments. Parasites who live off you. Too much trust in people who handle your money".

On May 9, 1973, Mitchell married Margaret Brock Johnson Mozingo, whom he met when he was in Clemson, South Carolina, making The Midnight Man; their marriage took place in Puerto Rico. In November 1976, his wife applied to a civil court to annul the marriage on the grounds of bigamy. Arguing she was the victim of deception, she said she married her husband before his divorce from Gertz was finalized on February 23, 1974. Mitchell's marriage to Mozingo was formally annulled. In March 1976, Gertz had sued Mozingo for $53,000, a sum she claimed Mitchell and Mozingo agreed to pay her as a divorce settlement.

== Death ==
Mitchell died of lung cancer on July 6, 1994, in Pacific Palisades, California, at age 75. He is buried in Desert Memorial Park in Cathedral City, California.

== Accolades ==
- 1949: Theatre World Award – Actor – Death of a Salesman
- 1956: Golden Laurel Award – Top Male Character Performance – Love Me or Leave Me
- 1957: BAMBI Award – Best Actor - International – Monkey on My Back
- 1970: BAMBI Award – Best TV Series - International – The High Chaparral (Shared with co-stars: Linda Cristal · Henry Darrow · Leif Erickson · Mark Slade)

== Sources ==
- Aaker, Everett (2017). Television Western Players, 1960–1975: A Biographical Dictionary. Jefferson, North Carolina: McFarland. ISBN 978-1-476-62856-1.
- Blottner, Gene (2015). Columbia Noir: A Complete Filmography, 1940-1962. Jefferson, North Carolina: McFarland. ISBN 978-0-786-47014-3.
- Brooks, Patricia; Brooks, Jonathan (2006). "Chapter 8: East L.A. and the Desert". Laid to Rest in California: a Guide to the Cemeteries and Grave Sites of the Rich and Famous. Guilford, Connecticut: Globe Pequot Press. ISBN 978-0762741014.
- Dombrowski, Lisa (2015). The Films of Samuel Fuller: If You Die, I'll Kill You. Middletown, Connecticut: Wesleyan University Press. ISBN 978-0-819-57610-1.
- Meyers, Jeffrey (2012). The Genius and the Goddess: Arthur Miller and Marilyn Monroe. Champaign, Illinois: University of Illinois Press. ISBN 978-0-252-07854-5.
- Terrace, Vincent (2011). Encyclopedia of Television Shows, 1925 through 2010 (2nd ed.). Jefferson, North Carolina: McFarland & Company, Inc., Publishers. ISBN 978-0-7864-6477-7.
- Tombs, Pete (1998). Mondo Macabro: Weird and Wonderful Cinema Around the World. New York: Macmillan. ISBN 978-0-312-18748-4.
- Willis, John; Monush, Barry, eds. (2000). Comprehensive Pictorial and Statistical Record of the 1994 Movie Season. Milwaukee, Wisconsin: Hal Leonard Corporation. ISBN 978-1-557-83233-7.
