= Richard Norton (actor) =

Australian martial artist, actor and stuntman (1950–2025)

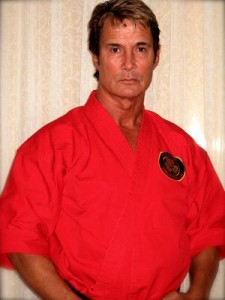
- Norton in 2014
- Born: 6 January 1950; Croydon, Victoria, Australia
- Died: 30 March 2025 (aged 75); Melbourne, Victoria, Australia
- Occupations: Actor; martial artist; bodyguard; security consultant; stunt performer; fight choreographer
- Years active: 1980–2025
- Spouse: Judy Green (m. 1993)
- Martial arts career
- Style: Zen Do Kai; Brazilian Jiu-Jitsu; Gōjū-ryū karate; Kickboxing; Chun Kuk Do
- Teachers: Bob Jones; Tino Ceberano; Chuck Norris; Benny Urquidez; Pete Cunningham
- Rank: Sōke (10th dan black belt) in Zen Do Kai, Shihan (5th dan black belt) in Gōjū-ryū, 6th degree black belt in BJJ, 8th dan black belt in Chun Kuk Do, Level 6 in Ukidokan Kickboxing

Other information
- Website: richardnortonbjj.com

Richard Norton (6 January 1950 – 30 March 2025) was an Australian martial artist, actor, stunt performer, stunt coordinator, security consultant and fight choreographer. He held a 5th dan black belt in Gōjū-ryū karate, a 6th dan black belt in Brazilian Jiu-Jitsu, an 8th dan black belt in Chun Kuk Do, and a Level 6 ranking in American Kickboxing.

After high school, Norton worked as a bodyguard in the entertainment business before pursuing an acting career. His first movie screen appearance was in the 1980 Chuck Norris film The Octagon, and he worked on over 80 feature films and television programs. He appeared in a number of martial arts films, facing off against stars such as Jackie Chan, Sammo Hung, Yasuaki Kurata, Benny Urquidez, Don Wilson and Cynthia Rothrock, and worked as fight choreographer in others.

With fellow karateka Bob Jones, Norton was the co-creator of Zen Do Kai, a hybrid self-defence martial art intended for the security industry. He was also the head of Richard Norton BJJ.

== Early life and training ==
Norton was born in Croydon, a suburb of Melbourne, Australia, on 6 January 1950.

He began studying Judo at the age of 11, and later took up Gōjū-ryū karate, earning his black belt at the age of 17. In 1970, he was hired by Bob Jones as the chief instructor for his Melbourne dojo, which later developed into Zen Do Kai, while also working as a security guard.

He cross-trained in various arts including Brazilian jiu-jitsu (under the Machado brothers), Chun Kuk Do (under Chuck Norris) and Ukidokan Kickboxing (under Pete Cunningham and Benny Urquidez), as well as Aikido, Judo, Muay Thai and Kobudo.

He trained with Tino Ceberano, Tadashi Yamashita, Fumio Demura, Bill 'Superfoot' Wallace, Jean-Jacques Machado and Chuck Norris.

== Career ==
Norton entered the entertainment industry as a personal bodyguard for The Rolling Stones, Linda Ronstadt, James Taylor, David Bowie, ABBA, John Belushi, Fleetwood Mac and Stevie Nicks. Norton appeared as a bodyguard in the ABBA: The Movie in 1977, as they toured Australia.

Norton was on the cover (as well as featured in editorials) of martial arts magazines including Black Belt twice (published since 1987), Australasian Fighting Arts in 1983 (published 1974 to 1998), Blitz Magazine, Impact (published 1992 to 2010) with Cynthia Rothrock in 1993, and with Jackie Chan in 1997, Inside Kung Fu, MA Training (published 1988 to 2000), and Martial Arts & Combat Sports (published 1999 to 2002). In 2014 Norton was inducted into the Australasian Martial Arts Hall of Fame.

He also was the head instructor of the Richard Norton Brazilian Jiu-Jitsu organisation.

=== Film ===
Norton's first movie screen appearance was in the 1980 Chuck Norris film The Octagon. He became known for his appearances in Hong Kong action films. His Hong Kong credits include The Magic Crystal, Twinkle Twinkle Lucky Stars, City Hunter (a live-action remake of the manga), Millionaire's Express, and Mr. Nice Guy. A signature catchphrase of Norton's characters is "Painful?", usually asked after striking a decisive blow. The most comical example is in Twinkle, Twinkle Lucky Stars, where he faces Sammo Hung and in the movie Millionaire's Express against Yasuaki Kurata.

Over his career, Norton faced off with many top martial arts action stars. He appeared with Jackie Chan in three films, including City Hunter; with Benny "the Jet" Urquidez (in Kick Fighter); Don "The Dragon" Wilson (in CyberTracker); and Cynthia Rothrock (in China O'Brien and Lady Dragon).

Norton was the fight coordinator on Walker, Texas Ranger in 1993, and on the 2007 film The Condemned (starring "Stone Cold" Steve Austin and Vinnie Jones), doubling for Jones.

He was a minor (sometimes uncredited) character in several episodes (at least eight), and had a starring role as villainous businessman Frank Scanlon in The Avenging Angel; he was in the two-part finale The Final Show/Down as Jonas Graves, part of Emile Lavocat's (Marshall R. Teague) criminal gang (he also appears in the "flashback" scenes illustrating the end of the Hayes Cooper legend, as part of Mills "Moon" Lavocat's (also Marshall R. Teague) desperado gang).

In August 2010, Norton appeared at Berlin Movie Con, a convention of martial arts where he was joined by ten other stars of martial arts cinema in a two-day show. It was staged in the Universal Hall in Berlin, Germany. Among his fellow stars were Cynthia Rothrock, Don "The Dragon" Wilson and Conan Lee.

== Martial arts experience ==
Norton had trained in many aspects of martial arts, including Judo, Karate, Brazilian Jiu-Jitsu, Aikido, Thai boxing and several Japanese weapons systems. He used this experience to co-create the hybrid martial art Zen Do Kai with fellow security guard Bob Jones. He had a 5th-Degree Shihan rank Black Belt in Goju Ryu, 8th-Degree Masters rank in Chun Kuk Do (Chuck Norris system), 6th-Degree Black belt in Brazilian Jiu-Jitsu and a 10th-degree Black Belt in Zen Do Kai Karate, an organisation of over 5,000 members. He trained with Tino Ceberano, Tadashi Yamashita, Fumio Demura, Bill 'Superfoot' Wallace, Pete "Sugar Foot" Cunningham, Jean-Jacques Machado and Chuck Norris.

Norton held seminars covering such topics as street defence, martial arts weapons drills, Brazilian Jiu-Jitsu and mixed martial arts. In September 2007, Norton released a two-disc DVD set on Black Belt Digital Video called Black Belt training Complexes. The DVDs show Norton executing fast and accurate examples of his skill, and some additional seminar footage is also included. They focus on the development of speed, power and continuity of movement, with explanations of the principles.

== Personal life and death ==
Richard Norton married Australian actress Judy Green in 1993.

Norton died on 30 March 2025 in Melbourne. He was 75. It was later revealed that he had died after injecting unapproved peptides prescribed to him by a doctor, at twice the prescribed dose.

== Filmography ==
=== Film ===
- ABBA: The Movie (1977) – as Himself, Bodyguard and fitness trainer (uncredited)
- The Octagon (1980) – Kyo [was also stunt-man]
- Force: Five (1981) – Ezekiel
- Forced Vengeance (1982) – Herb [was also a stunt-man]
- Gymkata (1985) – Zamir [was also a fight choreographer]
- Twinkle, Twinkle Lucky Stars (1985) – Caucasian Assassin
- American Ninja (1985) – MP (uncredited) [was also stunt-man]
- Equalizer 2000 (1986) – Slade
- Future Hunters (1986) – Matthew
- Millionaire's Express – (1986) – Bandit
- Magic Crystal (1987) – Karov
- Return of the Kickfighter (1987) – Brad Cooper
- The Fighter (1987) – Ryan Travers
- Fight to Win (1987) – Armstrong
- Not Another Mistake (1987) – Richard Straker
- Jungle Assassin (1988)
- Hawkeye (1988)
- Licence to Kill (1989) {007 film, no. 16}
- The Sword of Bushido (1989) – Zac Connors
- Hyper Space (1989) – Thomas Stanton
- The Blood of Heroes (1989) – Bone [also stunt-man]
- Blood Street (1990)
- China O'Brien (1988) – Matt Conroy
- China O'Brien II (1990) – Matt Conroy
- Raiders of the Sun (1992) – Brodie
- Rage and Honor (1992) – Preston Michaels
- Lady Dragon (1992) – Ludwig Hauptman
- Ironheart (1992) – Milverstead
- City Hunter (1993) – Colonel "Big Mac" MacDonald
- Rage and Honor II (1993) – Preston Michaels
- Deathfight (1994) – Jack Dameron
- Direct Hit (1994) – Rogers
- CyberTracker (1994) – Ross
- The Supreme Warrior (1995) – Earth Warlord
- Tough and Deadly (1995) – Agent Norton
- Under the Gun (1995) – Frank Torrence
- For Life or Death (1996)
- Soul of the Avenger (1997) – Sir Xavier
- Strategic Command (1997) – Carlos Gruber
- Mr. Nice Guy (1997) – Giancarlo Luchetti
- Tex Murphy: Overseer (1998) – Big Jim Slade
- Black Thunder (1998) – Rather
- Nautilus (2000) – John Harris
- The Rage Within (2001) – Keller
- Amazons and Gladiators (2001) – Lucius [also stunt coordinator and Second Unit Director]
- Redemption (2002) – Tom 'Snake' Sasso
- Dream Warrior (2003) – Archer [also Second Unit Director]
- Mind Games (2003) – Carter Tallerin
- Road House 2 (2006) – Victor Cross
- Under a Red Moon (2008) – Jonathan Dunn
- Man of Blood (2008) – Lee Francis
- Dead in Love (2009) – Danny's Dad
- Tesla Effect: A Tex Murphy Adventure (2014)
- Mad Max: Fury Road (2015) – The Prime Imperator [also the fight coordinator/stunt performer]
- Suicide Squad (2016) – fight coordinator
- The Suicide Squad (2021) – fight coordinator
- Rage (2021) – Detective John Bennett
- Furiosa: A Mad Max Saga (2024) – The Prime Imperator [also the fight choreographer/fight coordinator]
- Black Creek (2024) – Damien Sinclair

=== Television ===
Richard Norton' television credits
Year	Title	Role	Notes
1992	Kung Fu: The Legend Continues	—N/a	Television film
1993–2001	Walker, Texas Ranger	Various roles Incl. Frank Scanlon Jonas Graves Desperado, Drug Dealer #3 Mercenary #1	Martial arts coordinator In at least 3 episodes
1997–1998	The New Adventures of Robin Hood	Lord Chilton Outlaw Trueco Rossamar	Also the stunt coordinator 3 episodes
2013	Spartacus	Legendary gladiator Hilarus and 'personal trainer' of sorts, to Crassus	Episode: "Enemies of Rome"
