= Under the Gun (1995 film) =

- Directed by: Matthew George
- Written by: Matthew George
- Produced by: Paul Currie
- Starring: Richard Norton; Kathy Long; Jane Badler
- Edited by: Gary Woodyard
- Production company: Village Pictures
- Distributed by: Palace (video)
- Release date: 1995
- Running time: 93 mins
- Countries: Australia; United States
- Language: English

Under the Gun is a 1995 Australian-American action film directed by Matthew George and starring Richard Norton and Kathy Long. The film was released direct to home video in 1995.

It was the directorial debut of George.

== Plot ==
Frank Torrance is a former ice hockey star turned night club owner who wants to sell out and catch the next plane out of town but is heavily in debt.

== Cast ==
- Richard Norton as Frank Torrence
- Kathy Long as Lisa Kruse
- Jane Badler as Sandy Torrence
- Peter Lindsay as Harry Hardaway
- Robert Bruce as Detective Dexter
- David Serafin as Tom Crenshaw
- Ron Vreeken as Kato
- Tino Ceberano as Lau
- Adam Haddrick as Minder
- Sam Greco as Dave 'The Stealth Bomha'
- Roland Dantes as Lee
- Eng Aun Khor as Linpow
- Rachel Lucas as Louise
- Alberto Villa as Eduardo Carobelli
- Alan King as Carl Carobelli
- Judy Green as Call Girl
- Michael Saunders as Hank
- Nicky Buckley as Jane

== Production ==
The film was independently financed with Imperial Entertainment acquiring all worldwide rights except Australia and North America. It was financed by Tom Kuhn and Fred Weintraub and was mostly shot at a deserted power station next to the Yarra River in Richmond, Melbourne.
