= Guardian Angel (1994 film) =

1994 film by Richard Munchkin

- Original poster art
- Directed by: Richard W. Munchkin
- Written by: Jacobsen Hart
- Produced by: Richard Pepin; Joseph Merhi
- Starring: Cynthia Rothrock; Daniel McVicar; Lydie Denier; Marshall R. Teague
- Cinematography: Garett Griffin
- Edited by: John E. Hensel
- Music by: Bruce Hanifan
- Production company: PM Entertainment Group
- Distributed by: Imperial Entertainment
- Release date: November 20, 1994 (U.S.)
- Running time: 96 minutes
- Country: United States
- Language: English

Guardian Angel is a 1994 American action film directed by Richard W. Munchkin, starring Cynthia Rothrock, Lydie Denier, Daniel McVicar and Marshall R. Teague. Rothrock plays a cop-turned-bodyguard on assignment to protect a rich playboy from an unhinged woman, who is both the client's former mistress and the criminal responsible for the death of the heroine's fiancé. Although contemporary reviews were mixed, it is better regarded than most of the actress' American output.

== Cast ==
- Cynthia Rothrock as McKay
- Daniel McVicar as Hobbs
- Lydie Denier as Nina
- Marshall R. Teague as Nick
- Ken McLeod as Ostendorf
- John O'Leary as Clayton
- Anna Dalva as Goddard
- Robert Miano as David
- Brian Brophy as "Slick"
- Matthew Walker as "Lippy"
- Art Camacho as Jimmy Lee
- Dan Doherty as Issac

== Production ==
=== Development and filming ===
Guardian Angel was Rothrock's first and only collaboration with action specialists PM Entertainment. The company was typically reluctant to hire women in leading roles due to their limited track record in the genre, but gave her a chance based on the performance of some of her movies. Filming took place in the Los Angeles agglomeration between July 26 and September 3, 1993. The fictional "Dick's Bar", where Rothrock's character brawls with a group of thugs, was represented by the Yukon Belle in Thousand Oaks, once a legitimate criminal hangout that fell victim to the area's gentrification a few years after filming.

=== Stunts ===
Rothrock's frequent screen partner Richard Norton contributed to fight choreography. A Mexican performer, hired by the production despite his limited credentials, was grazed by Rothrock during filming, and tried to extort them $250,000 due to an allegedly broken nose. Rothrock denied causing him any lasting damage, and the man quickly lowered his demands to a fraction of the initial amount. Co-star Lydie Denier was inspired to take kickboxing classes after witnessing Rothrock in action. The film marked the debut of veteran stuntwoman Anita Hart, who was introduced to PM stunt coordinator Cole McKay by a mutual friend. Playing the killer maid, she got her high fall on the first take and went on to become a PM regular herself. Although Rothrock performed her fight scenes, some of PM's trademark setpieces required the use of a stunt double, such as the horse chase. Reflecting the company's hectic shoots, the wig worn by the rider visibly slipped during the scene but it could not be redone, and the mishap had to be worked around in post-production. The character of Goddard, a fellow cop who helps the heroine commandeer the Cigarette Lady speedboat for the final chase, was played by its real-life owner and competitive driver Anna Dalva.

== Release ==
=== Theatrical ===
The film received a theatrical release in some international markets, such as Japan, where it opened through HRS Funai on December 9, 1994.

=== Home media ===
In the U.S., Guardian Angel was released on VHS by Imperial Entertainment on November 23, 1994. It reached Australia the same month via 21st Century Pictures, under the title Beyond Justice, and the U.K. the previous July through Guild Home Video. The film received a domestic DVD re-issue on May 4, 2004, from Kreative Digital Entertainment via Universal Music & Video Distribution, as part of a slate of PM Entertainment releases.

== Reception ==
Guardian Angel received mixed reviews from mainstream publications. TV Guide criticized the inclusion of another ill-fated companion for Rothrock, but noted the novelty of the femme fatale antagonist played by Denier, and ultimately deemed that "it's McVicar's tongue-in-cheek turn as the Robert Wagnerian poor little rich boy that makes Guardian Angel watchable, if hardly a standout." Ballantine Books' Video Movie Guide wrote: "Martial arts expert Cynthia Rothrock is back in this pedestrian effort about an ex-cop out to avenge the deaths of her partner and lover. [...] Novelty here is the killer is a woman. Anyone for a good cat fight?"

British reference book Elliot's Guide to Home Entertainment called it "[a] violent actioner that serves merely as an adequate showcase for Rothrock’s fighting skills." Pat Gillespie of Australian newspaper The Age described Rothrock as "stilted but likeable". However, he found that the film's humorous brand of feminism was "short circuited by gratuitous focus on boorish fight scenes", which amounted to little more than "cheap thrills".
