= Sandra Weintraub =

American soap opera writer and producer

- Occupation(s): American soap opera writer and producer
- Known for: The Young and the Restless writing
- Father: Fred Weintraub
- Website: https://www.imdb.com/name/nm0738083/bio/

Sandra Weintraub Roland is an American soap opera writer and producer. She is most notable for her writing on CBS's The Young and the Restless, which she has written in different positions since 1998. In the 1970s she was also notable for her close relationship with Martin Scorsese. They lived together for four years during which time she worked on Scorsese's Alice Doesn't Live Here Anymore as associate producer, and also served in other production capacities on Taxi Driver and Mean Streets. In addition, she appeared briefly, and uncredited, in the latter film. Raised in New York City, she is one of four children of former Warner Bros. production executive Fred Weintraub.

== Filmography ==
=== Films ===
Title	Year	Director	Writer	Producer	Notes
Alice Doesn't Live Here Anymore	1974	No	No	Associate	
Tom Horn	1980	No	No	Associate	
High Road to China	1983	No	Yes	No	
Out of Control	1985	No	Yes	No	
The Princess Academy	1987	No	Yes	Yes	
The Women's Club	1987	Yes	Yes	No	Directorial debut
China O'Brien	1990	No	Story	Yes	
China O'Brien II	1990	No	No	Yes	Direct-to-video
The Best of the Martial Arts Films	1990	Yes	Yes	No	Documentary film
Born to Ride	1991	No	No	Yes	
Gypsy Eyes	1992	No	No	Yes	

Other credits
Title	Year	Credited as	Director
Mean Streets	1973	Pre-production and post-production coordinator	Martin Scorsese
Taxi Driver	1976	Creative consultant	Martin Scorsese

=== Television ===
Title	Year	Writer	Producer	Notes
Chips, the War Dog	1990	Story	Yes	Television film
The New Adventures of Robin Hood	1997-1998	Yes	Supervising	19 episodes, also creator
La Femme Musketeer	2004	Yes	No	Miniseries (2 episodes)
The Young and the Restless	2008-2012	Yes	No	250 episodes

== Awards ==
- Daytime Emmy Award, Win, 2006, Best Writing, The Young and The Restless
- Writers Guild of America Award, Win, 2006 season, The Young and The Restless
