= China O'Brien =

1990 film by Robert Clouse

- Directed by: Robert Clouse
- Screenplay by: Robert Clouse
- Story by: Sandra Weintraub
- Produced by: Fred Weintraub; Sandra Weintraub
- Starring: Cynthia Rothrock; Richard Norton; Doug Wright; Nijel; Arturo Rivera
- Cinematography: Kent L. Wakeford
- Edited by: Mark Harrah
- Music by: David Wheatley; Paul Antonelli
- Distributed by: Studio / Sterling; Golden Harvest; Media Asia Group
- Release dates: February 1990 (United Kingdom); 1991 (United States)
- Running time: 86 minutes
- Language: English

China O'Brien is a 1990 martial arts film produced by Golden Harvest studios and starring actress and martial artist Cynthia Rothrock with co-stars Richard Norton and Keith Cooke. The film was directed by Robert Clouse, the fight choreography was by Nijel Binns, and it was executive produced by Raymond Chow. Rothrock plays a former cop who runs for sheriff after her father, the previous sheriff, is killed.

== Plot ==
Police officer China O'Brien is a good cop who teaches martial arts class to her fellow officers. After an altercation with a gang that leads to the accidental death of a young boy, China resigns from the force, and returns to her hometown of Beaver Creek, Utah. On her way into town she runs into her former high school sweetheart Matt Conroy. Searching for her father, she goes to the Beaver Creek Inn and encounters a hostile situation, as her father has just arrested one of the men there. Her father, John O'Brien, is the town sheriff. China finally catches up with him back at the station. John is losing control of the town to local crime boss Edwin Sommers, who controls corrupt deputy Marty Lickner and corrupt local judge Harry Godar. When John and honest deputy Ross Tyler are killed by car bombs that were planted by Sommers's henchmen, there is an emergency election to elect a new sheriff.

Matt tells China that she has a lot of support from the townspeople, so she decides to run for sheriff against Lickner. At the same time, she starts cleaning up the town with the help of Matt and a Native American biker named Dakota, whose mother was murdered by Sommers. China wins the election, and then Maria, who had been her father's housekeeper up until his death, is murdered by Sommers' men in a drive-by shooting during the victory celebration. China has to force Judge Godar to swear her in as the new sheriff. China deputizes Matt and Dakota, and they set out to free Beaver Creek from Sommers' stranglehold.

First, they bulldoze a house that Sommers was using to distribute drugs. Then, during an altercation at the Beaver Creek Inn, Dakota questions Lickner about his mother, and Lickner admits Sommers was responsible for his mother's death. Dakota takes Lickner's gun and gets on his motorcycle to Sommers's home. China realises Dakota intends to confront Sommers, and so she and Matt pursue Dakota. Dakota finds Sommers at the stables and points the gun at him. However, he restrains himself and when China and Matt arrive, Sommers is still alive. Matt handcuffs himself to Sommers but as they leave the stable, a woman that Sommers had locked up and beaten fires at Sommers and kills him. The next day, China asks Dakota what he will do next. Dakota says he will stay for the trial and China tells him she could use a man like him. Dakota laughs off being a cop to which Matt replies that they can discuss it over a beer.

== Cast ==
- Cynthia Rothrock as Officer Lori "China" O'Brien
- Richard Norton as Matt Conroy
- Keith Cooke as Dakota
- Patrick Adamson as Deputy Marty Lickner
- David Blackwell as Sheriff John O'Brien
- Chad Walker as Deputy Ross Tyler
- Stanton Davis as Barlow
- Robert Tiller as Owens
- Lainie Watts as Patty
- Steven Kerby as Sommers
- Frank Magner as Jake Karns
- Wil Hazlett as Judge Harry Godar
- Gae Cowley as Maria
- Doug Wright as "Termite"
- Bubba Reeves as Ballard
- Nijel Binns as "Jonsey" Jones

== Production ==
Parts of the film were shot in Park City, Utah.

After a career in Hong Kong, Golden Harvest worked to raise Rothrock's profile in her native America, and she was cast in China O'Brien. Film scholar Rikke Schubart says the producers paired her with Richard Norton, who plays her former highschool boyfriend, and made her the daughter of a slain cop to make her more feminine and seem less threatening. Production halted temporarily when Rothrock had to fly back to Hong Kong to reshoot the ending scene of Righting Wrongs after the original cut was met with a negative reception in Taiwan.

Early in her career, Tori Amos recorded a song "Distant Storm" that can be heard only by viewing the original film. Amos did not want to be credited under her real name and created a fake band, Tess Makes Good, to be credited.

== Release ==
China O'Brien was released direct-to-video in the United States in 1990.

== Reception ==
Variety called it "an okay showcase" for Rothrock.

== Sequel ==
China O'Brien II was released in 1990, with the same cast and crew.

== Bibliography ==
- Schubart, Rikke (2007). Super Bitches and Action Babes: The Female Hero in Popular Cinema, 1970-2006. McFarland & Company. ISBN 9780786429240.
