= Andrew J. Lederer =

American actor

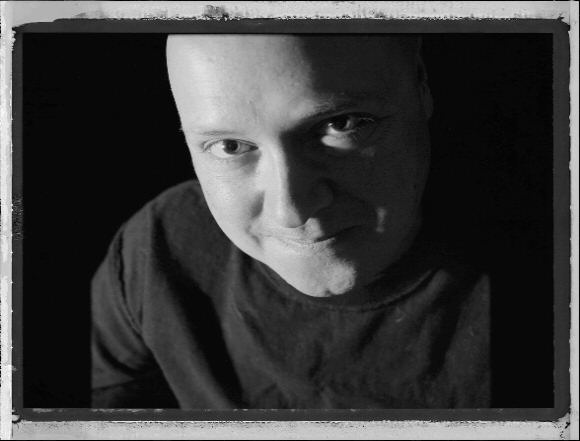
Andrew J. Lederer in 2006

Andrew J. Lederer is a New York-based comedian who has also starred in low-budget movies and worked in writing and production.

== Early life ==
Growing up in New York City, Andrew appeared as a vocal soloist with the Brooklyn Borough-Wide Chorus, both in live performance and on CBS-TV. He became a comedian as a teenager and acted in movies and television, including Family Ties, The Facts of Life, and Fame plus starring roles in the movies Out of Control and Body Count (which was nominated for an International Fantasy Film Award) plus an excised scene - later restored on DVD - in This is Spinal Tap. Later, he became an entertainment journalist, working as a writer and/or editor for Film Threat Magazine, Wild Cartoon Kingdom, Sci-Fi Universe, and National Enquirer. (He returned to journalism in 2008 and 2009 with a series of articles for the newspaper The Scotsman.) At present, he blogs regularly for The Huffington Post.

== Career ==
Andrew wrote a substantial portion of the famous Disney/McDonald's Trivia Challenge (which was so hard it was reported on in the major newsweeklies and caused the overworked library of the Academy of Motion Picture Arts and Sciences to suspend its information line for the duration of the contest). His original screenplay, Won't Fade Out, was given its own chapter in the book The 50 Greatest Movies Never Made (St. Martin’s Press, 1999), alongside unfinished efforts by the likes of Stanley Kubrick, Billy Wilder, and Alfred Hitchcock.

With Dave Feinman, Andrew created CWA, a semi-cooperative management company that represented many of the better Los Angeles comedians for acting work during the late 1990s.

Andrew was a prominent "alternative" comedian, as that term was understood in the U.S. at the turn of the millennium. His long-running The Second Show and Eugene Mirman and Bobby Tisdale's Invite Them Up were the first comedy shows at Rififi/Cinema Classics, one of alternative or indie comedy's most important New York venues. His one-person shows, Petula Clark's Greatest Hits, Bridge-Burner, and Me and Hitler were all presented as part of the Edinburgh Festival Fringe. In 2003, he made a high-profile return to singing as part of the Loser's Lounge Tribute to the Bee Gees, which was followed by two New York-area solo shows. In 2007, Andrew was a consultant for a new Fringe venue, The Green Room. His 2006-2008 blog was featured on the UK's Chortle comedy website. Andrew's most famous role was as Frank, the editor of ASS Magazine in the television series The Adventures of Electra Elf (2004-2008).

== Style ==
Lederer's performance style has increasingly tended toward storytelling rather than a recitation of jokes or more standard comic observations. His one-time roommate, Marc Price, has called him the "father of alternative comedy" (as that term was understood in the United States) but, as Lederer points out, this could only be true if any of the major practitioners had actually been influenced by him, which they probably have not.

== Influence ==
Lederer has often worked in the background, privately providing material for other performers and writers. He advised and contributed to animation and film histories by Jerry Beck and others. He wrote sequences performed by comedian Jackie Diamond (Michael Rosenberg) on Fox TV's Comic Strip Live, and consulted for Marc Price on CBS TV's The Midnight Hour. As a consultant to Will Ryan, he was a key player in some of the more recent attempts to popularize the animated character Elmo Aardvark.

He suggested comedian Harris Peet for the role of Muddy Mudskipper on The Ren and Stimpy Show and directed his audition tape. And though Lederer generally "works clean", edgy, underground comic Rick Shapiro (who very much does not) has credited seeing Andrew with making him realize he could talk about what he wanted to on stage and not be limited by convention.

Lederer was briefly mentored by comedian Jeff Garlin at around the time Garlin was co-creating Curb Your Enthusiasm. He was the only regular performer, aside from Garlin himself, on Garlin's live, weekly comedy show in the spring of 1998 and hosted when Garlin could not. Lederer consulted on the rewriting of an abortive sitcom pilot by Garlin and the two glancingly considered a writing collaboration on a possible HBO bio of Milton Berle. Later, Lederer assisted Garlin during the making of a short Jackie Gleason documentary and was one of those asked to offer opinions on the feature, I Want Someone to Eat Cheese With before the completion of its edit.

The burgeoning comedic storytelling scene in the UK was largely inspired by Lederer's Anthology series at the 2005 Edinburgh Festival Fringe. Both Sarah Bennetto's Storytellers' Club and an earlier Amused Moose effort were started by veterans of the Anthology shows. Lederer's 2007 and 2008 London Anthology presentations have been Critic's Choices in both Time Out and the Evening Standard.

== Work as producer ==
Andrew has been producer or co-producer (often with Parker Entertainment) of a number of live productions including many of Scott Blakeman's political comedy shows and the play Lysistrata 100.

He co-produced comedian Ahmed Ahmed's Richard Pryor Award-winning 2004 Edinburgh Festival Fringe show and the Edinburgh run of Rain Pryor's Fried Chicken and Latkes in 2005.

Andrew, with Parker, also produced the musical variety series, The Savage Breast.

== Notable shows and venues ==
Lederer has at various times been a regular performer at New York's fabled Comic Strip, Improvisation, Catch a Rising Star and Caroline's comedy clubs and at Los Angeles' The Comedy Store.

Alternative venues have included New York's Surf Reality, Collective: Unconscious and the Nuyorican Poets Cafe and L.A's Creativity Bookstore.

Recent live credits include Heeb Magazine's storytelling show and The Onion's comedy series, both at Joe's Pub. Also The Rejection Show at Mo Pitkin's, Nick Kroll and John Mulaney's Oh, Hello and Sherry Weaver's Speakeasy Stories .

In the UK, he has appeared on such progressive, live stand-up and variety shows as Robin Ince's Book Club and Spank!.

Andrew has also been active in new media. In 2007, he was the last writer under City Lights Television's auspices of Heavy News and his more or less daily blog has a following in both the U.S. and the United Kingdom.

== List of one-person shows ==
- AJL: Work in Progress (1996)
- Adventures in Clothing (1997)
- Petula Clark's Greatest Hits (2003)
- Bridge-Burner (2004)
- Me and Hitler (2005)
- Anthology (Free!) (2006)
- Every Day I Write the Book (2007)
- I Need Your Love (2008)
- 9/11 (2010)
- Cold Chicken (2011)
- Cold Comfort (2012)
