= Pete Cunningham (kickboxer) =

Canadian martial artist and actor (born 1963)

Peter Cunningham
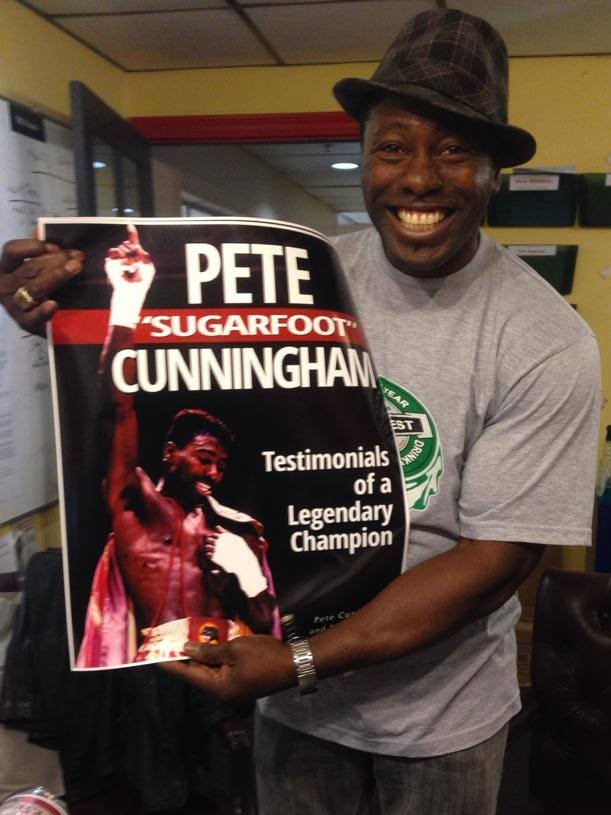
- Cunningham in 2016
- Born: 25 March 1963 (age 63); Port of Spain, Trinidad and Tobago
- Other names: Sugarfoot
- Nationality: Canadian
- Height: 1.73 m (5 ft 8 in)
- Division: Lightweight; Super Lightweight; Junior Welterweight; Welterweight
- Style: Chitō-ryū, Karate, Ukidokan Karate, Boxing, Kickboxing
- Fighting out of: The Jet Center
- Teachers: Robert Supeene Sr., Tom Forstreuter, Ed Couzens, Benny "The Jet" Urquidez
- Rank: 5th degree black belt in Kempo Karate, 2nd degree black belt in Chito-Ryu Karate
- Years active: 18 years

Professional boxing record
- Total: 14
- Wins: 10
- Losses: 4

Kickboxing record
- Total: 53
- Wins: 50
- By knockout: 21
- Losses: 1
- Draws: 2

Other information
- Occupation: Coach at Sugarfoot Kickboxing Coach at Team USA Kickboxing
- Notable students: Richard Norton, Stephen Quadros, Vinc Pichel, Mia St. John, Mikaela Mayer
- Website: sugarfootkickboxing.com
- Boxing record from BoxRec

Peter "Sugarfoot" Cunningham (born 25 March 1963) is a retired Canadian 7-time World Champion Hall of Fame kickboxer, boxer, martial artist, actor and author. Rated by experts as one of the greatest full contact fighters of all time, Cunningham was a superb technician who possessed high fighting I.Q. and lightning speed. He retired from kickboxing in 1996 with a record of 50–1–1, having avenged the only draw of his career but only one defeated Cunningham, the undefeated Richard Sylla at the WKA World Title in Paris. Cunningham's skills in the ring have been praised by many martial arts legends, including Benny "The Jet" Urquidez, Bill "Superfoot" Wallace, Chuck Norris, Dan Inosanto, Rigan Machado, Don "The Dragon" Wilson and many others. Cunningham maintained a high level competition throughout his career as most of his opponents were either current or former champions. In 1998 in San Jose, California, Cunningham was honored as the inaugural inductee in the I.S.K.A. Hall of Fame.

Cunningham's nickname "Sugarfoot" is a combination of the names of two great fighters in boxing and kickboxing that his style most resembled, "Sugar" Ray Leonard and Bill "Superfoot" Wallace, and it was given to him by his peers at his first dojo in Edmonton, Canada while he was still a teenager.

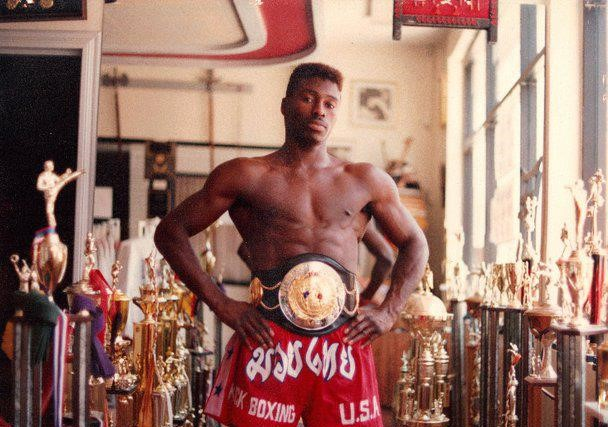
Cunningham in 2016

Cunningham's World Titles included the W.K.A (World Karate Association) Lightweight, Super Lightweight and Junior Walterweight World Titles, the K.I.C.K. (Karate International Council of Kickboxing) Super Lightweight Title, the I.M.F. (International Muay Thai Federation) Junior Welterweight Title, and the I.S.K.A. (International Sport Karate Association) Light Welterweight World Title.

Cunningham is also an actor and has appeared in TV series such as Kung Fu: The Legend Continues and CSI, and in movies such as No Retreat, No Surrender (1986) and The Fighter (2010).

== Biography and career ==
=== Early life ===
Peter D.O. Cunningham was born in Port of Spain, Trinidad and Tobago on 25 March 1963. When he was six years old, his parents divorced, and his mother Rosel left Trinidad and Tobago together with him and his siblings, and moved to the small island of St. Vincent in the West Indies. This is where Cunningham watched Enter the Dragon for the first time as a 10-year old and decided that he is "going to be like Bruce Lee". In 1976, Cunningham's family moved yet again, this time to Edmonton, Alberta, Canada, to start a new life. His mother became a sole bread winner and took care of the children. Cunningham attended St. Marks Junior High School and St. Joseph's High School in Edmonton.

=== Introduction to martial arts ===
Cunningham took his first karate class in February 1978 after being introduced to his first karate dojo and first Sensei Grandmaster Robert Supeene Sr. by junior high school friends. He immediately felt the connection with his Sensei and fell in love with the sport. Seven months later, as an orange belt holder Cunningham participated in his first karate tournament. Along with winning top prize in his own belt division, he was voted "Best Technician" of the tournament, an award typically only won by black belts. This tournament marked the beginning of his career.

=== Fighting career ===
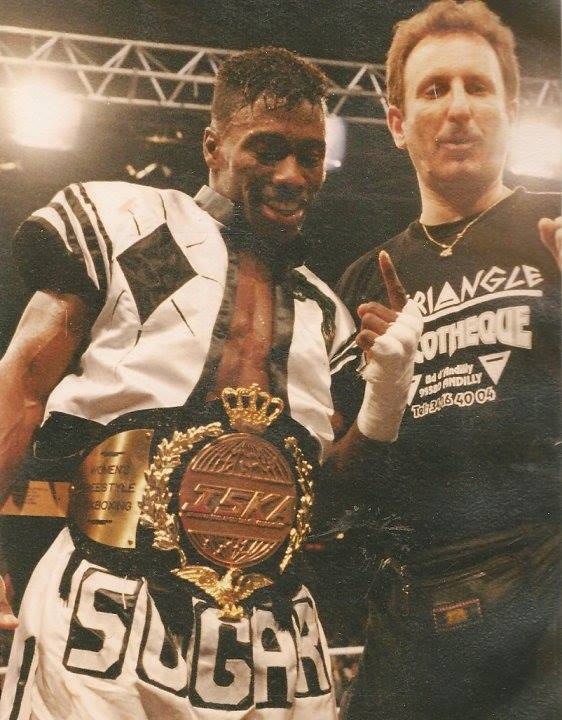
Retirement fight, Dida Diafat 2, 1996.

Cunningham started his amateur kickboxing career in 1980, when he beat Reg Johnson in Calgary, Canada. Later that month, he began taking boxing lessons with Ted James and his son Rocky at the South Side Legion boxing gym in Edmonton.

A few more wins in amateur kickboxing followed, and in January 1981, Cu nninghammet the legendary Benny "The Jet" Urquidez, who was giving a kickboxing seminar in Vancouver, British Columbia, Canada. This is where The Jet told the young fighter "you are going to be a great champion". Around this time, Cunningham had his first professional kickboxing fight where he took on the Canadian Champion Gordy Gong. Cunningham won by a big knock out, a round kick to the head. After the fight, Sensei Rueben Urquidez and Sensei Blinky Rodriguez approached Cunningham and his mother to congratulate him on the big win, and extend an invitation to come and train out of their world class facility in Van Nuys, California, The Jet Center. This was a dream come true for Cunningham and he gladly accepted.

As Cunningham made his move to Los Angeles, he was featured on the undercard of Muhammad Ali's exhibition bout with Edmonton Oiler enforcer Dave Semenko. The event took place at Northlands Coliseum in Edmonton on 12 June 1983. Cunningham defeated his opponent, who was a World Lightweight Champion, and impressed Ali's trainer and cornerman Bundini Brown, who introduced Cunningham to Ali and his family. Ali signed a book for Cunningham's mother, and then suggested to Bundini to invite the young fighter to come and train at the Joe Lewis - Muhammad Ali Gym in Santa Monica.

From that point on, and for the next three years Cunningham trained at both gyms every day, at the Joe Lewis - Muhammad Ali Gym in the morning and at the Jet Center in the afternoon. At this time, Cunningham was fighting professionally in both boxing and kickboxing. He began to gravitate towards kickboxing, and in 1986 after losing a controversial boxing lightweight title fight, decided to focus solely on kickboxing.

=== Acting ===
Cunningham is also an actor with several movies to his credit. In his first role, Cunningham played the lightweight champion fighter Frank Peters and faced off with action star Jean-Claude Van Damme in the 1985 martial arts film No Retreat, No Surrender. He played an assassin in the 1986 Yuen Biao/Corey Yuen film Righting Wrongs. Cunningham guest-starred opposite David Carradine on the Kung Fu: The Legend Continues television series (1993) and worked on big budget feature I Spy (2002), where he doubled Eddie Murphy. Later Cunningham appeared in The Fighter (2010), playing the role of Mike 'Machine Gun' Mungin.

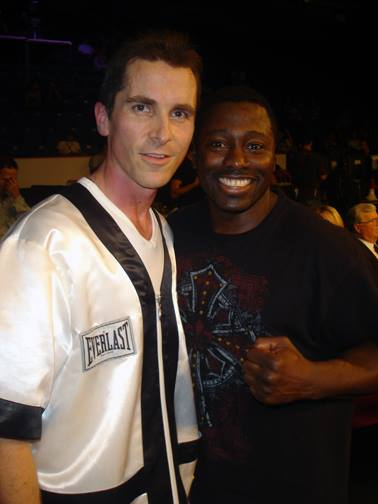
On set of The Fighter, 2010

=== Trainer ===
After retiring from competition, Cunningham continued his career in martial arts as a trainer. He has trained top professional fighters, amateur fighters, as well as teaching classes for general public, including kids and adults. Over the years, he has trained many World Champion amateur and professional fighters in boxing and kickboxing, as well as well-known celebrities.

In 2014, Cunningham was invited to be one of the coaches of the USA Kickboxing Team, and he brought his star pupil German Baltazar along with him. Together, they have led the team to gold medals in several international tournaments and events, including the 2014 Irish Kickboxing Open, 2014 WAKO (World Association of Kickboxing Organizations) tournament in Canada, 2014 Brazilian Kickboxing World Cup and a history-making USA vs. Cuba tournament in Havana, Cuba in 2015.

As of 2016, he was training fighters and teaching classes at Team Karate Centers in Woodland Hills, Los Angeles. In 2018 he was teaching at House Of Champions in California.

=== Other ===
Cunningham grew up with siblings Julie, Zoey, Natalie, Vertille, Bert and Patrick. His son Chazz Christian Cunningham was born in 1998. Cunningham has written two books: the kickboxing training manual Civilized Warring (1995) and the co-authored Testimonials of a Legendary Champion (2013).

== Championships and accomplishments ==
=== Boxing ===
- Edmonton Golden Gloves – Gold Medal – 1981
- Canadian Games – Bronze Medal – 1981
- #1 ranked Lightweight boxer in Canada – 1986

=== Kickboxing and Muay Thai ===
- World Kickboxing Association
  - WKA Kickboxing World Lightweight Champion
  - 1986 WKA Kickboxing World Super Lightweight Champion
  - 1993 WKA Kickboxing World light welterweight Champion
- Karate International Council of Kickboxing
  - K.I.C.K. Super Lightweight Intercontinental Champion
- International Muay Thai Federation
  - 1988 IMF World Junior Welterweight Champion
- World Martial Arts Challenge
  - W.M.A.C. Junior Welterweight World Champion
- International Sport Kickboxing Association
  - 1992 ISKA. Oriental Rules World Light Welterweight Champion (2 defenses)
  - 1998 ISKA inaugural Hall of Fame inductee

== Kickboxing record ==
Professional Kickboxing record (incomplete)
49 wins (21 (T)KOs), 1 Loss, 2 Draws
Date	Result	Opponent	Event	Location	Method	Round	Time
1996-06-01	Win	(France) Dida Diafat		Paris, France	Decision	12	2:00
Defends ISKA Oriental rules World Light-welterweight (-64.5kg) title.
1993-12-04	Win	(United Kingdom) Ronnie Green	W.K.A. Event at Mirage Hotel	Las Vegas, Nevada, USA	Decision (unanimous)	12	2:00
Wins WKA Kickboxing World light welterweight title.
1992-11-21	Draw	(France) Dida Diafat	ISKA Kickboxing	Paris, France	Decision	12	2:00
Defends ISKA Oriental rules World Light-welterweight (-64.5kg) title.
1992-03-16	Win	(United States) Chris Anderson	World Martial Arts Challenge	Las Vegas, Nevada, United States	TKO (corner stoppage/low kicks)	7	
Defends WMAC World light-welterweight title. Later recognized as ISKA Oriental rules World light-welterweight (-64.5kg) title.
1990-07-07	Win	(United States) Lafayette Lawson	K.I.C.K. event at Caesars Palace	Las Vegas, Nevada, United States	Decision (unanimous)	12	2:00
Defends K.I.C.K. Intercontinental Super Lightweight title.
1990-06-16	Win	(Thailand) Sagat Petchyindee		Sydney, Australia	Decision (unanimous)	11	2:00
Defends K.I.C.K. Intercontinental Super Lightweight title.
1989-1990	Win	(United States) Juan Torres		Hollywood, California, United States	Decision (unanimous)	11	2:00
Defends K.I.C.K. Intercontinental Super Lightweight title.
1989-07-31	Win	(Japan) Asuka Nobuya		Hollywood, California, United States	Decision (unanimous)	11	2:00
Defends K.I.C.K. Intercontinental Super Lightweight title.
1989-06-06	Win	(Thailand) Prasert Kittikasem	1st IMF World Championships	Anaheim, California, United States	Decision (unanimous)	5	3:00
Wins the inaugural IMF World light-welterweight title.
1988-09-10	Draw	(Thailand) Sagat Petchyindee		Anaheim, California, United States	Decision (split)	5	3:00
1988-08-15	Win	(Japan) Masahiro Hada	Plaza Monumental, Julio Cesar Chaves vs Nick Perez	Tijuana, Mexico	Decision (unanimous)	10	2:00
Wins the WKA World Kickboxing Super Lightweight title.
1987-	Win	(United States) Ken Ahate		Yuma, Arizona, United States			
1986-11-24	Loss	(France) Richard Sylla		Paris, France	Decision	12	2:00
Loses the WKA World Kickboxing Super Lightweight title.
1986-11-01	Win	(Japan) Okubo		Yuma, Arizona, United States			
1986-10-25	Win	(United Kingdom) Lance Lewis		London, England	Decision	7	2:00
1986-06-28	Win	(United States) Pat Romero		Reno, Nevada, United States	Decision	12	2:00
Wins WKA World Kickboxing Super Lightweight title.
1986-05-23	Win	(United States) Yohan Kim		San Jose, California, United States			
1986-02-28	Win	(United States) Phil Holdridge		Hollywood, California, United States	KO (body shot)	3	1:29
Defends WKA World Kickboxing Lightweight title.
1985-11-15	Win	(United States) Jeff Ortzow		Tijuana, Mexico			
1985-10-04	Win	(United States) Angel Gutierez		Tijuana, Mexico			
1985-04-06	Win	(United States) Robert Visitacion		Northridge, California, United States			
1984-10-13	Win	(United States) Matt Moncayo		Los Angeles, California United States			
1984-07-27	Win	(Thailand) Khaosod Sitpraprom		Los Angeles, California, United States	Decision (unanimous)	5	3:00
1984-06-01	Win	(United States) Charlie Gallegos		Edmonton, Canada			
1984-03-24	Win	(Canada) Tom Larouche		Vancouver, Canada			
1984-02-24	Win	(Thailand) Janrob Muangsurin		Hollywood, California, United States	KO (high kick)		
1983-07-01	Win	(United States) Dave Johnston		United States			
1982-09-06	Win	(United States) Rod Kei		Edmonton, Canada			
1982-06-21	Win	(Canada) Gordy Gong					
1982-03-08	Win	Fred Peraldo		Edmonton, Canada			
1981-08-10	Win	(United States) Juan Torres		Trail, British Columbia, Canada			
1981-03-01	Win	(Canada) Robillard		Edmonton, Canada			
1981-02-01	Win	(Canada) Gordy Gong		Vancouver, Canada	TKO (doctor stoppage)	3	
Cunningham's professional debut. Wins Western Canada super lightweight kickboxing title.
Legend: Win Loss Draw/No contest Notes

== See also ==
- List of male kickboxers
