= Righting Wrongs =

1986 Hong Kong film by Corey Yuen

- Original film poster
- Traditional Chinese: 執法先鋒
- Simplified Chinese: 执法先锋
- Literal meaning: Law Enforcement Pioneer
- Hanyu Pinyin: Zhí Fǎ Xiān Fēng
- Jyutping: Zap1 Faat3 Sin1 Fung1
- Directed by: Corey Yuen
- Written by: Szeto Chuek-hon; Barry Wong
- Produced by: Yuen Biao; Corey Yuen
- Starring: Yuen Biao; Cynthia Rothrock; Melvin Wong; Wu Ma; Roy Chiao; Corey Yuen
- Cinematography: Tom Lau
- Edited by: Peter Cheung
- Music by: Romeo Diaz; Stephen Shing
- Production companies: Golden Harvest; Bo Ho Films; Paragon Films
- Distributed by: Golden Harvest
- Release date: 27 November 1986
- Running time: 96 minutes
- Country: Hong Kong
- Language: Cantonese
- Box office: HK$10,751,259

Righting Wrongs (Chinese: 執法先鋒; Jyutping: Zap Faat Sin Fung) is a 1986 Hong Kong action film produced and directed by Corey Yuen, and also produced by and starring Yuen Biao, both of whom also serve as the film's action directors. The film also co-stars Cynthia Rothrock, Melvin Wong, Wu Ma, Roy Chiao and director Yuen himself. Righting Wrongs is one of Yuen Biao's better known films that he made without film industry compatriots Sammo Hung and Jackie Chan.

== Plot ==
Jason Ha Ling-ching is a dedicated, by the books prosecutor who has tried to maintain patience and tolerance under the somewhat flimsy laws of the court. However, when his mentor is publicly gunned down in New Zealand and the key witness of Ha's latest case and his entire family is wiped out overnight, Ha can no longer go by the book.

Ha's initial plan is to take the law into his own hands and kill the two men he believes called for his witness' murder. He is successful in killing the first, which causes the Hong Kong Police Department to wake up and take action to regain order. Enter Senior Inspector Cindy Si, who is put on the case to find the killer under her superior, Superintendent Wong Ching-wai. However, when Ha goes to kill the second defendant, Chow Ting-kwong, he is already dead. Unbeknownst to them, both of the defendants were working under an even higher power, known only as "Crown". However, it is soon discovered that "Crown" is none other than Superintendent Wong, who was also Chow's killer.

Once Si realizes that Wong is the true mastermind behind all of the recent murders taking place, she and Ha finally work together to bring him in to prove he is not "above the law". Si storms through an airport hangar to confront Wong, but is fatally impaled by Wong using a hand drill. Ha arrives at the scene to fight Wong in the hangar and aboard a plane. Ha kills Wong with an axe to the back of the neck and jumps off the plane before it crashes, but dies on impact after landing into the ocean and his lifeless body afloats.

=== Alternate ending ===
In an alternate ending used in the English and Mandarin versions, both Si and Ha survive. Ha, however, is arrested and sentenced to eight years in prison for manslaughter (the Mandarin dub has him given a life sentence for first-degree murder).

The 2022 UK Blu-ray release features two additional endings - both of which alternate on the fates of either Si or Ha. The viewer can choose between the four different endings of the "Ultimate Cut" or let the "Ending Randomiser" select the ending.

An unused edit of the Hong Kong ending sees a yacht pass by Ha's lifeless body on the ocean. The women aboard want to save him, but the yacht's owner turns the ship away instead.

== Cast ==
- Yuen Biao as Jason Ha Ling-Ching
- Cynthia Rothrock as Senior Inspector Cindy Si
- Roy Chiao as Magistrate Judge
- Melvin Wong as Superintendent Wong Ching-Wai
- Louis Fan as Sammy Yu Chi-Man
- Corey Yuen as "Bad Egg"
- Sandy Chan as Jason Ha's Girlfriend
- Chung Fat as Red Porsche Policeman
- Wu Ma as Uncle Tsai
- Peter Cunningham as Black Assassin
- Lau Sing-ming as Sammy's Grandfather
- Karen Sheperd as Karen
- Tai Po as Yellow Shirt Cop
- James Tien - Chow Ting-Kwong
- Hsu Hsia as Mr. Leung (protected witness)
- Lau Chau-sang as Cop
- Chow Kam-kong as Station Cop
- Stephen Chan as Hung
- Siu Bo as Cop Guarding Mr. Leung / Hangar Thug (2 roles)
- Yuen Miu as Cop Guarding Mr. Leung
- King Lee as Cop
- Paul Chang as "Four-Eyes Bill"
- Hsiao Hou
- Fruit Chan

== Theme song ==
- Proud (狂傲)
  - Composer: Akira Mitake
  - Lyricist: Lo Keok-chim
  - Singer: Jacky Cheung

== Production ==
According to Rothrock, Golden Harvest originally signed her to play the villain opposite of Jackie Chan in Armour of God, but when production halted due to Chan's near-fatal filming accident, the studio reassigned Rothrock to Righting Wrongs with Biao. While practicing her moves for the film, she injured her right ACL; rather than take time off to undergo surgery, she proceeded to shoot her scenes using her left leg for her kicks. Filming lasted five-and-a-half months.

During filming, Biao sustained a back injury while filming the scene where his character jumped off the second story of a house, despite landing feet-first on some padding dressed up as grass.

When the studio needed another female martial artist for the film, Rothrock recommended Karen Sheperd. Upon arriving in Hong Kong, Sheperd demanded that her character should not die, as it would ruin her reputation. In addition, she refused to kill a boy, as written on the screenplay. After Rothrock and Sheperd's fight scene was completed, the crew filmed a body double doing the scenes Sheperd refused to do, including her character's death.

The film's original ending was met with a negative reception during its midnight screening in Hong Kong; because of this, Rothrock stopped filming China O'Brien and flew from Los Angeles to Hong Kong to reshoot the ending for the Mandarin and international versions.

== Release ==
The English dub of the film was released internationally as Above the Law. In the Philippines, the film was released by First Films as Fight to Win II, connecting it to the unrelated film The Magic Crystal (released as Fight to Win in the country).

=== Home media ===
Righting Wrongs was released on DVD in the U.S. by Dragon Dynasty on 29 May 2007 under the title Above the Law.

The film was released on Blu-ray in the U.S. by Vinegar Syndrome on 30 August 2022. The three-disc set includes the original 96-minute Hong Kong cut, the 100-minute international Mandarin cut, and the 92-minute English Above the Law cut, plus the 1990 documentary The Best of the Martial Arts Films.

Righting Wrongs was released on Blu-ray in the UK by 88 Films on 24 October 2022. The two-disc set includes all three edits and a 106-minute "Ultimate Cut" that combines both Hong Kong and international endings and adds two re-edited endings that can be randomly selected by the player.

== Accolades ==
Accolades
Ceremony	Category	Recipient	Outcome
6th Hong Kong Film Awards	Best Supporting Actor	Wu Ma	Nominated
6th Hong Kong Film Awards	Best Action Direction	Corey Yuen, Yuen Biao, Mang Hoi and Tsui Hark	Nominated
