= Kathleen Garrett =

American actress

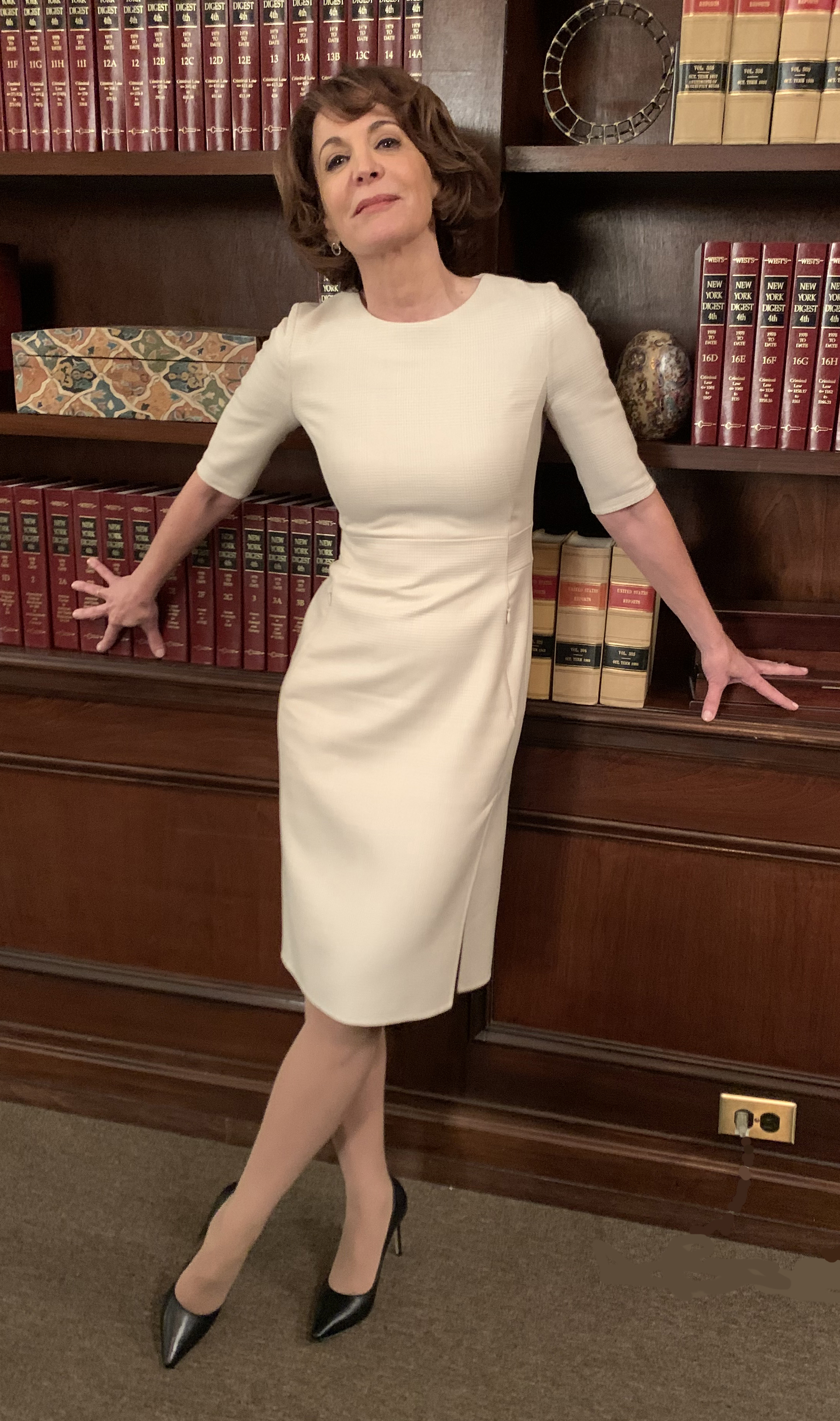
- Garrett as Judge Nina Larkin in Power Book II: Ghost
- Occupations: Actress, author, voice-over talent
- Years active: 1982–present
- Website: https://www.kathleengarrett.com/

Kathleen Garrett is an American actress, author, and voice-over talent.

== Career ==
Kathleen Garrett recurs in the series Power Book II: Ghost on Starz! and Inventing Anna on Netflix. She is also in The Trial of the Chicago 7 directed by Aaron Sorkin. She recurred on Law & Order as Judge Susan Moretti and several episodes of Law & Order: Special Victims Unit as well as multiple guest star roles in other series.

Garrett performed in and co-produced the solo play, The Last Flapper by William Luce at the Tiffany Theatres in Los Angeles, receiving positive reviews.

Garrett played the role of a Vulcan captain in the Star Trek: Deep Space Nine episode "Vortex". She later appeared in Star Trek: Voyager episode "Muse" as Tanis (Kelis' species), a stage actor who portrays Captain Kathryn Janeway. Garrett worked again with Star Trek: Voyager actor Robert Beltran in Beltran's production of Hamlet, playing the role of Gertrude. Garrett played the role of Mrs. Alving in the New York City production of Henrik Ibsen's Ghosts at the Century Theatre.

Garrett voiced the role of Pamela Voorhees in trailers for the 2009 Friday the 13th, causing a controversy. Betsy Palmer thought it was her own voice in the film and threatened to sue Paramount. Paramount stated that it would be impossible to pull clean audio from the original film, since the dialogue was tied to music and sound effects, which is why they brought in Garrett to recite the iconic lines.

Garrett appeared in the Law & Order: Special Victims Unit episode based on the Dominique Strauss-Kahn case, as a character based on Anne Sinclair, the then-wife of Dominique Strauss-Kahn.

She continues to work in television, film, theatre, commercials and voice-overs.

== Awards ==
As part of the cast of The Trial Of The Chicago 7, Garrett received the 2020 Screen Actors Guild Award for Outstanding Performance by a Cast in a Motion Picture. She also won Clio Award for Outstanding Performance of an Actor in a Commercial. She was awarded the Los Angeles Drama Critics Circle Award, the Back Stage Garland Award, the Robbie Award, Ovation Nomination and LA Weekly nomination for her performance in the West Coast Premiere of Jean Cocteau's Indiscretions.

== Personal life ==
Garret's memoir short-story The 'Figgers': The Day a 12 Year-Old Foiled the FBI, telling how she and her sisters foiled an FBI arrest of her father, is published in two parts by Zocalo Public Square and syndicated internationally.

== Filmography ==
=== Film ===
Year	Film	Role	Notes
1982	For Lovers Only	Mrs. Packman	Television film
1986	Child's Cry	Principal	Television film
1991	Mrs. Lambert Remembers Love	Darlene	Television film
1992	Calendar Girl, Cop, Killer? The Bambi Bembenek Story	Paula Fulton	Television film
1993	Irresistible Force	Arla Stone	Television film
1999	The Souler Opposite	Julianne	
2004	Copshop	Linda Aratow	Television film
2007	American Gangster	Mrs. Cattano	
2020	The Trial of the Chicago 7	Secretary	
2022	Ghost of Christmas Always	Mrs. Winchester	Television film

=== Television ===
Year	Title	Role	Notes
1989	Hooperman	Candy Delight	Episode: "The Sure Thing"
1989	Thirtysomething	Younger Rose	Episode: "Be a Good Girl"
1990	Head of the Class	Harvard Recruiter	Episode: "Recruitment Day"
1990	The Outsiders	Mrs. Jenkins	Episode: The Beat Goes On
1991	Shannon's Deal	Linnette	Episode: "Martimony"
1991	Matlock	Marjorie Wood	Episode: "The Game Show"
1993	Home Improvement	Stacey	Episode: "Ex Marks the Spot"
1993	Star Trek: Deep Space Nine	Vulcan officer	Episode: "Vortex"
1991-1993	The New WKRP in Cincinnati	Dana Burns	26 episodes
1994	Phenom	Susan	Episode: "Spring Breakout"
1995	ER	Mrs. Meeker	Episode: "Long Day's Journey"
1995	Murder, She Wrote	Serena Rundle	Episode: "Deadly Bidding"
1996	Diagnosis: Murder	Penny Fleming	Episode: "Love is Murder"
1996	The John Larroquette Show	Linda Armstrong	Episode: "Cosmetic Perjury"
1996	Baywatch Nights	Carmen Ray	Episode: "Heat Rays"
1996	Dark Skies	Donna Hargrove	Episode: "Dark Days Night"
1997	Touched by an Angel	Laura Sanders	Episode: "An Angel by Any Other Name"
1998	3rd Rock from the Sun	Celia	Episode: "The Great Dickdater
1998	Dharma & Greg	Audrey	Episode: "The Cat's Out of the Bag"
1999	Providence	Ruthy	Episode: "Taste of Providence"
1999	Melrose Place	Mrs. Marlin	Episode: "Floral Knowledge"
2000	Beverly Hills, 90210	Marion	Episodes: "And Don't Forget to Give Me Back my Black T-Shirt" and "Love is Blind"
2000	Star Trek: Voyager	Tanis	Episode: "Muse"
2001	100 Centre Street	Dr. Sally Greenburg	Episode: "Bottlecaps
2002	First Monday	Zina Novelli (young)	Episode: "Showdown"
2002	Without a Trace	Mrs. Deaver	Episodes: "Suspect" and Silent Partner"
2006	Malcolm in the Middle	Mrs. Werner	Episode: "Bride of Ida"
2008	Shark	Judge Mary Osman	Episode: "Leaving Las Vegas"
2008-2010	Law & Order	Judge Susan Morretti	4 episodes
2016	The Mysteries of Laura	Helen	Episode: "The Mystery of the Morning Jog"
2019	The Deuce	Susan	Episode: This Trust Thing"
2020	Billions	Maureen Ryder	Episode: "The Nordic Model"
2022	FBI	Nicole Trenholm	Episode: "Grief"
2023	NCIS: Los Angeles	Miraslava Borisova	Episode: "Blood Bank"
2025	All's Fair	Dr. Joan Wesson	Episode: "Interior Law Offices"
