= The Sword of Bushido =

1990 Australian action film

- Directed by: Adrian Carr
- Starring: Richard Norton
- Country of origin: Australia
- Original language: English

Production
- Producer: John D. Lamond

Original release
- Release: 1990

Sword of the Bushido is a 1990 action film directed by Adrian Carr and starring Richard Norton, Rochelle Ashana, and Kowit Wattanakul.

== Plot ==
U.S. Navy reserve officer Zac Connors (Richard Norton) goes to Thailand to find out what happened to his grandfather, a soldier in World War 2, whose plane went down a few days after the war ended. He is attacked by a group of thugs in the forest but rescued by a rebellious young woman named Suay (Rochelle Ashana) and her friend Chai (Kowit Wattanakul). The three of them team up to fight the gangs that target Connors to stop him from taking the ancient Sword of Bushido which has great ceremonial and cultural value in Japan.
