= Out of Control (1985 film) =

- Directed by: Allan Holzman
- Written by: Sandra Weintraub; Vicangelo Bulluck
- Produced by: Daniel Grodnik; Fred Weintraub
- Starring: Martin Hewitt
- Cinematography: John A. Alonzo
- Music by: Hawk
- Distributed by: New World Pictures
- Release date: 1985
- Language: English

Out of Control is a 1985 American-Yugoslav action-drama film directed by Allan Holzman and starring Martin Hewitt, Andrew J. Lederer and Betsy Russell.

== Plot ==
After graduation, 8 teenagers fly a seaplane to a private island; bad weather causes the plane to crash. They end up on a deserted island, but they are not alone and must fight drug smugglers to survive.

== Cast ==
- Martin Hewitt as Keith Toland
- Andrew J. Lederer as Elliot
- Betsy Russell as Chrissie Baret
- Claudia Udy as Tina
- Cindi Dietrich as Robin
- Richard Kantor as Gary
- Sherilyn Fenn as Katie
- Jim Youngs as Cowboy
- Pavle Balenovic as Pete
