= China O'Brien II =

- Directed by: Robert Clouse
- Written by: Robert Clouse; Craig Clyde; James Hennessy
- Produced by: Golden Harvest, Fred Weintraub, Sandra Weintraub
- Starring: Cynthia Rothrock
- Distributed by: Golden Harvest; Media Asia
- Release dates: June 1990 (United Kingdom); 1992 (United States)
- Running time: 92 minutes
- Country: United States
- Language: English

China O'Brien II is a 1990 martial arts film produced by Golden Harvest Studios and directed by Robert Clouse. It stars Cynthia Rothrock, Richard Norton and Keith Cooke and is a sequel to the 1990 film China O'Brien.

== Plot ==
Thanks to Sheriff China O'Brien (Cynthia Rothrock), Beaver Creek, Utah has been designated the safest community in the state. But the town once again becomes unsafe when it becomes the hideout of escaped drug kingpin Charlie Baskin (Harlow Marks).

Baskin wants revenge on an ex-associate, Frank Atkins (Frank Magner), who testified against Baskin and is now residing in Beaver Creek with some embezzled drug money that Baskin wants back.

When Baskin starts terrorizing Frank, China and her deputies Matt Conroy (Richard Norton) and Dakota (Keith Cooke) help Frank fend off Baskin and his henchmen. Baskin kidnaps Frank's wife Annie Atkins (Tricia Quai) and his daughter Jill Atkins (Tiffany Soter), luring China, Matt, Dakota, and Frank into a confrontation against Baskin.

== Cast ==
- Cynthia Rothrock as Sheriff Lori "China" O'Brien
- Richard Norton as Deputy Sheriff Matt Conroy
- Keith Cooke as Deputy Sheriff Dakota
- Frank Magner as Frank Atkins
- Harlow Marks as Charlie Baskin
- Nelson Woodbury as Reporter #2
- Melanie Good as Stripper
- Billy Blanks as Baskin Fighter #1 (uncredited)

== Production ==
Parts of the film were shot in Park City, Utah.

== Reception ==
The film is regarded by fans as being on equal footing with the original in terms of both martial arts action and production quality although it was criticised for once again having an aging villain with no fighting skills, who offered no final confrontation.

Both films became video rental store staples for martial arts fans and were released as a double VHS in 1991.
