= Fred Weintraub =

American film producer (1928–2017)

- Born: Fred Robert Weintraub; April 27, 1928; The Bronx, New York, U.S.
- Died: March 5, 2017 (aged 88); Pacific Palisades, California, U.S.
- Occupations: Film producer; television producer
- Known for: Original owner of The Bitter End, martial arts and action films
- Website: fredweintraub.com

Fred Robert Weintraub (April 27, 1928 – March 5, 2017) was an American film and television producer and writer.

== Career ==
=== Background ===
Weintraub was the original owner and host of The Bitter End in New York City's Greenwich Village. Weintraub discovered singers and stand-up comedians such as Peter, Paul and Mary, Lenny Bruce (with whom he was arrested for obscenity), Randy Newman and The Isley Brothers. The club also featured early performances of Neil Diamond, Woody Allen, Frank Zappa and the Mothers of Invention, Ricky Nelson, Nina Simone, Dustin Hoffman, Charles Aznavour, Lily Tomlin, Stevie Wonder, Kris Kristofferson, Joni Mitchell, George Carlin, Bob Dylan, Harry Chapin, Bill Cosby and Phil Ochs. During the early 1960s, The Bitter End hosted "Open Mike" Hootenannies every Tuesday night, showcasing young, old, known and unknown folk singers.

Weintraub is not related to fellow film producer Jerry Weintraub.

=== Films and television ===
Moving west in the mid-1960s, Weintraub created, wrote, and produced several television shows including Hootenanny and Dukes of Hazzard. Beginning with Rage, then Enter the Dragon, Weintraub produced dozens of movies, many with a martial arts theme (like China O'Brien with Cynthia Rothrock, for example), as well as directing a documentary on Bruce Lee, Bruce Lee: The Curse of the Dragon (1993).

In 1970, Weintraub became an Executive Vice President of Warner Bros. One of the first films he oversaw for the studio was Woodstock. In 1972, he became an independent producer and made a number of adventure films, including Enter the Dragon, starring Bruce Lee.

One of Weintraub's documentary films was It's Showtime (1976), which consisted of film clips profiling various animal actors, such as Rin Tin Tin, Flipper, Trigger, and Asta, with commentary from the actors who worked with them, and including footage of James Cagney, Jimmy Durante, Cary Grant, Maureen O'Sullivan, Dick Powell, Ronald Reagan, and Mickey Rooney working with animal stars.

In 1978, Weintraub and Gordon McLendon worked on an idea for a TV series about the CIA. They were disillusioned with the negative portrayal of the agency, such as in the film Three Days of the Condor. As a result, McLendon and CIA veteran David Atlee Phillips approached CIA Director Stansfield Turner in March 1978 about the idea, although nothing came of the proposal.

=== Other work ===
In 2011, Weintraub published his memoir, Bruce Lee, Woodstock and Me, along with collaborator David Fields, recalling his fifty-year career in the entertainment industry.

== Death ==
Weintraub died on March 5, 2017, in his Pacific Palisades home due to natural causes related to Parkinson's disease. He was 88.

He is survived by his wife Jackie; children Sandra, Barbara, Max, and Zachary; and four grandchildren.

== Filmography ==
=== Producer ===
Title	Year	Notes
Christmas at F.A.O. Schwarz	1968	Executive producer; television film
Rage	1972	
Invasion of the Bee Girls	1973	Executive producer
Enter the Dragon	1973	
Black Belt Jones	1974	
Truck Turner	1974	
Golden Needles	1974	
The Ultimate Warrior	1975	
Trial by Combat	1976	
It's Showtime	1976	Documentary film
Hot Potato	1976	
Checkered Flag or Crash	1977	
Outlaw Blues	1977	Executive producer
The Pack	1977	
The Promise	1979	
Jaguar Lives!	1979	
Tom Horn	1980	
The Big Brawl	1980	
Force: Five	1981	
High Road to China	1983	
Gymkata	1985	
Out of Control	1985	
The Women's Club	1987	
My Father, My Son	1988	Television film
The Best of the Martial Arts Films	1990	Documentary film
Chips, the War Dog	1990	Executive producer; television film
China O'Brien	1990	
A Show of Force	1990	Co-producer
China O'Brien II	1990	Direct-to-video
Born to Ride	1991	
The JFK Assassination: The Jim Garrison Tapes	1992	Documentary film
Gypsy Eyes	1992	
Trouble Bound	1993	
The Curse of the Dragon	1993	Documentary film
Backstreet Justice	1994	
Under the Gun	1995	Executive producer
Triplecross	1995	Television films
Playboy's Really Naked Truth	1995-97	Executive producer (21 episodes)
Undertow	1996	Television film
The New Adventures of Robin Hood	1997-98	Executive producer (53 episodes)
The Devil's Arithmetic	1999	Television films
Perilous	2000	Television films
Amazons and Gladiators	2001	
Warrior Angels	2002	
Endangered Species	2003	
Dream Warrior	2003	
La Femme Musketeer	2004	Mini-series (2 episodes)
Patton's Ghost Corps	2006	Executive producer; direct-to-video documentary

=== Writer ===
Title	Year	Notes
Black Belt Jones	1974	Story
Trial by Combat	1976	Story
Hot Potato	1976	Characters
The Promise	1979	Story
The Big Brawl	1980	Story
The Women's Club	1987	Story
The New Adventures of Robin Hood	1997-1998	Creator (53 episodes)

=== Director ===
Title	Year	Notes
It's Showtime	1976	Documentary film
The Curse of the Dragon	1993	Documentary film

=== Other credits ===
Title	Year	Notes
Hootenanny	1963-1964	Talent coordinator (2 episodes)
Black Belt Jones	1974	Cameo as "Judge"
The Dukes of Hazzard	1979	Consultant (5 episodes)
