= The Souler Opposite =

- Directed by: Bill Kalmenson
- Screenplay by: Bill Kalmenson
- Produced by: Tani Cohen
- Starring: Christopher Meloni; Timothy Busfield; Janel Moloney
- Cinematography: Amit Bhattacharya
- Edited by: Timothy Snell
- Music by: Peter Himmelman
- Release date: October 2, 1998 (Los Angeles)
- Running time: 104 minutes
- Country: United States
- Language: English

The Souler Opposite is a 1998 American romantic comedy-drama film written and directed by Bill Kalmenson and starring Christopher Meloni, Timothy Busfield and Janel Moloney.

== Cast ==
- Christopher Meloni as Barry Singer
- Janel Moloney as Thea Douglas
- Timothy Busfield as Robert Levin
- John Putch as Lester
- Allison Mackie as Diane
- Kathleen Garrett as Julianne
- Rutanya Alda as Thea's Mom
- Josh Keaton as Young Barry
- Jed Rhein as Young Robert
- Steve Landesberg as Himself
- Robert Fields as Jay Smiley
- Devon Meade as Sandra
