= Lady Dragon =

- Directed by: David Worth
- Written by: Clifford Mohr (screenplay); David Worth (story)
- Produced by: Sam S. Rony S.S; Gope T. Samtani
- Starring: Cynthia Rothrock; Richard Norton; Bella Esperance
- Cinematography: David Worth
- Edited by: Maruli Ara; Amin Kertaraharja
- Music by: Jim West
- Production company: Cynthia Rothrock Productions
- Distributed by: Imperial Entertainment
- Release date: 1992
- Running time: 86 minutes
- Language: English

Lady Dragon is a 1992 martial arts film starring actress and martial artist Cynthia Rothrock and Bella Esperance.

== Plot ==
Kathy Galagher is on a mission of revenge against ruthless crime boss Ludwig Hauptman, who ordered the death of her husband on the day of her wedding. She gets close to Hauptman, only to be punished for her blind vengeance. Kathy is found by a martial arts master that teaches her a fighting style so she can exact revenge against her enemy.

== Cast ==
- Cynthia Rothrock as Kathy Galagher
- Richard Norton as Ludwig Hauptman
- Robert Ginty as Gibson
- Bella Esperance as Susan
- Hengky Tornando as Allan
- Thomas Forcher as John Galagher
- Advent Bangun as Ringo
- H.I.M. Damsyik as Chin
- Henry Surentu as Sonny
- Syarief Friant as Marco
- Tanka as Hans
- Atek Darmo as Helmut
- Gino Makasutji as Andre
- Rony S.S. as Assassin
- Pitradjaya Burnama as Grandfather
- Diaz Tangkilisan as Boy
- Christine as Battered Girl
- Lydia Febriani as Mud Wrestler #1
- Ruby Rimba as Mud Wrestler #2
- Karsiman Gada as Bartender
- Silva Sitha Dewi as Bikini Girl #1
- Linda as Bikini Girl #2
- Ita Tanjung as Bikini Girl #3
- Angela Veiny as Bikini Girl #4

== Sequel ==
A sequel was released in 1993, with Rothrock returning to star with Billy Drago and Sam J. Jones with Worth as director.
