= The Magic Crystal =

1986 Hong Kong film by Wong Jing

- Film poster

Chinese name
- Traditional Chinese: 魔翡翠
- Simplified Chinese: 魔翡翠
Transcriptions
Standard Mandarin
- Hanyu Pinyin: Mó Fěi Cuì
Yue: Cantonese
- Jyutping: Mo1 Fei2 Ceoi3
- Directed by: Wong Jing
- Screenplay by: Wong Jing
- Produced by: Wallace Chung
- Starring: Andy Lau; Max Mok; Cynthia Rothrock; Natalis Chan; Siu Ban-ban; Wong Jing; Sharla Cheung
- Cinematography: Movie Impact Cinematographers Team
- Edited by: Lau Siu-kwong
- Music by: Joseph Yip
- Production companies: Win's Entertainment; Lung Cheung Films
- Distributed by: Movie Impact
- Release dates: 23 August 1986 (Taiwan); 17 September 1986 (Hong Kong)
- Running time: 95 minutes
- Country: Hong Kong
- Language: Cantonese
- Budget: HK$28,000,000
- Box office: HK$11,383,366

The Magic Crystal (Chinese: 魔翡翠; released in the Philippines as Fight to Win) is a 1986 Hong Kong action film written and directed by Wong Jing. The film stars Andy Lau, Max Mok and Cynthia Rothrock.

The film is primarily set in Athens, Greece and Hong Kong. In the film, a mercenary has to rescue an archaeologist from the KGB.

== Plot ==
An important document, to be presented as evidence in court the next day against a triad boss, has been stolen from the Hong Kong police. Due to time constraints, Sergeant Shek of the Special Duty Unit recruits mercenary Andy Lo, known as the "Eagle Hunter", to retrieve it. Andy breaks into the triad boss's mansion where he fights his henchmen and tricks the triad boss into opening his safe where the document is hidden.

Later, Andy receives a letter from his archaeologist friend, Shum Kwan, who discovered a mysterious artifact in Greece and wants Andy to examine it with him, but also warns him to be cautious as Shum is being tailed by international spies. Andy arrives in Greece with his nephew Ban-Ban and assistant Snooker. While Andy is sightseeing at the Parthenon with Ban-Ban and Snooker, he bumps into Shum. Shum is ambushed and chased down by KGB thugs posing as Interpol agents. Andy, along with actual agents Cindy Morgan and Billy, give chase and beat up the thugs while Shum escapes. Afterward, Cindy and Billy reveal to Andy that they know of his identity as the Eagle Hunter, inform him of Shum's situation of being hunted by the KGB, and persuade him to cooperate with them to help his friend.

Shum arrives at the hotel where Andy is residing. He gets shot by a KGB thug posing as Andy's assistant, but manages to subdue the thug and escape. Shum leaves a baggage containing the mysterious artifact in Andy's hotel room before being captured by Karov, head of the KGB. Shum is tranquilized by Karov when he refuses to tell him the whereabouts of the artifact, but Karov is able to deduce that it may be kept by Andy.

After returning to Hong Kong, Andy's older sister informs him about a phone call made by Shum's younger sister, Winnie, and gives him the address of a gymnasium where she trains. Ban-Ban opens the luggage containing the mysterious artifact, the Magic Crystal, a large piece of jade with magical powers that can talk, and befriends it. Andy meets Winnie, who states that she has had no news of her brother for a month. Andy, Winnie and Lo Sai, an aggressive stalker of Winnie, are ambushed by Karov's thugs and Andy fights them off and rescues Winnie. Winnie goes to hide in Andy's house, while Lo Sai also follows, much to everyone's annoyance.

Ban-Ban and the jade play magical tricks on Lo Sai and defeat a bully at school. Sergeant Shek questions Andy, Winnie, and Lo Sai about their attack the previous evening. When Cindy and Billy also arrive in Hong Kong, they meet with Andy before running into Karov, who demands Andy hand over the jade. Andy fights off Karov's thugs, escape with Winnie and tells Snooker to take a look at their baggage brought back from Greece. Lo Sai discovers the jade, which gives him the power to command people to do his bidding. However, Lo Sai does not realize that this power only works within five feet of the jade; he goes to rob a bank by himself and is taken to an asylum as a result.

Andy receives a call from Shek that he has found Shum and is at his house. Andy arrives at Shek's home and finds both Shek and Shum dead before he is knocked unconscious. Andy wakes up being arrested by Cindy and Billy, who believe he murdered Shek. Meanwhile, Andy's sister is attacked by Karov and his men at home, but she fends them off until Cindy arrives, whereupon Karov escapes after kidnapping both Ban-Ban and the jade.

Karov hires an assassin to kill Andy with ice bullets, but the attempt fails. Andy escapes from prison with help from Billy, who reveals that he's doing this to mislead Krakov's moles in the police force. The two join Cindy, Snooker and Andy's sister at Karov's headquarters, where they fight Karov and his henchmen. Karov escapes, but they are able to rescue Ban-Ban, and Cindy suggests to keep the child protected at the police station. At the station the jade activates, enabling Ban-Ban to leave the station and take the jade to Greece by himself. A police mole informs Karov about Ban-Ban's whereabouts but is then arrested by Billy.

Andy, Snooker, Cindy and Billy rush to Greece, where Cindy receives intel that Ban-Ban paid for a boat ride to a mysterious island. Ban-Ban is once again captured by Karov on his way to the island. Andy, Cindy and Snooker follow them into an underground complex filled with booby traps while Billy chases Karov, and the trio finds a chamber containing a high-technology device and an alien in suspended animation. Their presence activates a telepathic recording detailing the alien's crashlanding on Earth over 2,000 years ago, how it founded Greece's civilization, and that the jade, which is a living computer, can help him return to his home planet.

Arriving at the chamber, Karov also hears this message, and a fight ensures between Andy, Cindy and Billy against Karov and his thugs. Andy and Cindy join forces to fight Karov, who chases Ban-Ban, but Ban-Ban rejoins the jade with its socket, thereby reviving the alien and activating a transport beam. Desperately trying to seize the alien, Karov is caught in the beam and transported away from Earth. The jade dies after using all its energy and bids farewell to a crying Ban-Ban before it hatches a baby jade, much to the boy's delight.

== Cast ==
- Andy Lau as Andy Lo (羅力), a mercenary employed by the Hong Kong police and is branded as the Eagle Hunter No. 1 (獵鷹第一號).
- Max Mok as Billy, Cindy's Interpol partner.
- Cynthia Rothrock as Cindy Morgan, an Interpol agent.
- Natalis Chan as Lo Sai (老細), an aggressive pursuer of Winnie with low IQ and can be easily manipulated by the Magic Crystal.
- Siu Ban-ban as Ban-ban (彬彬), Andy's nephew who befriends the Magic Crystal.
- Wong Jing as Snooker, Andy's bumbling assistant.
- Sharla Cheung as Winnie Shum (沈雲妮), Shum Kwan's younger sister.
- Shum Wai as a triad boss captured by Andy.
- Chung Fat as the triad boss's thug who fights Andy.
- Hung San-nam as the triad boss's thug who fights Andy.
- Phillip Ko as Shum Kwan (沈昆), Andy's archeologist friend who discovered the Magic Cristal in Greece and is hunted by Karov.
- Wong Mei-mei as Andy's older sister and Ban-Ban's mother.
- Eddie Maher as Karovis thug in Greece
- Tony Leung Siu-hung as Karov's thug in Greece
- Richard Norton as Karov, leader of the KGB who is after the Magic Crystal.
- Shih Kien as Sergeant Shek (石探長), Andy's employer.
- Shing Fui-On as a prisoner who is a friend of Andy.
- Jackson Ng as Karov's thug who wears a red headband and fought Cindy and Andy's sister.
- Yu Mo-lin as Maureen Yu, head coach at Winnie's gymnasium.
- Albert Lai as a cop.
- David Ho as Steve's father.

== Production ==
According to Rothrock, she injured her right ACL while Norton suffered a staph infection on his leg in the Philippines prior to the start of the film's production. Rothrock re-injured her knee while filming the fight scene in Greece; the pain caused her to accidentally stab her opponent with her spear. She also accidentally slashed Norton on the eyebrow during their fight scene.

The film features Rothrock's extensive use of weapons, as well as the Eagle Claw and Northern Praying Mantis fighting styles.

== Release ==
The Magic Crystal was released in the Philippines as Fight to Win by Pioneer Releasing, and became a box office hit, introducing Cynthia Rothrock (credited as Cindy Rothrock) to Filipino audiences. Numerous imported films were later released under new titles by various distributors to make them appear as sequels to the film:

- Fight to Win II (original title: Righting Wrongs), released by First Films on March 17, 1987
- Fight to Win Again (original title: A Book of Heroes), released by Pioneer Releasing on August 25, 1987
- Fight to Win: New Chapter (starring "Billy Chan" from Bloodsport), released by Pioneer Releasing on July 13, 1988
- The Last Fight to Win: The Bloody End (original title: Low Blow), released by Movierama Films on October 13, 1988

== See also ==
- Andy Lau filmography
- Wong Jing filmography
