= Born to Ride (1991 film) =

- Theatrical release poster
- Directed by: Graham Baker
- Written by: Michael Pardridge; Janice Hickey
- Produced by: Fred Weintraub; Sandra Weintraub
- Starring: John Stamos; John Stockwell; Teri Polo
- Cinematography: Frank Gell
- Edited by: Alan Balsam
- Music by: Shirley Walker
- Production company: Incovent Productions
- Distributed by: Warner Bros. Pictures
- Release date: May 3, 1991
- Running time: 89 minutes
- Country: United States
- Language: English

Born to Ride is a 1991 American action film directed by Graham Baker. The film was released on May 3, 1991, and starred John Stamos as a biker turned military corporal.

== Plot ==
Colonel James E. Devers's newly converted motorcycle unit has had a lot of experience riding horses, but not much riding motorcycles. Enter Grady Westfall, a biker faced with the choice of prison or teaching the military how to ride. Grady quickly proves to be a headache for Colonel Devers, who dislikes both Grady's unorthodox methods and his interest in his daughter Beryl Ann. But when Grady discovers that his unit is ill-equipped to launch a rescue mission in Spain, he decides to accompany his unit in the hopes of increasing their chance of succeeding in the dangerous mission.

== Cast ==
- John Stamos as Corporal Grady Westfall
- John Stockwell as Captain Jack Hassler
- Teri Polo as Beryl Ann Devers
- Sandy McPeak as Colonel James E. Devers (CO, 36th Div.)
- Kris Kamm as Bobby Novak
- Keith Cooke as Broadwater
- Dean Yacalis as Cartucci
- Salvator Xuereb as Levon
- Justin Lazard as Brooks
- Thom Mathews as Willis
- Garrick Hagon as Jim Bridges, State Department Official
- Matko Raguz as Esteban
- Lisa Orgolini as Claire Tate
- Ed Bishop as Dr. Tate
- Slavko Juraga as Captain Rosario

== Reception ==
The film was largely panned upon its release, and Entertainment Weekly gave the movie a D+ rating and commented that it was "a big failure on the most basic dramatic level." In a 2009 article PopCrunch listed Stamos on their "20 Worst Action Film Stars of All Time" article for his role in Born to Ride.

== Filming ==
Some scenes were filmed at Piran, now Slovenia (motorcycle race in Spain).
