= Irresistible Force (film) =

- Directed by: Kevin Hooks
- Written by: Carlton Eastlake
- Produced by: Michael Lake; Merrill H. Karpf; Christine Hart; Carleton Eastlake
- Starring: Stacy Keach; Cynthia Rothrock; Paul Winfield; Kathleen Garrett
- Cinematography: Kevan Lind
- Edited by: Andy Blumenthal; Peter Carrodus
- Music by: David Michael Frank
- Production company: CBS
- Release date: 7 May 1993 (Japan)
- Running time: 74 minutes
- Country: USA
- Language: English

Irresistible Force is a 1993 American thriller TV movie starring Stacy Keach and Cynthia Rothrock as a pair of police officers.

== Plot ==
A police sergeant (Keach) who is trying to avoid any trouble before his upcoming retirement receives an enthusiastic young agent (Rothrock) as a new partner.

== Cast ==
- Stacy Keach as Harris Stone
- Cynthia Rothrock as Charlotte Heller
- Paul Winfield as Commander Toole
- Kathleen Garrett as Arla Stone
- Michael Bacall as Jesse Delvechio
- Jerome Ehlers as Kurt
- Nicholas Hammond as Lieutenant Nash
- Christopher Neame as James Barron
- Penne Hackforth-Jones as Lieutenant Governor

== Production ==
The outdoor scenes were filmed on the Gold Coast in Queensland, Australia, while the interiors were shot at Warner Bros. Movie World on the Pacific Highway in Oxenford, Queensland. Filming began on June 14, 1993 lasting until July 15 of that year.

Cynthia Rothrock has stated the film is a personal favorite of hers. The film had been developed as a television pilot for CBS, but due to network politics related to concerns over media violence CBS shelved the pilot and did not release it in the United States. Attempts were made by Rothrock's agents to rescue the pilot from CBS and position it as a first-run syndication series which CBS stonewalled and blocked the release of any production stills or promotional images. According to Rothrock, the pilot was inundated with executive interference even during production with director Kevin Hooks receiving notes from executives giving demands like no onscreen blood or kicks to the head or groin.

== Release ==
The film was released theatrically in some international markets as well as on foreign home video markets by 20th Century Fox Home Entertainment where it performed very well. Attempts were made by Rothrock's agents to rescue the pilot from CBS and position it as a first-run syndication series which CBS stonewalled and blocked the release of any production stills or promotional images. The film was given a direct-to-video release in the United States on December 19, 1995.

== Reception ==
Film critic Adrian Martin wrote:

Filmed in a part of Australia that masquerades as America, Irresistible Force is in many ways a minor and derivative action film. Stacy Keach plays an old cop who battles a group of Die Hard-style neo-supremacist baddies occupying a high-tech shopping mall.

African-American director Kevin Hooks (Passenger 57, 1992) expertly throws in every conceivable cliché, right down to a mismatching buddy-cop for Keach. But this is where the film gets interesting, for the partner is none other than B movie legend Cynthia Rothrock.

Rothrock is one of the most exciting and engaging icons of contemporary exploitation cinema. Her persona is an unsettling mixture of classically feminine traits (such as a chic martial arts wardrobe) with an unstoppably masculine aggro. Most often presented as the 'angel of rage', Rothrock routinely murders or severely mutilates the men who have raped and tortured her.

In her previous B movies, this amazing Rothrock persona is never explained, either psychologically or sociologically. She is simply an almighty, irresistible force to be reckoned with.

This film introduces her to a mainstream audience rather more delicately. The script gives her lines about her unconventional family upbringing, her "bad attitude" towards authority, and her ability to "do the girl thing" when required. Keach functions as a dour father-teacher figure, taming her wildness.
