= Undefeatable =

1993 Hong Kong film by Godfrey Ho

- Undefeatable DVD cover
- Directed by: Godfrey Hall
- Written by: Tai Yim; Steve Harper; Robert Vassar
- Produced by: Godfrey Hall; John R. Ellis; Ricky Wong Ka-Kui; May Yim
- Starring: Cynthia Rothrock; John Miller; Don Niam; Donna Jason; Robin Shou (Bloody Mary Killer only)
- Cinematography: Philip J. Cook
- Edited by: Grand Yee
- Music by: Todd M. Hahn
- Production companies: Filmswell International Ltd.; Action Star Pictures; ITC Entertainment
- Distributed by: Whe Europe Limited; Vinegar Syndrome (Blu-ray)
- Release date: 29 September 1993
- Running time: 90 minutes
- Country: Hong Kong
- Languages: English (Undefeatable); Cantonese (Bloody Mary Killer)

Undefeatable is a 1993 Hong Kong martial arts film directed by Godfrey Ho (using the pseudonym Godfrey Hall) and starring Cynthia Rothrock, John Miller, Don Niam, and Donna Jason. The picture was a Hong Kong production, but filmed in English on location in the United States. An alternate version of the film, titled Bloody Mary Killer, was released for the Asian markets.

== Plot ==
The film follows Kristi Jones (Cynthia Rothrock) who, along with her gang, take part in Mafia-run street fights to earn money for her sister's college education. Kristi's sister hopes to become a doctor and pay for Kristi's education.

Meanwhile, an underground fighter Paul Taylor (Don Niam) - better known by his nickname "Stingray" - is left by his scared wife, Anna, after raping her, and vows to find her. Stingray has suffered from abandonment issues since early childhood and this new trauma triggers a psychotic break from reality. He begins to kidnap women who resemble his ex-wife, and subsequently tortures them and gouges their eyes out before returning their bodies to the crime scene. Kristi's sister becomes one of the victims, so Kristi tracks down Stingray with the help of police Detective Nick DiMarco (John Miller), who might just be falling for her, alongside her sister's psychiatry tutor Jennifer (Donna Jason) and Nick's partner Mike (Gerald Klein).

They eventually track down Stingray, who has kidnapped Jennifer, and fight in a warehouse where he escapes after shooting and killing Mike. Jennifer's injuries, complete with needing a cast on her arm, require that she be admitted to the hospital where she is again kidnapped by Stingray who is impersonating a doctor. Kristi and Nick chase him to a storage area where the three do battle, mostly through hand-to-hand combat. Stingray is bested by the pair, having both eyes gouged out in the process. He is then suspended by the eye-sockets with a meat hook, killing him.

The final scene shows with Kristi and her friends visiting her late sister's resting place to inform her that Stingray has finally been defeated. It is revealed that Kristi has somehow enrolled her former gang in college to give them a chance at a better life, and that Kristi has also been enrolled in college by Nick. The film ends with the group engaging in an impassioned four way high-five.

== Cast ==
- Cynthia Rothrock as Kristi Jones
- Don Niam as Paul Taylor/Stingray
  - Brian as Young Stingray
- John Miller as Detective Nick DiMarco
- Donna Jason as Dr. Jennifer Simmons
- Gerald Klein as Detective Mike
- Sunny David as Karen Jones
- Emille Davazac as Anna
- Hang Yip Yim as Hank
- Richard Yuen as Ryko
- William Buckley as Police Captain
- Mike Sutton as Undercover Cop
- Michael Sinclair Walter as Lou
- Lihn Thai as Lee, Eagle Gangleader
- Shelton Lee as 'Diablo'
- Scott Shelton as 'Bear'
- Franco Bucci as Rocco
- Gery Algie as Ron Vista
- Rosemary Monti as Myrna
- Amy Beardsley as Sally
- Kevin Maselka as Cop In Hospital
- Jackie Rutley as Betty, Jennifer's Secretary
- Joan Corcan as Charlotte, Old Woman
- John R. Ellis as Joe Petrone, Man In Wheelchair
- Michelle Butler as Joe's Daughter
- Penny as Stingray's Mother
- Eden Woodward as Sexy Woman In Mall
- Berry Ben as Robber #1 With Gun
- Robert Leach as Robber #2 With Knife
- W. Lim Sung as Male Victim #1
- C. Monique Berry as Female Victim #1
- Jody Flaherty as Naked Victim
- Phills Wong as Martial Arts Specialist
- James Kinstle as Maniac Gang Member #1
- Jason Kozowik as Maniac Gang Member #2
- Tonya Coe as Maniac Gang Member #3
- Todd Weinguard as Maniac Gang Member #4
- Kenny Yao as Maniac Gang Member #5
- Alision Holland as Eagle Gang Member #1
- Kim Holland as Eagle Gang Member #2
- Apollo Landra as Eagle Gang Member #3
- Amanda Hyatt as Eagle Gang Member #4
- Clark as Eagle Gang Member #5
- Rick Nowlin as Diablo Gang Member #1
- Jeff Pitts as Diablo Gang Member #2
- Nishan Cherry as Diablo Gang Member #3
- Crystal Gipson as Diablo Gang Member #4
- James Shelton as Diablo Gang Member #5
- Emilie Thomas as Diablo Gang Member #6
- Mike Yim as Red Dragon Gang Member #1
- Stan Kang as Red Dragon Gang Member #2
- Thang Vuong as Red Dragon Gang Member #3
- Angela Judy as Red Dragon Gang Member #4
- Georgia Gleason as Red Dragon Gang Member #5
- Alex Cho as Red Dragon Gang Member #6
- Robert McCain as Bear Gang Member #1
- Mike Wilson as Bear Gang Member #2
- Cindy Lejeune as Bear Gang Member #3
- Kathleen Wooley as Bear Gang Member #4
- Tia Stine as Bear Gang Member #5
- Mike Sarni as Italian Gang Member #1
- Tony Sarni as Italian Gang Member #2
- Willie Johnson as Gangleader (uncredited)

== Bloody Mary Killer ==
The version titled Bloody Mary Killer was re-dubbed into Chinese and features a second plot starring Robin Shou.

== Reception ==
Undefeatable gained fame at the beginning of 2006, when a video clip of its final fight began to spread on the Internet, where in one part it features Rothrock in a cast joining a fight and later doing a backflip while the two other actors constantly scream at each other. That scene was then featured on an episode of truTV's World's Dumbest Brawlers, and was included on the lists by Cracked.com, IGN and UGO.com.

The film was featured on an episode of Best of the Worst on May 23, 2015 together with Blood Debts and The Tomb. Undefeatable was deemed best of the three and praised for its action choreography and stunts. Cynthia's part was highlighted and she was compared to contemporary action stars such as Jean-Claude Van Damme and Arnold Schwarzenegger.
