= Rage (1972 film) =

1972 film by George C. Scott

- Theatrical release poster
- Directed by: George C. Scott
- Written by: Philip Friedman; Dan Kleinman
- Produced by: Fred Weintraub
- Starring: George C. Scott; Martin Sheen; Richard Basehart; Barnard Hughes
- Cinematography: Fred J. Koenekamp
- Edited by: Michael Kahn
- Music by: Lalo Schifrin
- Production companies: Getty and Fromkess Corp.
- Distributed by: Warner Bros. Pictures
- Release date: November 22, 1972
- Running time: 100 minutes
- Country: United States
- Language: English

Rage is a 1972 American environmental thriller film directed by George C. Scott in his feature directorial debut, and starring Scott, Richard Basehart, Martin Sheen, and Barnard Hughes. The plot, which is inspired by the 1968 Dugway sheep incident, follows a rancher and his family who are fatally exposed to a military lab's poison gas.

The film was released by Warner Bros. Pictures on November 22, 1972. It received mixed reviews.

== Plot ==
When Wyoming sheep rancher Dan Logan and his son Chris go camping, the boy decides to sleep outside their tent. In the morning, he is unconscious and bleeding from his nose. As Dan gathers his limp body, he notices several of his sheep seem dead with similar bleeding. At a nearby hospital, Dan is bewildered to be subjected to tests by Dr. Holliford. His only concern is his son.

Dan's personal physician, Dr. Caldwell, arrives and is deferential to Drs. Holliford and Spencer, despite several concerns about their treatments. Holliford is a US Army Major who realizes the Logans were accidentally exposed to a deadly, aerially-dispersed nerve gas called MX-3. Because Chris slept in the open air, his exposure was more severe. Holliford estimates Dan has a week to live.

Spencer and Holliford maintain the pretense of treating the Logans while secretly studying the toxin's effects on their bodies. The Army realizes the gas was leaked by an obsolete aircraft and that the Logans were probably the only humans exposed. They strategize about the best way to minimize the damage of their mistake.

Chris soon dies, but the hospital staff keeps telling Dan his son is fine. Spencer explains the situation to Caldwell, who agrees to shield Dan from the truth. Holliford keeps Dan sedated for as long as possible and assigns an orderly to guard him. Chris is autopsied, and Dan slips out of his room to search for his son. He finds him in the morgue.

Dan escapes the hospital and buys a rifle. He goes to Spencer's home and holds him at gunpoint to find out the truth about his son. Dan buys dynamite from his usual supplier, who assumes he is clearing rock slides. He then heads to the company that makes the nerve agent. He kills a guard and plants dynamite around the building. He kills a responding police officer before blowing up the building.

Dan kidnaps a stranger at gunpoint and forces him to drive to the military base. He kills a guard and rams the barrier before letting the stranger go. The symptoms of the nerve agent prevent Dan from making much progress inside the base. He starts convulsing in a field. Soldiers gather around him and watch his death throes. Major Holliford arrives and draws blood from Dan's body. The film concludes the next morning as soldiers play softball on the field where Dan died.

== Cast ==
- George C. Scott as Dan Logan
- Richard Basehart as Dr. Caldwell
- Martin Sheen as Major Holliford
- Barnard Hughes as Dr. Spencer
- Nicolas Beauvy as Chris Logan
- Paul Stevens as Colonel William Franklin
- Stephen Young as Major Reintz
- Kenneth Tobey as Colonel Alan Nickerson
- Robert Walden as Dr. Tom Janeway
- William Jordan as Major Cooper
- Dabbs Greer as Dr. Thompson
- John Dierkes as Bill Parker
- Bette Henritze as Sarah Parker
- Lou Frizzell as Spike Boynton
- Ed Lauter as Simpson
- Terry Wilson as Trucker

== Background ==
The Dugway sheep incident in March 1968 inspired the film's premise. During various test dispersals of the nerve agent VX over the Dugway Proving Ground, an F-4 Phantom leaked some of its payload over a herd of sheep in Utah's Skull Valley. The accident resulted in the death of as many as 6,000 sheep. Dugway was a test site for various experimental warfare tactics like the bat bomb. The rancher who lost his sheep successfully sued the government for restitution.

NBC News' "First Tuesday" aired a segment on the accident on February 4, 1969. It caused a public backlash to American chemical weapons research that was reflected in works like The Andromeda Strain. The Dugway sheep incident also inspired Stephen King's The Stand and the "Three Dead Cows at Makapuu" episodes of Hawaii Five-O.

== Production ==
Fred Weintraub told the San Francisco Chronicle that Philip Friedman and Dan Kleinman approached him with a script based on the Dugway incident. They had fictionalized it to include poisoned humans, which was never a verified outcome of the accident. In their treatment, the gas has damaged the rancher's brain, causing the disproportionate reaction to the Army's secrecy about his son's death. When Weintraub showed the script to Scott, the actor agreed to the project and asked to direct it. Weintraub was enthusiastic about the idea since Scott had recently won the Oscar for Patton (1970) and had also won an Emmy for directing The Andersonville Trial (1971).

The film was shot entirely in Arizona, much of it on a Nogales ranch once owned by actor Stewart Granger.

== Reception ==
In The New York Times, Vincent Canby described the film as "a bit schizoid. What it says and what it looks like don't have much in common." He argued that the film generates sympathy for the supposed villains of the piece because of the rancher's sadistic rampage. The Washington Post concurred, "the first half of the movie generates some tangible suspense and human interest...but it goes resolutely, fatalistically downhill, discarding the element it can spare the least—the viewer's willingness to identify with the hero."

Gene Siskel of the Chicago Tribune gave the film two stars out of four and wrote, "As good an actor as he is, and 'Rage' is a decent example of his strength, Scott is a dismal director. The film also includes would-be arty slow-motion shots of coffee being thrown on a campfire, sedatives being handed to a hospital patient, and a cat jumping on a sofa. None of them make any sense except as errors by a fledgling director." Roger Ebert praised Scott's acting, "It’s commonplace by now to say what a fine movie actor Scott is, but it’s true. His performance is the best thing in 'Rage,' and the most consistent."

Charles Champlin of the Los Angeles Times was positive, calling it "entertainment with a message, and a very striking performance by Scott on both ends of the camera." Arthur D. Murphy of Variety called it "a sluggish, tired and tiring melodrama" which "just doesn't work."

Quentin Tarantino called Rage one of his favorite Martin Sheen performances, "He is the face of banal evil".
