= Tino Ceberano =

American martial artist

- Born: Constantino Ceberano; 24 September 1941 (age 84); Hawaii, USA
- Style: Gōjū-ryū Karate
- Teacher: Gōgen Yamaguchi
- Rank: 9th dan hanshi in Gōjū-ryū

Other information
- Notable students: Bob Jones, Richard Norton

Constantino 'Tino' Ceberano OAM (born 24 September 1941), commonly referred to as Hanshi Ceberano, is a karate master who is a key figure in Australian martial arts history. He is a direct student of Gōju Kai karate founder Gōgen Yamaguchi (1909–1989). A native of Hawaii, Ceberano moved to Australia in 1966 at Yamaguchi's request, to establish Gōju Kai karate there.

== Early life ==
Ceberano was born on the island of Kauai, Hawaii, 24 September 1941. His father was a Filipino migrant who came to Hawaii as a professional boxer - the original spelling of his surname was Sobirano, but it was phonetically transcribed as Ceberano upon arrival. His mother was also a Filipino migrant. As a youth, Ceberano studied boxing and judo, attaining black belt ranking in the latter. Ceberano first learned karate, under the name of kempo, from a Korean War veteran. In a later interview, Ceberano said, "I was immediately attracted to karate's discipline, its intricate breathing methods, and the principles of mutual respect. This applied in the dojo, where the opponent or classmate was given equal respect—regardless of size, strength, or ability. And outside the dojo, the same principle was to be applied, regardless of the other man's race, color, or creed. I wasn't long in karate before I noticed all the usual physical benefits, but it was my mental improvement that really impressed me" (Brennan, 1974, pp. 42–43).

In 1958, Ceberano's family left Kauai to settle in Honolulu. Ceberano's first Gōju Kai instructors were Anton Navas and Masaichi Oshiro. Ceberano joined the United States Marine Corps in mid-1959. Military life, and the associated travel, made continuity of training difficult, but Ceberano persisted, and attained 1st dan ranking in Gōju Kai karate under Oshiro in 1963.

== Life in Australia ==
At Yamaguchi's request, Ceberano left Hawaii and moved to Melbourne in October 1966 to help establish Gōju Kai karate in Australia. Ceberano was ranked 3rd dan at the time. Ceberano subsequently established a Gōju Kai karate dojo at Monash University. Mervyn Oakley had previously established a Gōju Kai dojo in New South Wales in 1963, and travelled to Melbourne to assist.

In 1989, following Yamaguchi's death, a meeting of senior Gōju Kai officials authorised Ceberano to form his own organisation: the International Gōju Karatedo (IGK). Ceberano attained 7th dan ranking & kyoshi title in 1992. He played the role of Lau in Under the Gun (1995). Ceberano was appointed to the Australasian Sokeship Council in 2007, and currently holds the rank of 9th dan, which was awarded in 2008. Ceberano was awarded the Medal of the Order of Australia in 2019 as part of the Queen's Birthday Honours

== Personal life ==
Ceberano married Australian wife Cherie (née Joyce) in Melbourne in 1963. They had three children, Paul (a karateka who now runs the Ceberano Martial Arts Academy), Philip (a musician) and Catherine, a pop singer
