= Cynthia Rothrock =

American actress and martial artist

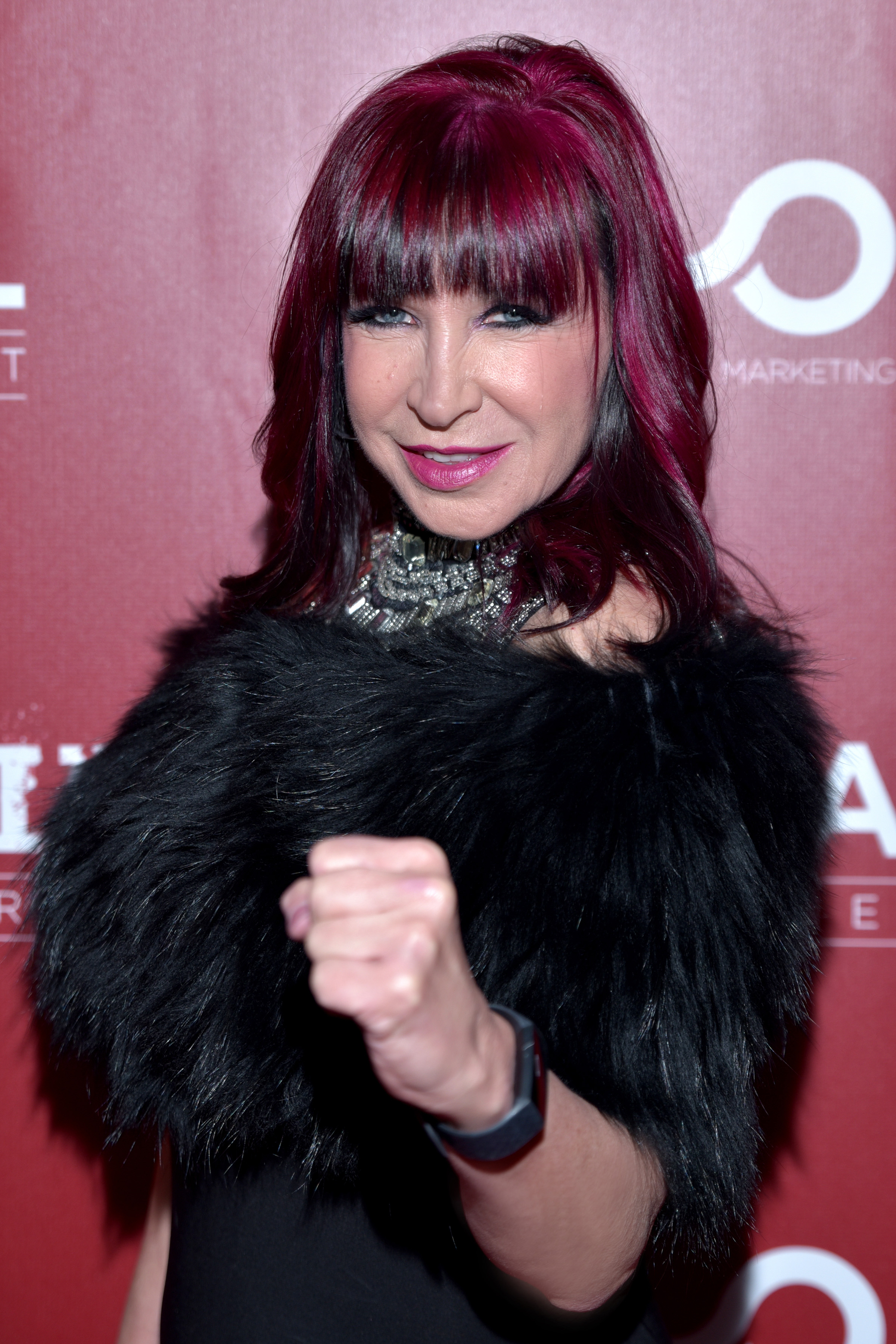
- Rothrock in 2018
- Born: Wilmington, Delaware, U.S.
- Other names: Foo Lok Law
- Rank: 8th Degree Black Belt in Tang Soo Do; Black Belt in Taekwondo; Black belt in Karate; Black Belt in Eagle Claw; Black Belt in Wu Shu; Black Belt in Northern Shaolin; Black Belt in Pai Lum Tao Kung Fu
- Years active: 1985–2004; 2011–present

Other information
- Occupation: Film actress Martial arts instructor
- Website: cynthiarothrockofficial.com

Foo Lok Law
- Traditional Chinese: 羅芙洛
- Simplified Chinese: 罗芙洛
Transcriptions
Standard Mandarin
- Hanyu Pinyin: Luó Fúluò
Yue: Cantonese
- Yale Romanization: Lòh Fùh-lok
- Jyutping: Lo^{4} Fu^{4} Lok^{3}
- IPA: [lɔ˩ fu˩lɔk̚˧]

Cynthia Rothrock (born March 8, 1957) is an American martial artist and actress best known for her martial arts films. She holds black belt rankings in seven styles of martial arts and was a high-level competitor in martial arts before becoming an actress. In 2014, she was inducted into the International Sports Hall of Fame. In 2016, Martial Arts History Museum bestowed Rothrock the official title of The Queen of Martial Arts.

Rothrock made her acting debut in the Hong Kong action film Yes, Madam (1985), alongside Michelle Yeoh. She went on to star in several Hong Kong action films, such as Millionaires Express, The Magic Crystal, Righting Wrongs (all 1986), No Retreat, No Surrender 2 (1987), and The Inspector Wears Skirts (1988).

In the 1990s, Rothrock co-starred with Richard Norton in five martial arts films: China O'Brien, China O'Brien II, Lady Dragon, Rage and Honor and Rage and Honor II. She also starred in Martial Law, and its sequel, Martial Law 2: Undercover (both 1991), as well as Tiger Claws (1991), Irresistible Force, Undefeatable (both 1993), and Fast Getaway II (1994).

== Early life ==
Rothrock grew up in Scranton, Pennsylvania, and started taking martial arts lessons at the age of 13.

== Career ==
=== Martial arts ===
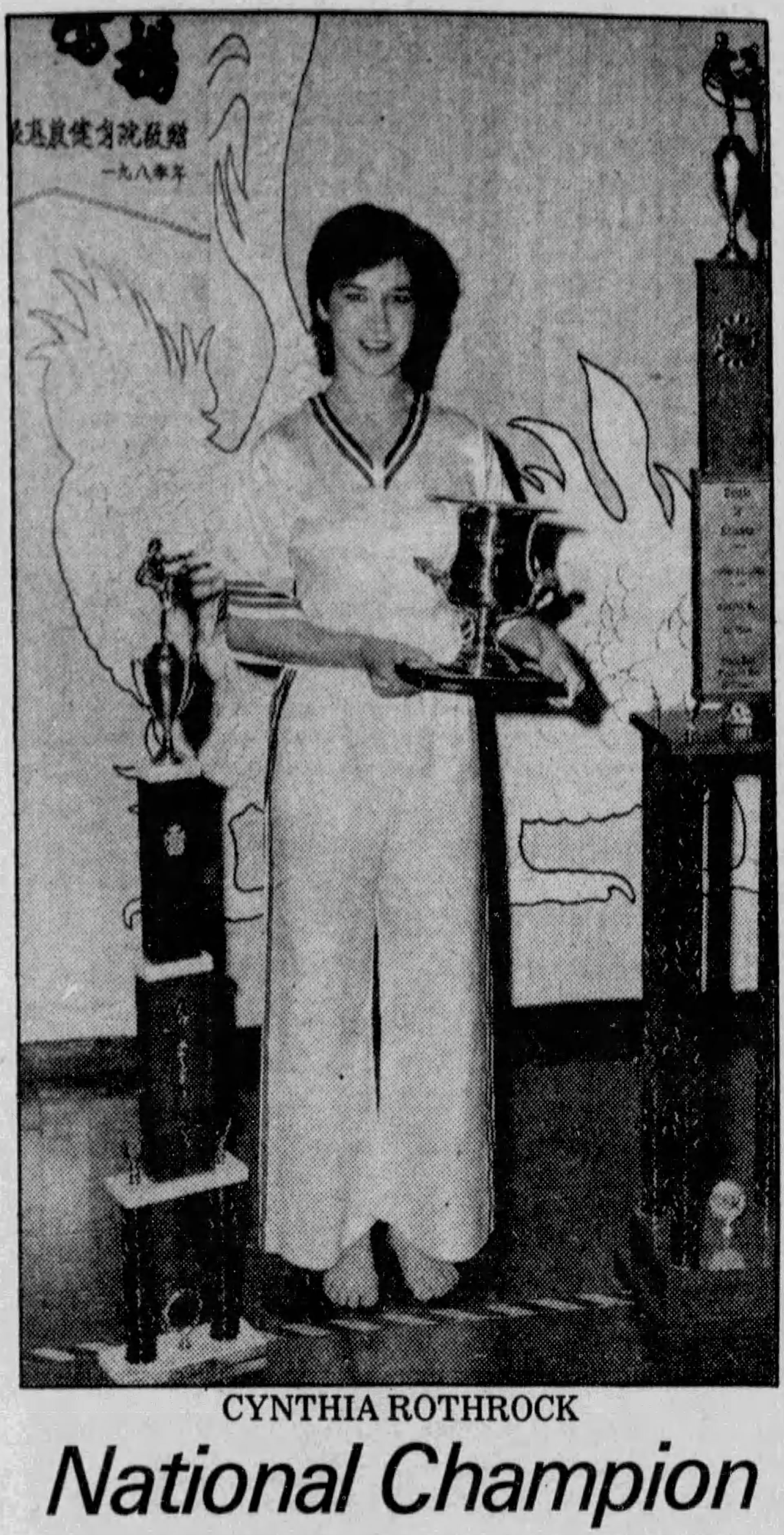
Newspaper clipping, October 30, 1981

Rothrock was World Champion in forms and weapons five times between 1981 and 1985. These categories are not combat-oriented, being displays of fluidity of movement rather than fighting, and are not segregated into male and female categories but fully open to both sexes.

Rothrock took first place in forms 32 times and first place in weapons 12 times in her first 38 tournaments, including competing in "Men's Forms" three out of four times, as there was no Women's Division. She was "Grand Master" of five tournaments and came in first place in 4 out of 5 fighting events.

Rothrock holds seven black belts and sashes in multiple Far Eastern martial disciplines, including Tang Soo Do, Taekwondo (Korean), Eagle Claw (Chinese), Wushu, Northern Shaolin, Ng Ying Kungfu (Chinese: 五形功夫) and Pai Lum White Dragon Kung Fu. She received her 6th degree black belt in Tang Soo Do Moo Duk Kwan in 2006. She was tested by Grand Master Robert Kovaleski, 9th Dan and chair of the I.T.M.A., and was later promoted by him to 7th degree black belt in 2011 and 8th degree black belt in 2015. She is a martial arts instructor and her favorite weapons are the hook swords.

In 1983, Rothrock was inducted into the Black Belt Magazine Hall of Fame as "Female Competitor of the Year." She was the first woman to appear on the cover of a martial arts magazine, and in 1986, co-authored a book with George Chung titled, Advanced Dynamic Kicks. In 2014, she was honored with the Legacy Award at the Urban Action Showcase & Expo at HBO. In 2016, she was inducted into the International Sports Hall of Fame by Arnold Schwarzenegger and Dr. Robert Goldman. In 2022, Rothrock received the Martial Arts SuperShow "Lifetime Achievement Award" in Las Vegas. Past recipients have included Chuck Norris, Fumio Demura, Benny “The Jet” Urquidez and former Navy SEAL Marcus Luttrell, among others.

Rothrock made history by becoming the inaugural woman to grace the cover of Karate Illustrated (August 1981) and holds the distinction of being the first woman featured on the cover three times in the magazine's history.

In March 2024, Black Belt Magazine named Rothrock in its list of "The Most Influential Women Martial Artists on the Planet."

=== Acting ===
In 1983, while Rothrock was on Ernie Reyes' West Coast Demonstration Team, she was discovered by Golden Harvest in Los Angeles, California. It was two years later that she made her first martial arts movie for them, Yes, Madam (also known as Police Assassins or In the Line of Duty Part 2), which also starred Michelle Yeoh. It proved to be a box office success. Rothrock ended up staying in Hong Kong until 1988 doing seven films there. Possibly her first American film was 24 Hours to Midnight, a Leo Fong-directed film, which also starred Stack Pierce and Bernie Pock (son of actress Nancy Kwan).

Rothrock became one of the few Western performers to achieve genuine stardom in the local Hong Kong film industry before achieving success in their own country. She was credited as 羅芙洛 ("Fu Lok Law" or "Foo Lok Law") in many Hong Kong movies. Producer Pierre David initiated Rothrock's move to the American turf. David offered her a co-starring role with Chad McQueen in Martial Law, Rothrock's first American production. For the next 10 years, she led a successful career in action movies. Her films include China O'Brien and China O'Brien II, Guardian Angel, Honor & Glory, No Retreat, No Surrender 2 and Prince of the Sun, amongst a roster of thirty films.

Rothrock appeared as Bertha Jo in the 1997 television film The Dukes of Hazzard: Reunion!

Rothrock did voice work on the animated series Eek the Cat, which premiered in September 1992.

Rothrock made an appearance in the television series Hercules: The Legendary Journeys, playing Hera's second Enforcer in the 1996 episode, "Not Fade Away."

After starring in the 2004 film Xtreme Fighter (a.k.a. Sci-Fighter), where she played "Sally Kirk/The White Dragon," Rothrock retired from acting to teach private martial arts lessons at her martial arts studio in Studio City, California. She returned to acting for the role as Nanna in the 2012 Christmas family film Santa's Summer House, alongside British martial artist and actor Gary Daniels.

In 2014, Rothrock starred in the action movie Mercenaries, alongside Kristanna Loken, Brigitte Nielsen, Vivica A. Fox and Zoë Bell.

In 2023, Rothrock began production on the movie Black Creek, in which she took on multiple roles. She not only produced it, but also co-wrote the script and stars as the lead. This dark and gritty dystopian Western combines elements of action and martial arts, featuring a powerful female protagonist played by Rothrock herself. Joining her are familiar faces from her previous Robert Clouse film China O'Brien, including Richard Norton and Keith Cooke. Black Creek was set for release in 2024, and will have an accompanying graphic novel.

== Filmography ==
Year	English title		Role	Notes	Ref.
Year	International	Philippines	Role	Notes	Ref.
1985	Yes, Madam	The Super Cops	Senior Inspector Carrie Morris	Original title: 皇家師姐 / a.k.a. Police Assassins	
1985	24 Hours to Midnight		Devon Grady		
1985	Defend Yourself			a.k.a. Sybervision	
1986	Millionaires Express	China Warriors	Mountain Bandit	Chinese: 富貴列車 / a.k.a. Shanghai Express	
1986	The Magic Crystal	Fight to Win	Cindy Morgan	Original title: 魔翡翠	
1986	Righting Wrongs	Fight to Win II	Senior Inspector Cindy Si	Original title: 執法先鋒 a.k.a. Above the Law	
1987	Fight to Win		Sensei Lauren	a.k.a. Eyes of the Dragon a.k.a. Dangerous Passages	
1987	No Retreat, No Surrender 2	Raging Thunder	Terry	a.k.a. No Retreat, No Surrender II: Raging Thunder a.k.a. Karate Tiger 2	
1988	The Inspector Wears Skirts	Lady Enforcer	Madam Law	Original title: 霸王花 a.k.a. Top Squad	
1988	Jungle Heat			Original title: Rapid Fire	
1989	The Blonde Fury	American Fighter	Cindy	Original title: 師姐大晒 a.k.a. Above the Law II: Blond Fury a.k.a. Righting Wrongs II: Blond Fury	
1989	City Cops		Inspector Cindy	Original title: 妙探雙龍 a.k.a. Beyond the Law a.k.a. Free Fighter	
1990	Prince of the Sun		Bencheuk	Original title: 太陽之子 / Original title: Tai yang zhi zi	
1990	Deadliest Art: Best of the Martial Arts Films		Herself (archive footage)	Documentary	
1990	China O'Brien		Officer Lori "China" O'Brien		
1990	China O'Brien II		Sheriff Lori "China" O'Brien		
1990	Triple Cross		Nancy Bolan	Released as Angel of Fury in North America	
1991	Martial Law		Officer Billie Blake		
1991	Fast Getaway	Super Outlaws	Lilly		
1991	Martial Law 2: Undercover		Billie Blake	a.k.a. Karate Cop	
1991	Tiger Claws		Detective Linda Masterson		
1992
1992	Lady Dragon		Kathy Galagher		
1992	Rage and Honor		Kris Fairfield		
1992	Honor and Glory	Naked Fists	Tracey Pride	Original title: Zong heng tian xia	
1993	Rage and Honor II: Hostile Takeover		Kris Fairfield		
1993	Irresistible Force		Charlotte Heller		
1993	Angel of Fury	Angel of Fury	Susan "The Golden Angel" Morgan	Released as Lady Dragon 2 in North America	
1993	Undefeatable		Kristi Jones	Original title: 摧花狂魔 a.k.a. Bloody Mary Killer: Infamous for its final fight scene, which became an internet sensation circa 2006.	
1994	Fast Getaway II		Lilly		
1994	Guardian Angel		Kristine McKay		
1995	Fatal Passion		Laurel		
1996	Eye for an Eye		Tina		
1996	Tiger Claws II		Detective Linda Masterson		
1996	Hercules: The Legendary Journeys		Enforcer II	Episode "Not Fade Away"	
1996	Sworn to Justice	Blond Justice	Janna		
1996	Checkmate				
1996	The Encyclopedia of Martial Arts-Martial Combat				
1996	American Tigers		Herself		
1997	Night Vision		Kristin O'Connor		
1997	The Dukes of Hazzard: Reunion!		Bertha Jo		
1997	Deep Cover		FBI Special Agent Kate Mason		
1998	The Hostage				
1999	Tiger Claws 3		Detective Linda Masterson		
2000	Manhattan Chase		Nancy		
2001	Ren she tou du				
2001	Redemption		Erin Murphy		
2002	Outside the Law		Julie Cosgrove		
2004	Xtreme Fighter	Sci-Fighter	Sally "The White Dragon" Kirk		
2007	Bala Perdida	Lost Bullet	Cynthia		
2012	Santa's Summer House		Nanna		
2013	Badass Showdown		Ivy		
2014	Mercenaries		CIA Agent Mona Kendall		
2014	Rogue Space: The Adventures of Saber Raine				
2015	The Martial Arts Kid		Cindy		
2016	Showdown in Manila		Haines		
2016	Beyond the Game				
2016	Asian Ghost Story		The Narrator (voice)		
2016	Fists of Fury		Herself - Host		
2017	Star Raiders: The Adventures of Saber Raine		Kandra Syn		
2017	A Doggone Hollywood		Mom in Car		
2017	Death Fighter		Valerie		
2018	Fury of the Fist and the Golden Fleece		Counter Attendant		
2018	Cool Cat Kids Superhero		Momma Cat (voice)		
2018	B-Team		General Rothrock (voice)		
2018	Paying Mr. McGetty		Herself		
2021	Vendetta Vette		LaRue		
2021	Cool Cat Saves the Kids (Director's Cut)		Momma Cat (voice)	Archive footage from Cool Cat Kids Superhero	
2021	Diary of a Lunatic		Mrs. Cloudover		
2021	New York Ninja		Detective Janet Flores (voice)		
2022	Prey of Wrath		Brenda Sands		
2024	The Last Kumite		Julie Jackson		
2024	Black Creek		Rose Jennings		
(TBC)	No Way Back		Angela O'Leary		
(TBC)	Anadellia Rises		Priscilla Kasper		

== Bibliography ==
- Schubart, Rikke (2014). "6. Failed Female Hero? 'Queen of Martial Arts' Cynthia Rothrock". Super Bitches and Action Babes: The Female Hero in Popular Cinema, 1970–2006. Jefferson, NC: McFarland & Company. ISBN 9780786482849. OCLC 607648951.

== Awards ==
- Genoa, October 5, 2016: Rothrock was awarded the title of "Knight of Sport" by the National Order Knights of Sport, with the support of ASI.
- In 2014, Rothrock was inducted into the International Sports Hall of Fame.
