= The Rejection Show =

The Rejection Show is a comedic variety show that features the rejected or cut material of writers, comedians, cartoonists, artists, and others, who display their creative "failures" live on stage.

The Rejection Show was created by comedian and writer Jon Friedman (producer, host) in the summer of 2003 after a string of his own personal and creative rejections left him wanting to create a forum for such works. The show features a variety of material that is both good and bad, from stories of personal heartbreak to rejected sketches from Saturday Night Live to rejected cartoons from The New Yorker.

Material from The Rejection Show was published in book form in 2009 by Villard, titled Rejected: Tales of the Failed, Dumped and Cancelled.
