= The New Adventures of Robin Hood =

American-French television series

- Created by: Tom Kuhn; Fred Weintraub; Sandra Weintraub
- Starring: Matthew Porretta; John Bradley; Anna Galvin; Barbara Griffin; Martyn Ellis; Richard Ashton; Hakim Alston; Andrew Bicknell; Christie Lee Woods
- Countries of origin: France; United States
- No. of seasons: 4
- No. of episodes: 52

Production
- Executive producers: Tom Kuhn; Fred Weintraub
- Running time: 45 mins
- Production companies: Tarnview Limited; Dune Productions; M6; Warner Bros. International Television

Original release
- Network: TNT (seasons 1–2); Syndication (seasons 3–4)
- Release: January 13, 1997 – December 13, 1999

The New Adventures of Robin Hood is an action adventure television series that premiered on January 13, 1997, on TNT. The show was based on the legend of Robin Hood, the English folk hero, and was filmed in Vilnius, Lithuania. It was produced and distributed by Dune Productions, M6, and Warner Bros. International.

The tone of the series resembled its contemporaries Hercules: The Legendary Journeys and Xena: Warrior Princess. The premiere episode aired immediately after an episode of WCW Monday Nitro. A unique promotional effort took place between the two, with the Nitro main event—Hulk Hogan vs The Giant—not beginning until two minutes before the show ended, then continuing and being broadcast during portions of commercial breaks.

The New Adventures of Robin Hood aired for a total of four seasons with fifty-two episodes airing over a span of two calendar years. The first two seasons aired on TNT, and the series moved to first-run syndication for the final two.

== Plot ==
Following the adventures of the legendary outlaw hero and his team, this series tells all new tales pitting Robin, Little John, Marion, and Tuck against the forces of oppression and greed. Similar to other fantasy-action shows at the time, such as Hercules: The Legendary Journeys and The Adventures of Sinbad, this version incorporates fantasy elements into the Robin Hood mythos, the most notable addition being the wizard Olwyn, who acts as a mentor to Robin. Among the recurring elements are enchanted weapons ("Robin and the Golden Arrow", "Devil's Bride"), monsters ("Nightmare of the Magic Castle", "Return of the Giant"), and time travel ("Return to Camelot", "The Time Machine").

== Cast ==
- Robin Hood – Matthew Porretta (Note: Porretta previously had the role of Will Scarlett O'Hara in the 1993 satire comedy, Robin Hood: Men in Tights.) (seasons 1–2); John Bradley (seasons 3–4)
- Lady Marion Fitzwalter – Anna Galvin (season 1); Barbara Griffin (seasons 2–4)
- Little John – Richard Ashton
- Friar Tuck – Martyn Ellis
- Olwyn – Christopher Lee
- Kemal – Hakim Alston
- Prince John – Andrew Bicknell
- Rowena – Christie Lee Woods
- Marjorie – Hélène Cardona
- Ariel Glister – Alison Armitage

== Episodes ==
=== Season 1 (1997, TNT) ===
No. overall	No. in season	Title	Directed by	Written by	Original release date
1	1	"Rage of the Mongols"	Dimitri Logothetis	Lee Watters	January 13, 1997
A village under siege from Mongol warriors turns to Robin and the team to aid them in finally defeating the raiders and their leader Kobak (Keith Cooke), but the matter is complicated by the refusal for help from the village elders.
2	2	"Attack of the Vikings"	Harley Cokeliss	Robert Gunn & Sandra Weintraub	January 20, 1997
Robin must rescue both himself and his archenemy when he and Prince John are kidnapped by Vikings.
3	3	"Robin and the Golden Arrow"	Joe Coppoletta	Sandra Weintraub	January 27, 1997
When Captain Delouche, a knight with magic armor that protects him from harm, begins abducting young women (one to be his bride, the other as a sacrifice to the Celtic war goddess, Maka), Robin must retrieve the one weapon that can penetrate the armor, a golden arrow. The only obstacle? It's in Prince John's castle.
4	4	"A Race Against Death"	Terry Marcel	Sandra Weintraub	February 3, 1997
Robin enters a deadly contest to keep the granddaughter of an old friend from marrying Prince John's minion, Sir Gilbert.
5	5	"A Price on His Soul"	Joe Coppoletta	Katie Ryan	February 10, 1997
The immortal scientist Baragon (Simon Merrells) seeks to end his cycle of feeding by taking Robin's life force.
6	6	"Marion to the Rescue"	Keith Washington	Larry Felix Jr.	February 17, 1997
Marion must save both her cousin and teammates from her wicked sister-in-law, a practicing witch who plans to marry the young girl off to a fellow corrupt noble.
7	7	"The Legend of Olwyn"	Terry Marcel	Katherine Ashworth	February 24, 1997
Robin is knocked unconscious by a young copycat and flashbacks reveal how he came to be the King of Thieves.
8	8	"Witches of the Abbey"	Terry Marcel	Susan Graham	March 3, 1997
Little John is kidnapped by a coven of evil witches (one of whom is Robin's aunt Alice) to be their new servant, and Robin fakes his death to save his best friend.
9	9	"The Arabian Knight"	Juan A. Mas	Sandra Weintraub	March 10, 1997
An evil warrior from the Middle East seeks to make Marion part of his harem.
10	10	"The Birthday Trap"	Terry Marcel	Muriel Morrissey	March 17, 1997
Robin must save his stepmother's birthday party from thieves.
11	11	"Miracle at Avalon"	Roger Tucker	Claudia Lonow & Larry Felix Jr.	March 24, 1997
The team must get the daughter of the God of Healing to her mother before her twenty-first birthday, or else those she's saved will die from old wounds she healed, including Robin and Tuck's. But the evil Sir Guy of Gisborne (Greg Porretta) seeks to prevent their journey to finally rid himself of Robin, with help from the exiled Avalonian witch, Mordrell.
12	12	"Dragon from the Sky"	Terry Marcel	Margaret Sachs	March 31, 1997
Marion befriends and protects an alien.
13	13	"Nightmare of the Magic Castle"	Dimitri Logothetis	Sandra Weintraub & Larry Felix Jr.	April 7, 1997
To prevent a warlock from releasing a monster, Robin must learn the secrets of the beast's domain.

=== Season 2 (1997, TNT) ===
No. overall	No. in season	Title	Directed by	Written by	Original release date
14	1	"The Ultimate Army"	Terry Marcel	Larry Felix Jr.	July 14, 1997
Little John joins an army to prove himself to the world, not knowing it belongs to the evil Lord Malice. Making the situation worse is that Malice has also recruited Robin's former fighting instructor (Frank Porretta) to train his army.
15	2	"The Legion"	Terry Marcel	David Sloan	July 21, 1997
With help from Mortiana, Prince John resurrects three members of Alexander the Great's army to help him kill Robin...in exchange for a year of his life.
16	3	"The Devil's Bride"	Harley Cokeliss	Martin Ensbury	July 28, 1997
Marion is kidnapped by Groliet (Robert Addie), an evil cult leader and former knight in the employ of Robin's father, to be the bride of his master, the dark god Bailor. To save Marion and defeat Bailor, Robin must find a unicorn horn, the one item that can kill Bailor.
17	4	"The Prey"	Joe Coppoletta	David Sloan & Cornelia Gink	August 9, 1997
After Robin and the team rob his illegal casino, the evil Lord Simon challenges three hunters in his debt to hunt the ultimate prey: Robin Hood.
18	5	"Bombs Away"	Joe Coppoletta	David Sloan	August 23, 1997
Sir Guy hires Master Ika to plant bomb traps for the rest of the team, while he goes after Marion.
19	6	"The Road to Royston"	Terry Bedford	Mike Ashworth	August 30, 1997
Robin helps a young woman save her sister from a forced marriage.
20	7	"The Mystery of Druid's Grove"	Harley Cokeliss	Sandra Weintraub	September 6, 1997
The team must save Kemal and his bride Kadija from a slave trader...who also happens to be an old enemy of Marion's.
21	8	"The Legend of the Amazons"	Michele Ohayon	Cornelia Gink & Sandra Weintraub	September 27, 1997
The team helps a group of Amazons find a magic staff before an evil sultan does.
22	9	"Outlaw Express"	Adrian Carr	David Sloan	October 4, 1997
Robin poses as his evil look-a-like in order to recapture other escaped prisoners.
23	10	"The Sceptre"	Terry Bedford	Sandra Weintraub & Chip Graham	October 11, 1997
Robin's team and Prince John's men work together when an evil sorcerer gets a hold of Merlin's sceptre, and uses it to raise an army of the dead.
24	11	"Justice for All"	Joe Coppoletta	David Sloan & Sandra Weintraub	October 25, 1997
A fanatical priest endangers the Druids.
25	12	"Percy's Ghost"	Vicangelo Bulluck	Leslie Woody	November 1, 1997
Robin and his team must get four nobles to a secret meeting regarding an alliance against Prince John.
26	13	"Your Land is My Land"	Andy Armstrong	Steve Barnett	November 8, 1997
An evil Norman lord terrorizes Saxon farmers into giving him their land, until Robin and the team show up.

=== Season Three (1998, syndication) ===
27. First Love: Robin's former fiancée seeks the outlaw hero's help in rescuing her husband.

28. The Haunted Castle: An investigation into a man and his daughter's disappearance leads to the team confronting their own fears.

29. The Giant King: When the son of old friend falls ill, Robin and the team seek out the last of a race of Irish giants with healing breath. But when the young man is cured, he becomes a tyrant.

30. Sword of the Samurai: Robin teams up with an aspiring samurai to retrieve a sword from the evil Count Frederick.

31. Robinville: A visit to a celebration in Robin's honor turns chaotic when the son of the man Robin freed the town from seeks revenge.

32. Vanishing Act: When Marion, and later Little John's sister Ingrid, go missing, Robin and Little John get help from a hermit to find them.

33. The Hunter: In a Predator-style episode, Rowena accidentally summons a creature who must collect seven warriors for a sacrifice that will enhance his power.

34. A Date with Destiny: Robin is sent back fifteen years and mistakenly alters history.

35. Orphans: Robin must rescue a young boy from an evil knight who seeks to overthrow his cousin, a queen.

36. The Assassin: Robin and the team must keep three nobles safe from a shapeshifting assassin.

37. Body and Soul: Robin dies in action before his time and must occupy another body while a new one is being created.

38. Assault on Castle Dundeen: The team helps a young lord protect his castle from his evil uncle.

39. The Auction: An auction held by Tuck is put on hold when Robin learns his father may still be alive. Or is he?

=== Season Four (1999, syndication) ===
40. Ringside Murder: Tuck is framed for the murder of a lord and the team must clear his name.

41. Heroes: The Sheriff has a look-a-like pose as Robin while the real one is sent back in time, and placed in the body of a treacherous ancestor.

42. Godiva: An evil sorceress seeks revenge on Robin.

43. Raven's Peak: The team must help a man hide when he's accused of murder.

44. Black Rose: An exiled Amazon named Black Rose plans to assassinate Queen Eleanor.

45. The Running Bride: Robin must escort a princess to her wedding while keeping her safe from an evil duke and earl.

46. The Prison: Marion is taken hostage by prisoners who plan to unleash a plague on England.

47. The Rebellion: Olivia (from "First Love") is taken by the evil Lord Tumble after her husband is killed.

48. Return to Camelot: Merlin transports Robin to the past to train a young King Arthur.

49. The Hanged Man: In a plot similar to The Manchurian Candidate, The Sheriff uses a mad scientist to brainwash either Marion, Little John, or Tuck to kill Robin.

50. The Time Machine: A teenager named Elvis travels back to Nottingham via his father's time machine, only to have it stolen by raiders

51. Day After Day: Robin must free his team and a whole village when an evil warlock curses the area to relive the same day over and over until the woman he obsesses over agrees to marry him.

52. Return of the Giant: A lord uses a spell to summon a giant to kidnap the woman who rejected his proposal.

== Home media ==
The first season of this show was released on DVD on June 1, 2010, and is sold exclusively on as a manufacture-on-demand product.

== See also ==
- List of films and television series featuring Robin Hood
