= Rikke Schubart =

Danish author and film scholar (born 1966)

Rikke Schubart (born November 16, 1966) is a Danish author and film scholar, who teaches at Institute for the Study of Culture at University of Southern Denmark in Odense, Denmark. Her research is on emotions, gender, and genre in film and television. Her work has focused on horror cinema, the action film, and the war film.

She made her literary debut in 1993 with I lyst og død: Fra Frankenstein til splatterfilm, an analysis of the horror genre in film and literature. She has since then written a number of academic books about horror and action films and about women in films. She also writes fiction.

Her latest English-language book, Super Bitches and Action Babes: The Female Hero in Popular Cinema, 1970-2006 (McFarland, 2007), has chapters on film stars such as Pam Grier, Sigourney Weaver, Meiko Kaji, Cynthia Rothrock and Milla Jovovich. Her latest anthology, (edited with A. Gjelsvik) is Eastwood’s Iwo Jima: Critical Engagements With Flags of Our Fathers and Letters from Iwo Jima (Columbia UP, 2013).

She has written a children's book, Prinsessen der brokkede sig hele tiden (2005) and a vampire novel, Bite (Bid, 2008), both published in Danish.

== Bibliography ==
- I lyst og død: Fra Frankenstein til splatterfilm (Borgens forlag, 1993)
- Verdens 25 bedste gyserfilm (Rosinante, 2001)
- Med vold og magt: Actionfilm fra Dirty Harry til The Matrix (Rosinante, 2002)
- Made in America: Tendenser i amerikansk film (Gads forlag, 2003)
- Femme Fatalities: Representations of Strong Women in the Media (ed. with A. Gjelsvik, Nordicom, 2004)
- Prinsessen der brokkede sig hele tiden (Høst og søn, 2005)
- Super Bitches and Action Babes: The Female Hero in Popular Cinema, 1970-2006 (McFarland Publishers, 2007)
- Bid a vampire novel (Politiken Forlag, 2008)
- Rikke Schubart, Tanja Thomas, Fabian Virchow, Debra White-Stanley, eds. War Isn’t Hell, It’s Entertainment: Essays on Visual Media and the Representation of Conflict (Jefferson: McFarland, 2009)
- Rikke Schubart and Anne Gjelsvik, eds. Eastwood’s Iwo Jima: Critical Engagements With Flags of Our Fathers and Letters from Iwo Jima (London: Wallflower Press/Columbia University Press, 2013)
