= Marshall Teague (actor) =

American actor (born 1953)

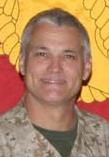
- Teague in 2006
- Born: April 16, 1953 (age 73); Newport, Tennessee, U.S.
- Occupation: Actor
- Years active: 1979–present

Marshall R. Teague (born April 16, 1953) is an American film and television actor known for his balance of starring roles with powerful supporting characters, allowing him to build a varied and pivotal body of work. He was born in Newport, Tennessee. He is of English, French, and Cherokee ancestry. At age nine, he spent time with relatives throughout Asia, where he began a passion for the martial arts training in Korean Kuk Sool Won Hapkido. He holds black belts in both Korean Hapkido and Tae Kwon Do. Marshall joined the U.S. Navy and served in Vietnam. While serving in the 6th Fleet, he won NATO heavyweight kickboxing championship. Upon retiring from military service, Marshall entered the sheriff's department in Shelby County, Tennessee (Memphis). While working undercover, he found acting lessons had become pivotal. In 1978, Marshall moved to Los Angeles, becoming a full-time actor.

His breakout role was as Jimmy Reno in the cult-classic movie Road House and for his recurring role on the 1990s science-fiction series Babylon 5 as Ta'Lon, a Narn soldier, and Nelson Drake. He also had several guest roles playing different characters on the TV series Walker, Texas Ranger.

Marshall has also appeared in The Rock (1996) and Armageddon (1998), both of which were directed by Michael Bay. He is the only actor to portray Lt. Black Jack Pershing in director John Milius' film Rough Riders and Eduard Shevardnadze, the Soviet Union minister of foreign affairs under Mikhail Gorbachev in director Sean McNamara's film Reagan.

Teague's TV guest-star appearances include Walker, Texas Ranger, where he has made memorable guest appearances as different characters. He was Walker's first nemesis in the pilot episode "One Riot, One Ranger", "Payback", "Codename: Dragonfly", "Last of a Breed Parts 1 & 2", "Fight or Die", "The Final Showdown 1 and 2" last TV film Trial by Fire. He appearanced on Babylon 5 as a human in the season-one episode "Infection" and made a guest appearance on the Babylon 5 spinoff Crusade as Captain Daniels in the episode "The Long Road". He was in three episodes of the science-fiction TV series Sliders as General Kronos and Sheriff Redfield.

He was a series regular on television in the soap opera Days of Our Lives as Leonard Stacy in 1984, as Brian McCord in 1985, and Colin Lawson in 1989. Also, he was in the soap operas Generations as Officer O’Reilly and The Bold and the Beautiful as Paul 2004. He starred as a series regular on the 1980s HBO series 1st & Ten as Mace Petty. He appeared in the action sci-fi (TV series) Super Force as Frank Stone and the military drama Pensacola: Wings of Gold as Major to Colonel Drayton. In the military drama Soldier of Fortune, Inc., he was David Drummer, and in the 2007 (telenovela) romance drama American Heiress, he was Richard Van Aiken.

Teague has made costarring appearances on several popular TV shows, including Columbo: Uneasy Lies the Crown, Stargate SG-1 episode "A Matter of Time", The Fall Guy (multiple episodes portraying a con man, mob enforcer, car thief), Automan, Knight Rider, Mama's Family episode "Blackbelt Mama", a love interest on Moonlighting episode "North by North DiPesto", She Spies, The A-Team, Quantum Leap episode "How the Tess Was Won", multiple episodes of MacGyver, Renegade, Hunter, Who's the Boss?, Tales from the Crypt, Star Trek: Deep Space Nine in the season-four episode "Hippocratic Oath", and on Star Trek: Voyager in the season-three episode "Distant Origin". He also portrayed the real-life love interest (Mike Stone) in Priscilla Presley's biographical story (TV movie) Elvis & Me as character Rick Colten.

In the video game industry, he is known as the voice of Krunk in the video game Crash Nitro Kart and as the model for Captain Elias Walker in Call of Duty: Ghosts.

== Filmography ==
- Topper (1979) (TV) – Man at Disco
- The Fall Guy (1981–1986) (TV) – Al Ponz
- The Phoenix (1981–1982) (TV) – Sheriff
- The Shadow Riders (1982) (TV) – Lieutenant Butler
- The Ambush Murders (1982) – Guard
- Knight Rider (1982–1986) – Armand
- Starflight: The Plane That Couldn't Land (1983) – Guard
- Mama's Family (1983–1990) (TV) – Chuck, Karate Instructor
- The A-Team (1983–1987) (TV) – Travis Mason
- Travis McGee (1983)(TV Movie) – Nicky Noyes
- Automan (1983–1984) (TV) – Ted
- Hunter (1984–1991) (TV) – Greg Avadon
- Who's the Boss? (1984–1992) (TV) – Bart
- 1st & Ten (1984) (TV) – Mason 'Mace' Petty (Season 1 regular)
- Crazy Like a Fox (1984–1986) (TV) –
- Moonlighting (1985–1989) (TV) – Chasing Man #1
- MacGyver (1985–1992) (TV) – Logan
- Vendetta (1986) – Paul Donahue
- Houston Knights (1987–1988) (TV) –
- The Bold and the Beautiful (1987) (TV) – Paul
- Werewolf (1987–1988) (TV) – Austin
- Elvis and Me (1988) – Rick Colton
- Original Sin (1989) – Richie Morgan
- Quantum Leap (1989–1993) (TV) – Wayne
- Road House (1989) – Jimmy Reno
- Tales from the Crypt (1989–1996) (TV) – Frank
- Baywatch (1989–2001) (TV) – Chief Clark
- Trained to Kill (1989) – Felix Brenner
- Chameleons (1989) – 'Turk'
- Sunset Beat (1990–1992) (TV) –
- Columbo: Uneasy Lies the Crown (1990) – Adam Evans
- Fire Birds (1990) – DEA Agent Doug Daniels
- Super Force (1990) (TV Movie) – Frank Stone Jr.
- Super Force (1990–1992) (TV) – Frank Stone Jr.
- P.S. I Luv U (1991–1992) (TV) – Agent Irwin
- Silk Stalkings (1991–1999) (TV) – Colonel Pike
- Love and Curses... And All That Jazz (1991) – Arthur
- Guardian Angel (1991)
- Renegade (1992–1997) (TV) – Sheriff
- Star Trek: Deep Space Nine (1993–1999) (TV) – Temo'Zuma
- Walker, Texas Ranger (1993–2001) (TV) – Orson Wade, Harper Ridland, Randy Shrader, Rudd Kilgore, Lieutenant Tracton and Emile Lavocat / Milos 'Moon' Lavocat
- Johnny Bago (1993) (TV) – Kenny
- No Child of Mine (1993) – George Young
- Rough Riders (1993)
- Babylon 5 (1994–1998) (TV) – Ta'Lon
- One West Waikiki (1994–1996) (TV) – Marty Essendal
- Motorcycle Gang (1994) – Kincaid
- Guardian Angel (1994) – Nick
- Surgical Strike (1994) – Major
- Star Trek: Voyager (1995–2001) (TV) – Haluk
- Sliders (1995–2000) (TV) – General Kronus / Redfield
- Simon & Simon: In Trouble Again (1995) – Bruce Marcom
- A Dangerous Place (1995) – Gavin
- Karate Tiger 8: Fists of Iron (1995) – Peter Gallagher
- The Colony (1995) – Doug Corwin
- Pacific Blue (1996–2000) (TV) – Jack Bannister
- The Sentinel (1996–1999) (TV) – Wade Rooker
- Promised Land (1996–1999) (TV) – Sheriff Oakley
- The Rock (1996) – Navy Seal Reigert
- The Bad Pack (1997) – Lamont Sperry
- Stargate SG-1 (1997–2007) (TV) – AF Colonel Frank Cromwell
- Rough Riders (1997) – Jack 'Black Jack' Pershing
- On the Line (1997) – Jay
- Pensacola: Wings of Gold (1997–2000) (TV) – Colonel Drayton
- Soldier of Fortune, Inc. (1997–1999) (TV) – David Drummer
- Armageddon (1998) – Colonel Davis
- Crusade (1999) (TV) – Captain Daniels
- 18 Wheels of Justice (2000–2001) (TV) – Terrance Sanders
- Crime and Punishment in Suburbia (2000) – Coach
- Across the Line (1999) – Ty Parker Johnson
- Crossfire Trail (2001) – 'Snake' Corville
- U.S. Seals II: The Ultimate Force (2001) – Major Nathan Donner
- Dawn of Our Nation (2001) – Paul Revere
- What Matters Most (2001) – Raymond Warner
- Second to Die (2002) – Captain Burris
- She Spies (2002–2004) (TV) – Phoenix
- Robbery Homicide Division (2002–2003) (TV) – Sergeant Wike
- Monte Walsh (2003) – Wallace 'Dally' Johnson
- Bells of Innocence (2003) – Joshua Ravel
- Disaster (2003) – Chief Hackett
- Crash Nitro Kart (2003) (VG)- Krunk
- Special Forces (2003) – Major Don Harding
- Criminal Minds (2005–) (TV) – Dr. Edward Calder
- The Cutter (2005) – Lieutenant Moore
- Walker, Texas Ranger: Trial by Fire (2005) – Derek Gibbs
- The Pros and Cons of Breathing (2006) – Dr. Benjamin
- House of the Rising Sun (2006) – George Trilleau
- Friday Night Lights (2006–2011) (TV) – John Aroldi
- Splitting Hairs (2007) – Charlie Pluders
- American Identity (2007) – General Farmington
- In Plain Sight (2008–2012) (TV) – Alan Cohen
- Leverage (2008–2012) (TV) – Rampone
- Scoundrels (2010) (TV) – John Stierson
- Universal Squadrons (2011) – Dr. White
- Last Ounce of Courage (2012) – Bob Revere
- Divorce Texas Style (2013) – Frank Douglas
- Front Porch (2014) – James
- American Crime (2015–2017) (TV) – Ben Callahan
- Road to the Well (2015) – Dale
- Hardin (2015) – John B. Armstrong
- The Hard Ride (2015) – Judge Bennett
- Oil Run (2016) – Agent Baker
- Amerigeddon (2016) – Col. Crane
- Hell on the Border (2019) – Senator Smith

== Personal appearances ==
- Jaret Goes to the Movies podcast (episode 40 - Road House)

== Personal life ==
Teague has been married to his wife, Lindy, since 1998. Having attended two military academies in his youth, Teague joined the Navy at age 17. During his time in service, Teague won the NATO heavyweight kickboxing championship. Teague has served on the boards of directors of the Quail and Upland Wildlife Federation and Kickstart Kids with his wife.
