= The Bob Newhart Show: The 19th Anniversary Special =

- Written by: Mark Egan; Mark Solomon; Michael Mahler
- Directed by: Dick Martin
- Starring: Bob Newhart; Suzanne Pleshette; Peter Bonerz; Bill Daily; Marcia Wallace; Jack Riley
- Music by: Pat Williams
- Opening theme: "Home to Emily" by Lorenzo Music and Henrietta Music
- Country of origin: United States
- Original language: English

Production
- Executive producers: George Zaloom; Les Mayfield
- Producer: Jean-Michel Michenaud
- Cinematography: Kevin McNight
- Editors: David Palmer; Doug Nichols
- Running time: 60 minutes
- Production companies: Zaloom-Mayfield Productions; MTM Enterprises

Original release
- Network: CBS
- Release: November 23, 1991

Related
- The Bob Newhart Show; Newhart

The Bob Newhart Show: The 19th Anniversary Special is a 1991 American television special to commemorate the 19th anniversary of the 1972–1978 sitcom The Bob Newhart Show. Directed by Dick Martin, it was taped in front of a live audience on October 30, 1991, at CBS Studio Center in Studio City, California, and broadcast on CBS on November 23, 1991.

== Summary ==
Bob Newhart hosts a 19th anniversary retrospective of The Bob Newhart Show in front of a live studio audience. After an opening monologue by Newhart, the special begins with a continuation from the series finale of Newhart when it was revealed that the entire series was a dream experienced by Newhart's Dr. Robert Hartley character (The Bob Newhart Show) in which he was an inn-keeper in a small Vermont town.

The show is set in Chicago in the same apartment and office that Bob Hartley had in the 1970s. Bob goes to work and is greeted by his receptionist Carol Kester Bondurant (Marcia Wallace), who reminds him that it is the 20th anniversary of the start of his practice at the office (although Bob corrects her and notes that it is only 19 years). His wife Emily (Suzanne Pleshette) comes to visit to congratulate him, but Bob is disturbed over the dream he had, believing that it indicates he might be losing his mind. Emily decides to psychoanalyze Bob's dream to see what it means. Dr. Jerry Robinson (Peter Bonerz) visits them and Emily tells him about the dream; Jerry believes that such a dream was inevitable due to Bob's line of work. Howard Borden (Bill Daily) enters as well and at one point recalls he once had a similar dream of having been an astronaut in Florida for five years as scenes from I Dream of Jeannie featuring Daily as Major Roger Healey are shown. Mr. Carlin (Jack Riley) enters as well for his appointment, advising Bob to snap out of his concerns over his dream.

Together, everyone comes to the conclusion that Bob is having a mid-life crisis. A series of clips from episodes of The Bob Newhart Show are interspersed throughout while everyone manages to convince Bob that he has a good life and that he should enjoy it, and this seems to work. However, the show concludes with Bob leaving his office and, while waiting at the elevator, he runs into the Newhart characters Larry and the two Darryls (William Sanderson, Tony Papenfuss and John Voldstad) which further confuses him and instead he decides to take the stairs.

== Cast ==
- Bob Newhart as Dr. Robert "Bob" Hartley
- Suzanne Pleshette as Emily Hartley
- Peter Bonerz as Dr. Jerry Robinson
- Bill Daily as Howard Borden
- Marcia Wallace as Carol Kester Bondurant
- Jack Riley as Elliot Carlin
- William Sanderson as Larry
- Tony Papenfuss as Darryl #1
- John Voldstad as Darryl #2

== Home media ==
On May 27, 2014, The Bob Newhart Show: The 19th Anniversary Special was released by Shout! Factory as part of the DVD boxed-set The Bob Newhart Show: The Complete Series.
