= List of Newhart episodes =

The following is an episode list for the American television sitcom Newhart, that ran on CBS for eight seasons and 184 episodes, from October 25, 1982, to May 21, 1990. The show starred Bob Newhart, Mary Frann, Tom Poston, Julia Duffy, Peter Scolari, Steven Kampmann, and Jennifer Holmes, as well as other recurring characters.

== Series overview ==
Season	Episodes	Originally released	
Season	Episodes	First released	Last released
1	22	October 25, 1982	April 10, 1983
2	22	October 17, 1983	April 16, 1984
3	22	October 15, 1984	May 28, 1985
4	24	September 30, 1985	May 12, 1986
5	24	September 29, 1986	April 13, 1987
6	24	September 14, 1987	May 9, 1988
7	22	October 24, 1988	May 22, 1989
8	24	September 18, 1989	May 21, 1990

== Episodes ==
=== Season 1 (1982–83) ===
- This is the only season to be shot on videotape.

No. overall	No. in season	Title	Directed by	Written by	Original release date	Prod. code	Rating/share (households)
1	1	"In the Beginning"	John Rich	Barry Kemp	October 25, 1982	1210	23.7/34
Writer Dick Loudon and his wife Joanna move to Vermont and purchase the Stratford Inn, and encounter eccentric townsfolk such as George Utley, a competent but somewhat dimwitted handyman, and Kirk Devane, a habitual liar who runs the Minuteman Cafe next door. In addition, the Loudons hire Leslie Vanderkellen, the daughter of a wealthy family, to serve as their maid. After opening for business, Dick must break the news to the Daughters of the War for Independence that the Inn served as a brothel during the Revolutionary War period.
2	2	"Mrs. Newton's Body Lies A-Mould'ring in the Grave"	Will Mackenzie	Katherine Green	November 1, 1982	2106	22.2/33
When the Loudons find out that there is a body buried down in the basement of the Inn, they try to get the body moved to the church graveyard. But they later find out the body used to be the body of a witch. First appearance of Larry, Darryl & Darryl.
3	3	"Hail to the Councilman"	Will Mackenzie	Sheldon Bull	November 8, 1982	2101	19.5/29
When Dick is asked to run for town council, he gets help from Joanna and Leslie with his campaign. First appearance of Jim and Chester.
4	4	"Shall We Gather at the River?"	Will Mackenzie	Paul Robinson Hunter	November 15, 1982	2107	24.2/36
Dick talks a reluctant Joanna into going to the annual River Day Festival, where she falls through the ice.
5	5	"This Probably Is Condemned"	Will Mackenzie	Barton Dean	November 22, 1982	2103	20.6/30
Dick and the gang pitch in to help Kirk get the Minuteman up to code after its shut down. Dick Christie appears as a maple syrup salesman, and Jim Boeke as the health inspector.
6	6	"No Tigers at the Circus"	Will Mackenzie	Earl Pomerantz	November 29, 1982	2109	20.7/29
Dick becomes bent out of shape when Stratford Inn is denied its bid to be classified as a historical landmark.
7	7	"The Perfect Match"	Dick Martin	Stuart Silverman	December 6, 1982	2105	19.1/27
Leslie's high school sweetheart (Howard McGillin) returns to ask her to marry him. This makes Kirk jealous.
8	8	"Some Are Born Writers...Others Have Writers Thrust Upon Them"	Will Mackenzie	Emily Marshall	December 13, 1982	2108	21.3/31
Dick praises an author's work in order to spare her feelings. The author's enthusiastic husband (Earl Boen) quits his job so that his wife can be a writer full time. It is up to Dick to find her an agent and teach her how to write. The writer is played by Judith Kahan, who is Steven Kampmann's real-life wife.
9	9	"No Room at the Inn"	Dick Martin	Barry Kemp, Sheldon Bull and Emily Marshall	December 20, 1982	2112	22.5/34
The Inn is overcrowded when 24 guests are snowed in for Christmas Eve. Kirk helps to keep the guests entertained while Dick attempts to find a place for a man named Joseph and his pregnant wife to stay for the night.
10	10	"The Senator's Wife Was Indiscreet"	Dick Martin	John Steven Owen	December 27, 1982	2102	18.5/28
A United States Senator's wife (Penny Fuller) checks into the Stratford Inn and holds a press conference saying that she will divorce her husband (Robert Hogan).
11	11	"Sprained Dreams"	Will Mackenzie	Rich Reinhart	January 3, 1983	2110	20.6/29
While Leslie is trying to teach Dick how to ski, he accidentally falls on her, jeopardizing her dream of becoming a professional skier and making her unable to go on a date with Kirk. Alley Mills as Leslie's professor; Stephen Furst as a classmate.
12	12	"The Way We Thought We Were"	Will Mackenzie	John Steven Owen	January 10, 1983	2111	21.3/31
George's old girlfriend (Rue McClanahan) visits the Inn and both of them are surprised to see they have both changed greatly.
13	13	"The Visitors"	Michael Zinberg	Earl Pomerantz	January 17, 1983	2113	17.3/25
Dick and Joanna are excited that their "fun" friends are visiting them, but they are not as happy when they treat them more like innkeepers instead of friends. Guest starring Dana Elcar and K Callan.
14	14	"What Is This Thing Called Lust?"	Will Mackenzie	Emily Marshall	January 31, 1983	2120	20.7/29
Leslie's attractive cousin Stephanie visits Vermont and develops feelings for Kirk. Meanwhile, Joanna is excited when George gets a free piano for the Inn's lobby. First appearance of Stephanie Vanderkellen (Julia Duffy).
15	15	"Breakfast Theater"	Will Mackenzie	Chip Keyes & Doug Keyes	February 7, 1983	2117	14.6/19
A washed-up comic, Manny Silver (Bobby Ramsen), visits the Inn, reminding Dick of the "debt" he owes him for starting his writing career. Manny gets Dick to let him perform at the Stratford.
16	16	"Ricky Nelson, Up Your Nose"	Will Mackenzie	Barton Dean	February 14, 1983	2115	17.5/25
Kirk goes to the hospital to get surgery to remove an object from his nose and Larry, Darryl, and Darryl are in charge of his cafe.
17	17	"A View from the Bench"	Will Mackenzie	Sheldon Bull	February 21, 1983	2121	19.9/28
Dick, Kirk, and George use their bench passes for a Boston Celtics game, but Dick loses his pass. Joanna and Leslie wait at the Inn for a famous guest. Special appearance by Daniel J. Travanti as himself. Ernie Sabella as a policeman.
18	18	"The Boy Who Cried Goat"	Will Mackenzie	Barbara Hall	March 13, 1983	2114	22.6/34
Kirk's cafe gets robbed, but the police don't believe his story of how it happened when he tells them.
19	19	"Heaven Knows Mr. Utley"	Will Mackenzie	Bill Taub & Jeff Lewis	March 20, 1983	2119	22.0/34
When George believes he saw a UFO, nobody believes him and he is mocked by the whole town. James Avery appears in this episode.
20	20	"You're Homebody Till Somebody Loves You"	Will Mackenzie	Emily Marshall	March 27, 1983	2124	13.6/19
Dick insults Joanna and calls her a homebody, making her want to get a job. Jerry Van Dyke appears as a travel agent who hires her.
21	21	"Grandma, What a Big Mouth You Have"	Will Mackenzie	Barton Dean	April 3, 1983	2125	17.9/28
Kirk's grandmother (Ruth Gordon) visits on the same day he has a date with Leslie.
22	22	"I Enjoy Being a Guy"	Will Mackenzie	Bob Perlow & Gene Braunstein	April 10, 1983	2123	21.4/32
Dick's friends Chester and Jim invite him to play golf with them. But his friends gamble and lose making him the winner. He tries to give the money back without breaking the "guy code." Kirk takes George shopping for clothes. Last appearance of Jennifer Holmes as Leslie Vanderkellen.

=== Season 2 (1983–84) ===
- Seasons 2–8 were shot on film.

No. overall	No. in season	Title	Directed by	Written by	Original release date	Prod. code	Rating/share (households)
23	1	"It Happened One Afternoon: Part 1"	Rod Daniel	Barry Kemp	October 17, 1983	3101	17.1/25
Dick goes to New York to interview a star named Erica Chase (Stella Stevens) for a possible biography. Joanna hires Stephanie to be the new maid. John Reilly appears as Erica's manager, and Lee Wilkof as Dick's agent, Elliot.
24	2	"It Happened One Afternoon: Part 2"	Rod Daniel	Barry Kemp	October 24, 1983	3102	20.1/29
Erica Chase falls in love with Dick while Stephanie's father flies to Vermont to try to get her to go back home with him. Richard Roat as Arthur Vanderkellen. (Later played by Jose Ferrer.)
25	3	"Animal Attractions"	Rod Daniel	Emily Marshall	October 31, 1983	3103	19.6/29
George finds a stray dog whom he names "Lucky" and Stephanie's (much older) husband, Carl (Murray Matheson), drops by the Inn to find out why she left him.
26	4	"The Stratford Wives"	Donna Wheeler	Barbara Hall	November 7, 1983	3106	19.2/28
Joanna creates a stir at a potluck dinner by breaking a long-standing tradition whereby men eat in the dining room, women in the kitchen.
27	5	"The Girl from Manhattan"	Linda Day	Story by : Michael Vetrie; Teleplay by : Nat Mauldin	November 14, 1983	3108	19.2/28
Joanna convinces Dick to do a play he had written years before. Joanna gets mad when she is cast as her mother instead of herself in the play.
28	6	"Don't Rain on My Parade"	Will Mackenzie	Barbara Hall	November 21, 1983	3115	18.6/27
Dick volunteers Joanna to serve turkeys to over 100 people. George is upset when rain ruins his Thanksgiving Day Parade. George D. Wallace and Peggy McCay play Joanna's parents. Iron Eyes Cody has a cameo.
29	7	"Lady & the Tramps"	Donna Wheeler	Emily Marshall	December 5, 1983	3112	18.2/26
Stephanie goes out for a walk and gets lost in a snowstorm. She finds Larry, Darryl, and Darryl's home. William Sadler as Clumsy Guest.
30	8	"The Man Who Came Forever"	Rod Daniel	Sheldon Bull	December 12, 1983	3105	18.2/27
Dick has a deadline for when he has to finish writing his book but can't get it done due to interruptions. Kirk decides he wants to build a miniature golf course, George is worried about retirement, and a guest at the Inn (Ernie Sabella) refuses to leave.
31	9	"The Looks of Love"	Dick Martin	Shelley Zellman	December 19, 1983	3104	17.3/25
Kirk joins a singles club hoping to find a girlfriend. Shanna Reed as the woman he fails to impress. Ernie Sabella as the guest carried over from the previous episode.
32	10	"Kirk Goes for the Juggler"	Will Mackenzie	Emily Marshall	January 2, 1984	3109	23.5/33
Kirk believes he has found the girl of his dreams, but he reconsiders when he hears she is a professional clown. Rebecca York's first appearance as Cindy Parker.
33	11	"A Jug of Wine, a Loaf of Bread and POW"	Dick Martin	Barry Kemp, Sheldon Bull and Emily Marshall	January 9, 1984	3120	14.7/21
Joanna and Stephanie attend a poetry reading at Dartmouth where the Professor (John Reilly) has a special interest in Joanna. Dick gets steamed when he hears he made a pass at his wife. Kirk and Cindy convince George to go in with them on basketball tickets.
34	12	"Cats"	Jim Drake	Barry Kemp, Sheldon Bull and Emily Marshall	January 16, 1984	3121	17.3/25
Stephanie's old boyfriend (David Huffman) and his wife visit the Inn. Kirk throws a dinner party for Cindy, Dick, Joanna, and himself.
35	13	"Curious George at the Firehouse"	Will Mackenzie	Barbara Hall	January 23, 1984	3111	19.7/28
George becomes a volunteer fireman but loses the keys to the fire truck right when the town's first fire in five years takes place.
36	14	"Book Beat"	Will Mackenzie	Story by : Will Porter & Rich Procter; Teleplay by : Miriam Trogdon	January 30, 1984	3114	19.4/27
After Dick guest stars on a TV show, they ask him to be the new host of the show. His first show gets off to a bad start, though, when his guest star does not show up, and the replacement (Guy Boyd) turns out to be delusional. (This marks Peter Scolari's debut as Michael Harris; he would go on to become a regular cast member beginning with Season 3.)
37	15	"Kirk Pops the Question"	Jim Drake	Miriam Trogdon	February 6, 1984	3119	14.9/21
Kirk asks Dick and George for advice about whether or not he should propose to Cindy. Dick makes a personal appearance at a local hardware store to sign copies of his book. Frank Bonner appears as a guest who has phobias about hotels and stairs. Richard Stahl as a waiter.
38	16	"Best Friends"	Will Mackenzie	Barry Kemp and Emily Marshall	February 13, 1984	3123	13.8/20
Kirk fears his cafe will be out of business when a fast-food company wants to build a restaurant in town. But when they announce they want to build on the site of the café he realizes he will be rich if he sells, and must make a difficult decision.
39	17	"Kirk Ties One On"	Will Mackenzie	Barry Kemp, Sheldon Bull and Emily Marshall	February 27, 1984	3122	13.9/19
Kirk can't wait till his wedding day with Cindy, but when the day finally comes, he faints during the ceremony. Bill Quinn as the minister.
40	18	"Go, Grandma, Go"	John Tracy	Barbara Hall	March 5, 1984	3126	17.7/27
Kirk's grandmother (Ruth Gordon) visits and loans her car to Kirk and Cindy for their honeymoon. But when Kirk gets arrested for possession of a stolen car, he realizes something is wrong. Squire Fridell appears as a policeman.
41	19	"Leave It to the Beavers"	Will Mackenzie	Emily Marshall, Barbara Hall and Miriam Trogdon	March 12, 1984	3127	14.4/22
George's club, the Beavers, reject Dick for a membership. A guest at the Inn (Richard Sanders) is accompanied by an imaginary wife. Kirk and Cindy have their first fight. Rebecca York's final appearance as Cindy Parker.
42	20	"Vermont Today"	John Tracy	Barry Kemp, Sheldon Bull and Emily Marshall	March 19, 1984	3129	22.4/34
Dick gets his own television program called Vermont Today. Stephanie meets the man of her dreams, Michael Harris. Anne Haney plays a cooking show host. Britt Leach makes a guest appearance, as does Lucy Lee Flippin as the basset hound lady.
43	21	"Send Her, Ella"	John Tracy	Barbara Hall & Miriam Trogdon	March 26, 1984	3128	21.0/32
Stephanie is disappointed when she has to watch the Inn rather than compete in the Maple Syrup beauty contest. So she makes a disguise and sneaks off to the competition, leaving the Inn in the hands of a seemingly-trustworthy guest (Billie Bird).
44	22	"New Faces of 1951"	John Tracy	Story by : Neal Marlens; Teleplay by : Ken Peragine & Howard Friedlander	April 16, 1984	3107	16.6/26
Dick and Joanna plan a birthday party for George when he reveals he has never had one. Dick calls and invites everyone George knows, but they are all busy. He instead calls what he thinks are George's Air National Guard buddies. Last appearance of Steven Kampmann as Kirk Devane.

=== Season 3 (1984–85) ===
No. overall	No. in season	Title	Directed by	Written by	Original release date	Prod. code	Rating/share (households)
45	1	"Tell a Lie, Get a Check"	John Tracy	Dan Wilcox	October 15, 1984	4105	21.0/31
Dick and Joanna return from their vacation to find Kirk and Cindy have moved to Europe and that Kirk has asked Dick to sell his cafe. Michael wants Dick to tape a tacky ad to promote his TV show. Ray Walston appears in this episode.
46	2	"Twenty Year Itch"	Dick Martin	Miriam Trogdon	October 22, 1984	4109	18.8/28
Dick tags along when Joanna decides to keep a date made twenty years earlier with an old boyfriend. A guest at the Inn (Doug Rowe) annoys everyone by incessantly practicing on his trumpet. Derek McGrath plays a waiter.
47	3	"A Hunting We Will Go"	Jim Drake	Barton Dean	October 29, 1984	4104	16.2/24
Dick, George, Chester, Jim, and Michael go duck hunting on the opening day of hunting season to film a television special. They're all stranded when Michael forgets to tie off the boat. With death seemingly imminent, they all discuss their regrets in life, including Dick's admission that he always wanted to play Professor Harold Hill in The Music Man.
48	4	"Miss Stephanie"	Dick Martin	Douglas Wyman	November 5, 1984	4111	18.4/28
Larry is overly encouraged by a compliment from Stephanie and announces that he intends to marry her.
49	5	"But Seriously, Beavers"	Ellen Falcon	Arnie Kogen & Gary Jacobs	November 12, 1984	4112	19.1/28
Dick's jokes at a Beaver Lodge roast for George are a hit with everyone except the guest of honor, spurring George to consider leaving the Inn. Stephanie sells cosmetic kits.
50	6	"Tickets, Please"	John Tracy	Barton Dean	November 19, 1984	4114	14.0/20
Dick throws a fit and is sentenced for outstanding parking tickets on the day of a big Celtics game. Stephanie, who's never been punished for anything in her life, can't bring herself to tell Dick that she's the one who got the tickets. Jeff Corey portrays the judge.
51	7	"Poor Reception"	Dick Martin	E.J. Purdum	November 26, 1984	4110	18.0/26
After Michael is roped into hiring Stephanie as WPIV's receptionist, he can't bring himself to fire her. Meanwhile, Joanna hires Harley Estin as a temporary maid.
52	8	"The Fan"	John Tracy	Shelley Zellman	December 3, 1984	4108	20.5/30
A fan of Dick's (Deena Freeman) annoys him, starts a Dick Loudon Fan Club, and moves into the Inn. Gloria Henry has a cameo as a guest of the Inn.
53	9	"Happy Trials to You"	Jim Drake	Douglas Wyman	December 10, 1984	4102	23.3/35
Dick has to go to court when a farmer (Raye Birk) claims he plagiarized his work. Note: The final episode of The Bob Newhart Show was called "Happy Trails to You", so this title might be a riff on that episode title.
54	10	"Georgie's Girl"	Jim Drake	Miriam Trogdon	December 31, 1984	4103	15.6/29
George panics when his new girlfriend (Susan Ruttan) starts to talk about marriage. Stephanie tries to pass the driver's test.
55	11	"Pillow Fight"	Peter Baldwin	Shelley Zellman	January 7, 1985	4117	20.8/30
Dick and Joanna squabble over "creative differences" when they collaborate on a book on pillows. Larry, Darryl, and Darryl stay at the Inn until their house is done being fumigated. Lee Wilkof as Dick's agent, Elliot
56	12	"Local Hero"	John Pasquin	Ellen Guylas	January 14, 1985	4116	19.3/28
George becomes a local hero after he saves two boys from drowning.
57	13	"Dick Gets Larry's Goat"	Burt Brinckerhoff	Barton Dean	February 4, 1985	4119	15.1/21
When the Loudons call animal control on Larry's goat, they get in a battle with Larry and the Darryls.
58	14	"Once I Had a Secret Love"	John Pasquin	Ellen Guylas	February 11, 1985	4106	19.9/29
Dick and Joanna spar after Dick is 'riddled' with doubts when Joanna is set to appear on his Valentine's Day Show. Jack Bannon as "The Love Doctor"
59	15	"Lady in Wading"	John Tracy	David Mirkin	February 18, 1985	4115	17.9/26
Stephanie meets a television executive (Charles Frank) whom she falls for, but she must choose between him or Michael.
60	16	"Look Homeward, Stephanie"	Ellen Falcon	Miriam Trogdon	February 25, 1985	4121	18.7/27
Stephanie returns home and visits briefly but soon decides to stay after she is overwhelmed with presents. José Ferrer and Priscilla Morrill's debuts as Arthur and Marian Vanderkellen.
61	17	"My Fair Larry"	Burt Brinckerhoff	Michael Kagan	March 4, 1985	4113	20.7/30
Joanna undertakes a massive project when she agrees to try to spruce up Larry, Darryl, and Darryl—along with their Minuteman cafe. Walter Olkewicz plays a guest at the Inn who suffers from insomnia.
62	18	"You're Nobody Till Somebody Hires You"	Richard Sakai	David Mirkin	March 11, 1985	4122	19.7/30
After demanding extravagant perks, Michael is fired from WPIV. Bev replaces him with Dick. An unemployed Michael falls to pieces, and Dick is exasperated with his new job duties. Richard Stahl as a member of the TV crew.
63	19	"Out with the New, Inn with the Good"	Dick Martin	Tracy Gamble & Richard Vaczy	March 18, 1985	4118	21.3/32
George is upset when Dick and Harley Estin decide to remodel the garage. Joanna hosts a rummage sale.
64	20	"R.I.P. Off"	Peter Baldwin	Russ Woody	April 8, 1985	4120	19.2/30
Harley (Jeff Doucette ) goes to jail after he is tricked into selling swamp grave plots. Michael, Dick and Joanna set up an "Abscam" to catch the real criminal, Harley's boss (George Wyner). G. W. Bailey has a cameo as a member of the Beaver Lodge.
65	21	"The Prodigal Darryl"	Dick Martin	Douglas Wyman	May 6, 1985	4123	18.1/27
Larry's brother Darryl runs off after he and his brothers win a contest for writing the best commercial jingle, netting them $30,000. Dick, Larry and his other brother Darryl search for the missing brother. Meanwhile, Joanna decorates the Inn in Christmas decor for a Christmas card photo.
66	22	"What Makes Dick Run"	Dick Martin	Arnie Kogen & Gary Jacobs	May 27, 1985	4124	12.5/19
Dick and his crew have VITA fever when the local broadcasting awards, the VITAs, are scheduled to be announced. Dick, inspired by a puppet show put on by Larry and the boys for an ailing Stephanie, decides to jazz up his act to win a VITA nomination. Richard Stahl as part of the TV crew. Estelle Getty as a guest on Vermont Today.

=== Season 4 (1985–86) ===
No. overall	No. in season	Title	Directed by	Written by	Original release date	Prod. code	Rating/share (households)
67	1	"Pirate Pete"	Peter Baldwin	Gary Belkin	September 30, 1985	5112	21.2/30
Dick fills in for kiddie TV program host Pirate Pete (David Wayne), but is appalled by Pete's commercialism and inadvertently gets the show canceled. George plays a practical joke on Stephanie, adjusting her scale up two pounds.
68	2	"The Way We Ought to Be"	Ellen Falcon	Miriam Trogdon	October 7, 1985	5104	18.5/27
Michael and Stephanie break up when Michael decides he's tired of her demanding ways. Dick has troubles with the WPIV staff when they're slow to direct his show.
69	3	"Summa Cum Larry"	Peter Baldwin	Arnie Kogen & Gary Jacobs	October 21, 1985	5102	20.2/29
Dick covers for Larry when he goes to night school and doesn't want the Darryls to know he's improving himself. Joanna obsesses when a travel guide appears to have lowered the Inn's rating. Sandy Helberg as Larry's teacher. Richard Seff as the travel guide's author.
70	4	"Oh, That Morocco"	Peter Baldwin	Barton Dean	October 28, 1985	5113	19.4/29
Dick suggests to Joanna that she find a local organization to join in order to make new friends. After a disastrous first meeting with the Elm Street Society, Joanna becomes best friends with Stephanie, who insists they go on a vacation to Morocco. George builds a bookcase for the lobby by following the directions in one of Dick's books.
71	5	"Candidate Larry"	Dick Martin	Douglas Wyman	November 4, 1985	5101	17.6/25
Larry runs for mayor. Michael takes care of a friend's dog. Earl Boen as the mayor. The show is dedicated to Nelson Riddle, composer of incidental music for most of the shows, and who had died on October 6, 1985.
72	6	"Locks, Stocks, and Noodlehead"	Peter Baldwin	Barton Dean	November 11, 1985	5105	20.0/27
Stephanie's father visits the Inn with news that he has left his wife. The town celebrates Colonial Days, but Dick refuses to wear a colonial costume.
73	7	"The Geezers in the Band"	Dick Martin	David Mirkin	November 25, 1985	5103	21.7/31
When Dick's old high school jazz band reunites, Dick learns that expectations often exceed reality. Sorrell Booke as a band member.
74	8	"The Shape of Things"	Peter Baldwin	John Steven Owen	December 2, 1985	5110	19.5/27
Stephanie and Joanna organize an aerobics club. Problems arise when Stephanie makes herself the manager and Joanna the custodian.
75	9	"Write to Privacy"	Dick Martin	Susan Beavers	December 16, 1985	5108	17.3/26
Joanna and Stephanie are furious at Michael when they peek at his diary and find out what he really thinks of them.
76	10	"Still the Beavers"	Peter Baldwin	Katherine Green	December 23, 1985	5111	18.1/28
Dick convinces George to quit the Beaver Lodge when the Beavers cheat George out of a prize rightfully his. George starts a rival Lodge to get back at them.
77	11	"Much Ado About Mitch"	Dick Martin	Janet Leahy	January 6, 1986	5107	20.0/29
George joins a Big Brother program and is dismayed when his young protege Mitch (Scott Curtis) is awestruck by Dick's fast-paced lifestyle. Michael and Stephanie use a Ouija board.
78	12	"Look Ma, No Talent"	Ellen Falcon	Story by : Dan Wilcox & Jesse Levine; Teleplay by : Dan Wilcox	January 13, 1986	5106	21.6/31
Michael tries to find a talent to impress his mother (Ruth Manning).
79	13	"Larry's Dead, Long Live Larry"	John Pasquin	Lissa Levin	January 20, 1986	5109	21.0/31
Larry dedicates his life to Dick when he believes he brought him back from the dead.
80	14	"Stephanie Nightingale"	Ellen Falcon	Shelley Zellman	January 27, 1986	5117	18.5/27
Stephanie must take care of the Inn's staff and guests when the measles come to Vermont. Peter Hobbs plays a doctor.
81	15	"The Stratford Horror Picture Show"	John Pasquin	David Mirkin	February 3, 1986	5115	21.7/31
The Loudons are spooked when the ghost of Sarah Newton seems to be haunting the Inn. Bruce French and Marilyn Schreffler as the previous owners of the Inn.
82	16	"I Do, Okay"	Ellen Falcon	Douglas Wyman	February 10, 1986	5114	20.8/29
Joanna and a decidedly unenthusiastic Dick decide to renew their wedding vows to celebrate their wedding anniversary.
83	17	"The Snowmen Cometh"	John Pasquin	Arnie Kogen & Gary Jacobs	February 17, 1986	5116	18.5/27
The town panics when the annual Snow Carnival will probably be canceled due to lack of snow.
84	18	"Will the Real Dick Loudon Please Shut Up?"	Dick Martin	Phoef Sutton	February 24, 1986	5118	20.3/29
Dick is thrilled when a production company expresses interest in making How to be a Plumber into a video. His elation quickly dissipates when the producers decide to recast 'Dick Loudon' because of Dick's shifty eyes and stammer. Alan Autry plays "Dick Loudon" in the video. Carolyn Mignini as a guest who takes a liking to Larry, Darryl and Darryl.
85	19	"He Ain't Human, He's My Cousin"	John Pasquin	Barton Dean	March 3, 1986	5119	19.6/29
George meets his only living relative, his annoying cousin Eugene (Derek McGrath).
86	20	"Dwight Schmidlapp Is Not a Quitter"	Dick Martin	Janet Leahy	March 10, 1986	5120	17.7/26
On a lark, Dick submits his newest book to his publisher under the pseudonym he used when he first started writing, Dwight Schmidlapp, only to find it rejected. Dick sinks into a funk when he realizes he's 'coasting' in his writing career. Keith Charles as a publisher.
87	21	"Torn Between Three Brothers"	Dolores Ferraro	David Mirkin	March 17, 1986	5122	19.5/30
A jilted fiancée at the Inn (Teresa Ganzel) gets a job at the Minuteman café. She unwittingly encourages the affections of both Darryls but rejects them for the more vocal Larry. George organizes a citywide campaign when Michael pulls Barnaby Jones off the air in favor of The Secret Lives of Platinum Gold Dancers.
88	22	"Baby, I'm Your Handyman"	Peter Baldwin	Phoef Sutton	April 7, 1986	5123	19.5/30
Dick and Joanna worry that George is being taken advantage of after he becomes romantically involved with Loretta Dupris (Marlyn Mason), an actress with a reputation for using men. WPIV director J.J. Wall (Fred Applegate) becomes Dick's neighbor after he buys a historic house near the Stratford Inn that he plans to raze.
89	23	"Replaceable You"	J.D. Lobue	Miriam Trogdon	April 14, 1986	5124	20.1/30
Secretary Alma (Helen Page Camp) amazes Dick when she fills in as producer, who secures a rare interesting guest (Gerald Hiken). George asks Joanna for help with redecorating his room.
90	24	"Pre-Nups"	Peter Baldwin	Arnie Kogen & Gary Jacobs	May 12, 1986	5121	14.7/22
The Loudons, George, Steph, and Michael are invited to Vanderkellen mansion for Arthur's birthday. Arthur insists Michael sign a pre-nuptial agreement, which he refuses to do. Stephanie fears Michael's only dating her for her money. Dick worries when he breaks a music box given to Arthur by Winston Churchill.

=== Season 5 (1986–87) ===
No. overall	No. in season	Title	Directed by	Written by	Original release date	Prod. code	Rating/share (households)
91	1	"Co-Hostess Twinkie"	Dolores Ferraro	David Mirkin	September 29, 1986	6108	21.9/32
Dick is stuck with a perky, brainless co-hostess (Julie Brown) for his new program, On the Town. Meanwhile, Larry and the Darryls name their new pig 'Miss Stephanie' much to the real Stephanie's dismay.
92	2	"Camp Stephanie"	Tom Trbovich	Robin Pennington & Don Hart	October 6, 1986	6101	18.8/28
Stephanie has her hands full when she temporarily leads a group of 'Ranger Girls'. While Steph tries to teach them about coming-out parties and makeup, the girls want to learn survival techniques. Meanwhile, Dick and Joanna endure George's wood carving, Mount Stratford. Bob Newhart's daughter Courtney plays one of the Ranger Girls.
93	3	"Dick the Kid"	Barton Dean	Arnie Kogen	October 13, 1986	6109	21.5/31
Dick heads west to pursue his dream of being a cowboy. Stephanie secretly hires Larry, Darryl & Darryl to perform her housekeeping duties at the Inn. Kurtwood Smith and Blake Clark appear as cowboys.
94	4	"High Fidelity"	Michael Lessac	Tom Seeley & Norm Gunzenhauser	October 20, 1986	6105	20.4/30
Dick endures the townspeople's pity when Joanna and new friend Hal (Robert S. Woods) are suspected by everyone of having an affair. Stephanie is depressed after her hair dresser moves away.
95	5	"Desperately Desiring Susan: Part 1"	David Steinberg	Miriam Trogdon	October 27, 1986	6103	20.0/28
Michael meets an office secretary named Susan (Jean Bruce Scott) and falls in love with her.
96	6	"Desperately Desiring Susan: Part 2"	David Steinberg	Miriam Trogdon	November 3, 1986	6104	20.2/39
Michael has trouble deciding between Susan or Stephanie.
97	7	"My Two and Only"	Michael Lessac	Douglas Wyman	November 17, 1986	6107	17.0/24
A new friend (Sam Whipple) threatens Larry's position as family leader. Stephanie and Michael throw a party for themselves.
98	8	"Thanksgiving for the Memories"	J.D. Lobue	David Mirkin	November 24, 1986	6114	20.1/29
The Loudon family and friends travel to Vanderkellen mansion for Thanksgiving but are forced to leave early because Stephanie's parents threw away her favorite toy. Everyone ends up having Thanksgiving dinner at the Minuteman Café instead.
99	9	"Utley, Can You Spend a Dime?"	Tom Trbovich	David Tyron King	December 1, 1986	6102	21.2/31
Dick convinces George to spend some of his $50,000 fortune. Meanwhile the town believes Dick to be destitute after a check bounces due to a bank error.
100	10	"Sweet and Sour Charity"	Lee Shallat	David Tyron King	December 8, 1986	6112	19.0/28
Dick and Joanna have an opportunity to shed their 'town newcomer' status when Dick's asked to run a fundraiser for the local library. Dick, the former advertising executive, finds it a hard pill to swallow when his idea is rejected and Joanna's is unanimously applauded.
101	11	"Everybody Ought to Have a Maid"	Peter Baldwin	Michael Loman	December 15, 1986	6113	20.5/30
Stephanie fears she might lose her job when she breaks her toe and she is temporarily replaced. Millicent Martin as her highly-efficient replacement.
102	12	"Saturday in New York with George"	Peter Baldwin	Stuart Kreisman & Chris Cluess	December 22, 1986	6110	17.5/26
Dick and George attend a literary party in New York. Dick worries that George won't fit in with the high class partygoers and is stunned and jealous when George is the life of the party. Clive Revill, Robert Harper and Bill Quinn appear as party guests.
103	13	"Love Letters in the Mud"	J.D. Lobue	Shelley Zellman	January 5, 1987	6111	19.5/28
Michael helps Larry pursue the girl of his dreams (Valerie Mahaffey) and Joanna holds Dick responsible for his actions in her dream.
104	14	"First of the Belles"	Peter Baldwin	Douglas Wyman	January 12, 1987	6115	21.5/31
Dick's old college sweetheart (Shelley Fabares) visits the Inn, prompting concerns that she intends to reunite with Dick. Edan Gross has a funny cameo.
105	15	"It's My Party and I'll Die If I Want To"	Michael Lessac	Kerry Ehrin	January 19, 1987	6116	22.9/31
Cousin Ned Vanderkellen (Lyle Talbot) celebrates his 100th birthday but dies during the celebration.
106	16	"Chimes They Are a Changin'"	J.D. Lobue	Tom Seeley & Norm Gunzenhauser	January 26, 1987	6117	19.5/27
George tries to fix the town's bell tower after a big snowstorm and Michael rents The Wizard of Oz to overcome his fear of wind. Michael McManus plays a contractor competing with George for the job.
107	17	"Unfriendly Persuasion"	David Steinberg	Miriam Trogdon	February 2, 1987	6118	20.0/30
Dick attempts to help Joanna overcome her fear of eye doctors. After she disappoints him one time too many, George tells Stephanie that they can no longer be friends.
108	18	"Jail, Jail, the Gang's All Here"	J.D. Lobue	Arnie Kogen	February 9, 1987	6119	18.0/25
Larry, Darryl, and Darryl ask Dick to represent them after they're arrested for allegedly rustling a neighbor's cow. Stephanie and Michael suffer a crisis when a cuter couple appears in town. Ritch Brinkley as the brothers' neighbor.
109	19	"Dr. Jekyll and Mr. Loudon"	Michael Lessac	Merrill Markoe	February 16, 1987	6106	18.0/25
Dick gains an unwanted reputation as an acerbic wit after verbally assaulting an inept guest. Stephanie decides to get personalized license plates. Guest appearances by Simon Jones and Edwin Newman.
110	20	"Fun with Dick and Joanna"	Peter Baldwin	Linda Campanelli & M.M. Shelly Moore	February 23, 1987	6120	19.3/28
Dick and Joanna find that spontaneity isn't all its cracked up to be after Dick's spontaneous plans land them in a fleabag motel for the worst night of their lives. A young Gregory Jbara plays an unwelcome guest.
111	21	"Night Moves"	David Mirkin	David Mirkin	March 9, 1987	6122	15.7/22
When Joanna throws him out, Dick must find another place to sleep.
112	22	"Harris Ankles PIV for Web Post"	Douglas Wyman	Douglas Wyman	March 16, 1987	6121	21.9/32
Michael interviews for a network job. George discovers an unusual rock formation. Dick interviews a senator (Michael Fairman). Michael and Dick reminisce about 1970s TV shows and debate whether the star of The Bob Newhart Show had a "stutter" or a "stammer".
113	23	"Good Bye and Good Riddance, Mr. Chips"	David Steinberg	Arnie Kogen	April 6, 1987	6123	17.8/26
Dick enrolls in a typing class, only to find that the teacher, Mr. Brooney (William Windom), is the same tyrant he had for a sixth-grade teacher.
114	24	"Much to Do Without Muffin"	Peter Baldwin	Tom Seeley, Norm Gunzenhauser and David Tyron King	April 13, 1987	6124	16.7/26
Michael is lost when Stephanie goes away for the weekend. He goes to a Beaver Lodge dinner with George and is the life of the party. Russell Johnson has a cameo as a lodge member who joins the group in watching a Gilligan's Island marathon.

=== Season 6 (1987–88) ===
No. overall	No. in season	Title	Directed by	Written by	Original release date	Prod. code	Rating/share (households)
115	1	"Here's to You Mrs. Loudon"	Michael Lessac	Miriam Trogdon	September 14, 1987	7102	16.3/25
Joanna has difficulty discouraging a teenager (Robert MacNaughton) who has a crush on her. George tries to find a nickname for himself.
116	2	"Prima Darryl"	Dick Martin	Arnie Kogen	September 21, 1987	7104	19.1/30
Larry is no longer the leader when he learns that one of the Darryls is the oldest of the three. George annoys everyone at the Inn with his new sing-along boombox, the Portable Lounge Lizard.
117	3	"Inn This Corner"	Peter Baldwin	M.M. Shelly Moore & Linda Campanelli	September 28, 1987	7101	15.2/23
Dick and Joanna enjoy a fun couple (Allen Williams and Julie Cobb) who stay at the Inn until they say that they are opening another Inn down the street from the Stratford.
118	4	"Me and My Gayle"	Barton Dean	Tom Seeley & Norm Gunzenhauser	October 5, 1987	7103	19.5/30
George's forty-year high school reunion presents him with the opportunity to finally let his secret crush (Betsy Palmer) know his feelings for her. Stephanie and Michael are distressed when the new Winter fashion looks are unveiled.
119	5	"Reading, Writing, and Rating Points"	David Steinberg	David Tyron King	October 12, 1987	7105	19.2/29
Michael steals an idea for a new program from a student (John Zarchen) in the television production class he teaches. George's prediction of when the leaves will change to their Fall colors brings a guest (John Putch) to the Inn.
120	6	"Vintage Stephanie"	Douglas Wyman	Douglas Wyman	October 19, 1987	7106	16.9/25
Stephanie panics when she discovers she's no longer "blossoming". It takes Larry, Darryl, and Darryl's sage advice to break her depression. George buys blue jeans.
121	7	"Take Me to Your Loudon"	Zane Buzby	David Tyron King	October 26, 1987	7111	18.3/28
Michael seeks to create an Orson Welles-style panic when he programs The War of the Worlds on Halloween night. Dick desperately tries to control the panicked guests at the Inn's costume party.
122	8	"Till Depth Do Us Part: Part 1"	Michael Lessac	Miriam Trogdon	November 9, 1987	7112	16.4/24
Michael and Stephanie seek the help of a therapist after they realize their relationship might be growing cold. First appearance of Dr. Mary Kaiser (Melanie Chartoff).
123	9	"Till Depth Do Us Part: Part 2"	Michael Lessac	Arnie Kogen	November 16, 1987	7113	15.5/23
Michael and Stephanie plan their wedding. Jose Ferrer's final appearance as Arthur Vanderkellen.
124	10	"Telethon Man"	David Mirkin	David Mirkin	November 23, 1987	7107	18.1/27
Dick hosts a 48-hour telethon to raise money for WPIV.
125	11	"Laugh at My Wife, Please"	Michael Lessac	Dan O'Shannon	December 7, 1987	7108	15.8/24
Joanna delivers Dick's unfunny speech when she's picked to give historical presentations to tour groups. George babysits the Darryls while Larry vacations.
126	12	"Support Your Local Shifflet"	Peter Baldwin	Burt Prelutsky	December 14, 1987	7109	16.6/24
Dick encourages Officer Shifflet to go on strike when the town does not give him a raise.
127	13	"My Three Dads"	Jim Buck	Douglas Wyman	January 4, 1988	7115	17.2/24
Larry, Darryl and Darryl decide to adopt a child without knowing their child (Kevin Wixted) will be 18 years old. Nancy Lenehan as adoption agent. (Beginning with this episode, the list of guest stars in the closing credits also identifies the character each actor portrayed.)
128	14	"A Friendship That Will Last a Lunchtime"	Peter Baldwin	David Mirkin	January 11, 1988	7116	17.7/26
Dick's former co-host, Buffy Denver (Julie Brown), visits the Inn and becomes friends with Stephanie after discovering they have much in common.
129	15	"Presence of Malice"	David Steinberg	Marjorie Gross	January 18, 1988	7114	17.8/26
Dick has a showdown with a TV critic (Roderick Cook) after he says several negative things about Vermont Today. Larry, Darryl & Darryl make a pancake that looks like a celebrity.
130	16	"Would You Buy a Used Car from This Handyman?"	Dick Martin	David Tyron King	February 1, 1988	7117	15.6/23
George wishes to pursue his dream of becoming a used-car salesman. Stephanie and Michael build a Snow-Steph. Kurt Fuller plays a sleazy car salesman.
131	17	"The Buck Stops Here"	Lee Shallat	Tom Seeley & Norm Gunzenhauser	February 8, 1988	7118	13.9/19
Dick is skeptical of the town's belief in its good luck charm, the Great White Buck. He soon encounters the creature himself, not in a good way. A guest at the Inn (Bill Maher) pesters Stephanie for a date.
132	18	"Attention WPIV Shoppers"	David Steinberg	Merrill Markoe	February 15, 1988	7110	16.8/24
Dick is coaxed into hosting a home shopping show with Stephanie. Joanna tries to make the pudding that George's mother made for him when he was a boy.
133	19	"The Big Uneasy"	Dick Martin	Arnie Kogen	February 22, 1988	7119	15.8/22
Michael is tempted by a television executive (Carol Huston) during a conference in New Orleans. After fire destroys the kitchen of the Minuteman Cafe, Joanna reluctantly agrees to let Larry, Darryl & Darryl temporarily use the Stratford's kitchen and dining room to serve their lunch and dinner customers. Mindy Rickles and Scott Lawrence have early-career cameos.
134	20	"Draw Partner"	Dick Martin	Marjorie Gross	March 7, 1988	7120	16.3/25
Dick gets a chance to work with his favorite illustrator (Eileen Brennan), but she turns out to be difficult. Joanna and George wait for the Inn's 5,000th guest to arrive.
135	21	"A Midseason's Night Dream"	David Mirkin	David Mirkin	March 14, 1988	7121	17.5/27
This episode goes inside several characters' dreams: Dick dreams all his troubles have disappeared; George dreams he can fly; Stephanie dreams of being tormented by a wicked Joanna; Michael runs three major networks; and Larry guest hosts The Tonight Show. Special appearances by Ed McMahon (voice only), Tommy Newsom, Joan Embry, Fred Travalena and Emma Samms as themselves.
136	22	"Newsstruck"	Douglas Wyman	Douglas Wyman	March 21, 1988	7122	15.8/24
Michael starts producing the news, and to his surprise, he enjoys it, but Stephanie feels neglected. George tries to give up on the Red Sox. Julia Duffy's real-life husband Jerry Lacy appears as the news anchor. Dakin Matthews plays the news editor.
137	23	"The Gleeless Club"	David Steinberg	Miriam Trogdon	May 2, 1988	7124	13.4/21
Dick is accepted into the town glee club while Joanna is not. Anne Nelson as the choir director.
138	24	"Courtin' Disaster"	Lee Shallat	Tom Seeley & Norm Gunzenhauser	May 9, 1988	7123	13.3/20
Joanna sets George up on a blind date. Everything goes perfectly for George and his date (Elinor Donahue) until her ex-boyfriend (Ron Karabatsos) shows up. A guest at the Inn (Jason Alexander) is a very generous tipper.

=== Season 7 (1988–89) ===
No. overall	No. in season	Title	Directed by	Written by	Original release date	Prod. code	U.S. viewers (millions)	Rating/share (households)
139	1	"Town Without Pity"	David Steinberg	Dan O'Shannon & Tom Anderson	October 24, 1988	8102	18.0	13.0/20
A prisoner (Ken Jenkins) breaks out of prison using one of Dick's "How-to" books. Rebecca Schull has a cameo.
140	2	"Apples, Apples, Apples"	Peter Baldwin	Bob Bendetson & Howard Bendetson	October 31, 1988	8104	16.2	12.2/20
Michael revs up the stale Ye Olde Apple Days festival, leaving George and his traditional activities in the cold... until George organizes a rival festival. Larry and his brothers stage a walk-a-thon when swampland is endangered. Chester debates with Jim whether Stubby Kaye was in The Music Man. (William Lanteau (Chester) had played opposite Kaye in Li'l Abner.)
141	3	"This Blood's for You"	Dick Martin	Mark Egan & Mark Solomon	November 14, 1988	8105	17.1	13.0/20
Stephanie is initially horrified to discover that a blood transfusion during an emergency appendectomy came from Larry's other brother Darryl.
142	4	"I Married Dick"	Lee Shallat	Shelley Zellman	November 21, 1988	8103	15.9	11.6/18
Stephanie is worried after she learns that Michael had large ears as a child. Dick and Joanna attend a counseling session for couples with therapist Mary Kaiser (Melanie Chartoff). Jack Riley (Elliot Carlin on The Bob Newhart Show) makes an appearance as one of Dr. Kaiser's patients. In a coincidental foreshadowing of the series finale, Dick tells Riley's character that he looks familiar. The group therapy session features a low-income couple named the Hollidays.
143	5	"Goonstruck"	Michael Lessac	Billy Van Zandt & Jane Milmore	December 12, 1988	8101	16.7	12.3/19
Stephanie becomes attracted to a stonemason (Jeff Yagher) working at the Inn. Joanna wants to update the Inn's brochure, and goes on a photo-taking binge.
144	6	"I Came, I Saw, I Sat"	Dick Martin	Shelley Zellman	December 19, 1988	8108	17.9	13.2/21
Dick's father (Bob Elliott) visits the Inn.
145	7	"Twelve Annoyed Men...and Women"	Peter Baldwin	Bob Bendetson	January 9, 1989	8110	16.9	12.8/19
Dick's patience is tried when he's elected foreman of a jury of the townspeople, who as always use their peculiar intellect to irk Dick. First appearance of town librarian Prudence Goddard (Kathy Kinney). Tim Choate plays a lonely juror who votes opposite of everyone else, to keep the group going.
146	8	"Home for the Hollidays"	Stephen C. Grossman	Ellen Guylas	January 16, 1989	8106	17.7	13.0/20
Joanna lands a job selling real estate. Her first sale hits a snag when her low-class clients, the Hollidays, stay at the Inn while looking for a home. Dick leaves the Inn to George in his will, to Stephanie's consternation.
147	9	"Shoe Business Is My Life"	David Steinberg	Dan O'Shannon & Tom Anderson	January 23, 1989	8107	17.3	12.6/19
Michael searches for a job when he is fired by WPIV's new station manager (Robert Rockwell). Larry, Darryl & Darryl gather donations for a time capsule.
148	10	"George and the Old Maid"	Dick Martin	Dan O'Shannon & Tom Anderson	February 6, 1989	8111	16.1	11.7/17
The Inn's old maid, Madelyn Stone (Inga Swenson), returns after a 25-year absence to answer George's marriage proposal.
149	11	"Hi, Society"	Michael Lessac	David Silverman & Stephen Sustarsic	February 13, 1989	8112	19.1	13.9/21
Dick fills in for Michael and takes Stephanie to a high society charity ball. Dick is the life of the party after Stephanie tells everyone that Dick owns a large hotel chain. First appearance of Scooter Drake (Alex Hyde-White). Frances Fisher plays a frenemy of Stephanie's. Merv Griffin has a cameo as himself. Various offscreen celebrities' names are dropped, including Donald Trump. Stephanie and George try to catch a glimpse of a reclusive guest (Leslie Jordan).
150	12	"Cupcake on My Back"	Michael Lessac	Story by : Billy Van Zandt & Jane Milmore and Mark Egan & Mark Solomon; Teleplay by : Mark Egan & Mark Solomon	February 20, 1989	8109	18.7	13.1/19
Michael is in debt when he spends his money on Annual Cupcake Day. A poker game comes between Jim and Chester's friendship. Michael and Stephanie's therapist (Melanie Chartoff) is a customer at the shoe store, just before Michael is fired and breaks up with Stephanie.
151	13	"Another Saturday Night"	Arlene Sanford	Bob Bendetson & Howard Bendetson	February 27, 1989	8113	17.0	12.8/20
Michael and Joanna endure an initially torturous evening at Larry, Darryl and Darryl's house. Dick gives a commencement speech at an exclusive children's school. Raye Birk plays the school's dean.
152	14	"The Nice Man Cometh"	Dick Martin	Billy Van Zandt & Jane Milmore	March 13, 1989	8114	17.7	13.0/20
Dick is forced to be the sidekick for a new late-night talk show, Vermont Tonight, hosted by a washed-up comedian named "Don Prince" (Newhart's long-time friend Don Rickles). Ed McMahon plays a guest on the show. Robert Rockwell as the TV station owner.
153	15	"One and a Half Million Dollar Man"	Peter Baldwin	Bob Bendetson & Howard Bendetson	March 20, 1989	8115	18.2	13.6/21
Wealthy society blue blood Scooter Drake (Alex Hyde-White) comes to Vermont in hopes of buying an inn. Larry and the Darryls seem to know Scooter. Michael begins a new career as a mime.
154	16	"The Little Match Girl"	David Steinberg	Dan O'Shannon & Tom Anderson	March 27, 1989	8116	15.8	12.4/21
While visiting Michael in a sanitarium he has checked himself into, Dick runs into illustrator Corinne Denby (Eileen Brennan) and invites her to collaborate with him on his next book... despite her habit of burning things. Robert Picardo plays an inmate with homicidal leanings.
155	17	"Buy, Buy Blues"	David Steinberg	Story by : Jerry Lacy; Teleplay by : Heather Stewart	April 10, 1989	8117	19.5	15.1/24
Trying to forget Michael, Stephanie throws her clothes away and goes on a shopping spree. Michael is released from the sanitarium after his evaluation period ends. Dr. Kaiser (Melanie Chartoff) confesses to Michael that she is attracted to him. Then Stephanie visits Dr. Kaiser about her shopping addiction, and a verbal catfight ensues.
156	18	"Message from Michael"	Jim Buck	Shelley Zellman	April 24, 1989	8118	20.0	15.3/26
Michael appears as a guest on Vermont Today and briefly becomes a town favorite after expressing his "Let it go!" philosophy.
157	19	"Homes and Jo-Jo"	Michael Lessac	Bob Bendetson & Howard Bendetson	May 1, 1989	8119	18.7	13.9/22
Joanna gets her own TV real estate show, but is surprised to find it comes with a seemingly amorous male co-host (Robert Curtis Brown). Larry's other brother Darryl is gifted a manservant (David Shaughnessy).
158	20	"Georgie and Bess"	Lee Shallat	Dan O'Shannon & Tom Anderson	May 8, 1989	8120	18.8	13.9/21
George's Aunt Bess (Ann Morgan Guilbert) visits the Inn but does not seem to be the kind of woman he remembered. Dick and Larry's brother Darryl begin a game of chess. In black-and-white sequences, Tom Poston plays his own father, with Jason Marin as the young George. The Inn's basement makes an appearance. Michael gets a new job at a grocery store.
159	21	"Murder at the Stratley"	Michael Lessac	Billy Van Zandt & Jane Milmore	May 15, 1989	8121	16.9	12.6/20
As a change of pace, Dick writes a murder mystery, with characters closely resembling his wife and the townspeople. After Joanna leaves to visit her ailing mother, other story elements appear to be coming true, and the town suspects Dick of murdering Joanna. During a rainstorm, Chester reports that the Thomas Hill Bridge is out. (Thomas Hill plays Chester's friend Jim.) Alvy Moore has a cameo as a deliveryman. The frost on Michael and Stephanie's relationship begins to thaw.
160	22	"Malling in Love Again"	Dick Martin	Bob Bendetson & Shelley Zellman	May 22, 1989	8122	17.5	13.3/21
Michael and Stephanie conduct personal interviews at the mall and realize that they're perfect together after all. Johnny Carson appears as himself, a friend of Larry, Darryl and Darryl. Linda Sorenson plays a waitress. Steven Culp as Brett. Craig Bierko as Dirk. J. J. Wall in the first of three appearances as "Floyd D. Barber". Jane Milmore as a Stephanie clone.

=== Season 8 (1989–90) ===
No. overall	No. in season	Title	Directed by	Written by	Original release date	Prod. code	U.S. viewers (millions)
161	1	"Don't Worry Be Pregnant"	Dick Martin	Bob Bendetson	September 18, 1989	9101	18.2
Michael and a pregnant Stephanie return from a six-month honeymoon cruise totally unprepared for parenthood. J.J. Wall as mall security officer Floyd D. Barber.
162	2	"Get Dick"	Peter Baldwin	Nell Scovell	September 25, 1989	9103	17.1
Dick accidentally burns down Maison Hubert while enjoying an after-dinner cigar. The Loudons take in Hubert while he recuperates. Hubert (I.M. Hobson) vows he will "get Monsieur Loudon".
163	3	"Poetry and Pastries"	Michael Lessac	Michele Gendelman & Ellen Herman	October 2, 1989	9102	14.4
Dick is chosen to judge the annual Poetry and Pastry contest. Miss Goddard, the reigning champion, uses her feminine wiles to try to influence the judging. Michael throws an all-male baby shower.
164	4	"Utley Exposed"	Dick Martin	Howard Bendetson	October 16, 1989	9105	17.1
An episode of Vermont Today on 'Hidden Shame' nets a surprise guest when George admits to a childish prank. Ellen Albertini Dow as a townsperson.
165	5	"Ramblin' Michael Harris"	David Steinberg	Mark Egan & Mark Solomon	October 23, 1989	9106	18.0
Michael quits his job at the grocery store to become a lounge singer.
166	6	"Meet Michael Vanderkellen"	Stephen C. Grossman	Brad Isaacs	November 13, 1989	9104	17.2
Stephanie's mother offers to buy the newlyweds a mansion, but only if Michael changes his last name to Vanderkellen. Priscilla Morrill's final appearance as Marian Vanderkellen.
167	7	"Good Lord Loudon"	Dick Martin	Brad Isaacs	November 20, 1989	9108	18.8
A cash-strapped visiting dignitary (Tony Jay) makes Dick a royal Lord. After hearing of his good fortune, the townspeople's opinion of Dick jumps up a notch (temporarily), and Stephanie and Michael choose Dick as the baby's godfather. David Pressman as the shoe salesman. Ellen Albertini Dow as a townsperson.
168	8	"Cupcake in a Cage"	Lee Shallat	Bob Bendetson & Howard Bendetson	December 4, 1989	9111	20.2
Stephanie is sent to jail after she slaps a security guard in a fit of prenatal hormones. Chip Zien as a harried guest. J.J. Wall as mall security guard "Floyd D. Barber".
169	9	"Attack of the Killer Aunt"	Michael Lessac	Bill Fuller & Jim Pond	December 11, 1989	9107	20.5
Joanna's aunt, Louise (Nancy Walker), visits bearing gifts, despite her long-standing opinion that Joanna is much too good for Dick. Larry, Darryl & Darryl buy a Rolls-Royce. John McCook plays Joanna's old flame.
170	10	"I Like You, Butt..."	David Steinberg	Renee Phillips & Carrie Honigblum	December 18, 1989	9109	21.5
George meets the perfect girl (Jan Cobler), except for her large rear end. Michael and Stephanie consult with a baby naming guru (Keene Curtis).
171	11	"Jumpin' George"	Michael Lessac	Brad Isaacs & Nell Scovell	January 1, 1990	9112	23.7
George plans on never sleeping again when he's plagued by a recurring nightmare. Michael and Stephanie use 'wombphones' to educate their future child. Melanie Chartoff as the therapist. Peggy Fleming has a cameo as herself.
172	12	"Lights, Camera, Contractions!"	Michael Lessac	Mark Egan & Mark Solomon & Bob Bendetson	January 8, 1990	9114	26.8
It is baby time for the Harrises as Steph's baby is about to be born. Michael is determined to capture the birth on tape over Stephanie's objections. This episode concludes with a montage of characters from other popular CBS TV shows of 1990: Jean Smart of Designing Women, Patrick Duffy of Dallas, Gerald McRaney of Major Dad and Angela Lansbury of Murder She Wrote, all of them parroting "I think Michael and Stephanie will make wonderful parents" for Michael's camcorder video.
173	13	"Beauty and the Pest"	David Steinberg	Michele Gendelman & Ellen Herman	January 15, 1990	9110	21.6
Joanna's real estate show lands her an odd client (Tim Choate) who can't seem to commit to buying a house, until a surprise visit to his home reveals a shrine to Joanna. Stephanie and Michael invite the entire town to view their new baby, "little Stephanie". Mike is upset that the baby cries when he holds her, but discovers that she can be "bought".
174	14	"Good Neighbor Sam"	Lee Shallat	Nell Scovell	January 29, 1990	9115	18.3
Dick reluctantly spends time with Sam (Bill Daily), a depressed guest at the Inn, who then unexpectedly buys the house next door. The townsfolk, who all assume Dick is their best friend, are in an uproar when they hear that Dick and Sam are "best friends."
175	15	"Child in Charge"	Dick Martin	David Lerner	February 5, 1990	9113	19.8
Stephanie's parents buy WPIV for baby Stephanie. Dick refuses to pander to the child, forcing baby Steph to cancel Vermont Today in the middle of an interview with George McGovern.
176	16	"Seein' Double"	Dick Martin	Bob Bendetson	February 19, 1990	9116	17.1
Michael announces plans to spice up WPIV's lineup with a new sitcom, Seein' Double, starring Stephanie as identical twins Judy and Jody, with Dick as their crotchety widowed father. Don Knotts makes a brief appearance as one of the sitcom's characters.
177	17	"Born to Be Mild"	Peter Baldwin	Bob Bendetson & Howard Bendetson	February 26, 1990	9118	18.2
Dick is roped into joining George's old gang, the Hooligans, when they reunite after 40 years apart. Dick leads them into a rumble against their long-time rivals, the Ruffians.
178	18	"Daddy's Little Girl"	Michael Lessac	Brad Isaacs	March 5, 1990	9119	17.9
After another shopping spree for baby Steph, Dick teaches Michael that materialism isn't the best way to raise a child. A skeptical Michael becomes convinced after a haunting dream depicts a possible future. Julia Duffy plays the grown-up baby Steph.
179	19	"Georgie and Grace"	Peter Scolari	Jim Pond & Bill Fuller	March 19, 1990	9117	17.4
George falls under the influence of five priests vacationing at the Inn. After George announces his intention to join the priesthood, Miss Goddard tries her best to change his mind. James Hampton, George O. Petrie and Tom Virtue play priests.
180	20	"Handymania"	Jim Buck	Nell Scovell & Brad Isaacs and Jim Pond & Bill Fuller	April 9, 1990	9121	18.6
George is the toast of the town when he invents a hot new board game called "Handyman". Kenneth Tigar plays a tough-acting toy store manager.
181	21	"Dick and Tim"	Michael Lessac	Bob Bendetson	April 30, 1990	9122	18.0
Dick finagles his way into a weekly poker game with Tim Conway. Unaware of Tim's cheap nature, Dick drives him away after raising a quarter. Joanna and Stephanie make an effort to keep Miss Goddard from being alone on her birthday. Audrie Neenan plays a waitress.
182	22	"Father Goose"	Stephen C. Grossman	Story by : Mark Egan & Mark Solomon; Teleplay by : Brad Isaacs & Nell Scovell	May 7, 1990	9123	17.6
Michael comes up with the perfect lead-in to Vermont Today, the Giddy Goose show. He casts his favorite dinner theater actor (Henry Gibson) as Giddy, only to discover the man's also his father. George Innes plays another actor who auditions for the Giddy role.
183	23	"My Husband, My Peasant"	Dick Martin	Jerry Lacy	May 14, 1990	9120	20.0
Society bluebloods Scooter Drake (Alex Hyde-White) and his new wife, Libby (Randall Edwards), drop by with a child of their own, apparently superior to baby Steph in every way. Michael and Stephanie nearly divorce due to Michael's peasant heritage, until some humbling facts about Scooter and Libby's own parentage emerge.
184	24	"The Last Newhart"	Dick Martin	Mark Egan & Mark Solomon & Bob Bendetson	May 21, 1990	9124	29.5
At a town meeting, a Japanese visitor announces his intentions to purchase the entire town and turn the land into a gigantic golf course. Everyone but Dick sells out. In a final twist, the episode is revealed to be a dream by Dr. Robert Hartley, Newhart's character from The Bob Newhart Show. Suzanne Pleshette reprises her role as Emily Hartley in that scene. Lisa Kudrow plays "Sada", one of the three over-talkative wives of Larry, Darryl, and Darryl. Gedde Watanabe, Sab Shimono, Shuko Akune and Rodney Kageyama are among the Japanese contingent.
