= Retroactive continuity =

Literary device in fictional storytelling

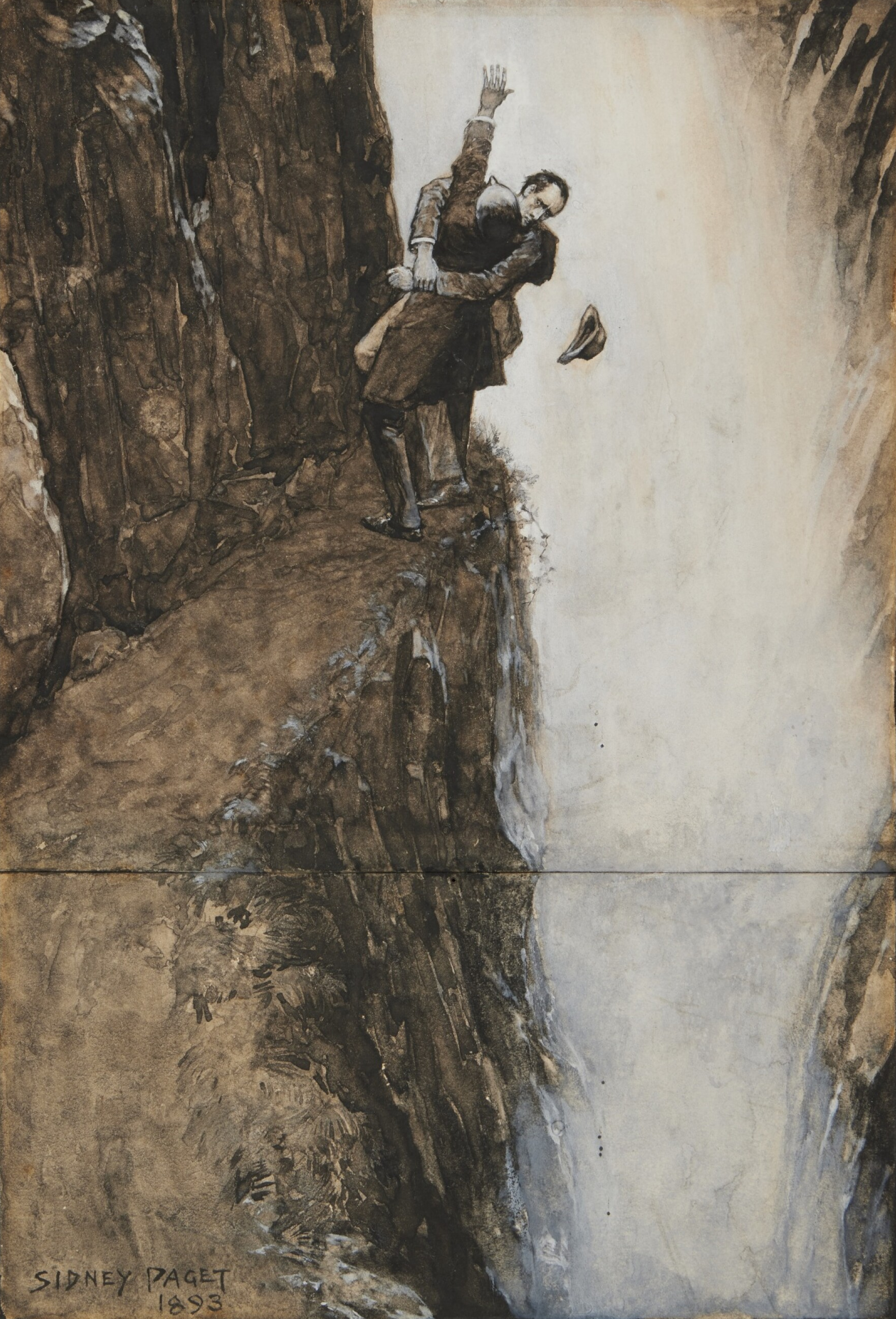
The Death of Sherlock Holmes: Arthur Conan Doyle employed retroactive continuity to explain Sherlock Holmes's return after his death in an earlier story.

Retroactive continuity (retcon) is a literary device in fiction whereby established facts or events in a previously published work are changed in a later work by providing new information that changes the interpretation of the earlier events. "Retcon" is also used as a verb.

There are various motivations for applying retroactive continuity, including:

- to accommodate desired aspects of sequels or derivative works
- to respond to negative fan reception of previous stories
- to correct and overcome errors or problems identified in the prior work since its publication
- to change or clarify how the prior work should be interpreted
- to match reality, when assumptions or projections of the future are later proven wrong

Retcons are common in comic books by long-established publishers such as DC and Marvel. The long history and the number of writers who contribute to stories can often create situations that demand clarification or revision. Retcons have also appeared in manga, soap operas, serial dramas, movie sequels, cartoons, television shows, professional wrestling, video games, radio series, role-playing games, and other forms of serial fiction.

== Origins ==
An early use of the phrase, unrelated to literature, is found in theologian E. Frank Tupper's 1973 book The Theology of Wolfhart Pannenberg: "Pannenberg's conception of retroactive continuity ultimately means that history flows fundamentally from the future into the past, that the future is not basically a product of the past."

The first known use of retroactive continuity referring to the altering of history in a fictional work appeared in the comic All-Star Squadron #18 (February 1983) from DC Comics. In the letters column, a reader remarked that the comic "must make you [the creators] feel at times as if you're painting yourself into a corner", and, "Your matching of Golden Age comics history with new plotlines has been an artistic (and I hope financial!) success." Writer Roy Thomas responded, "We like to think that an enthusiastic ALL-STAR booster at one of Adam Malin's Creation Conventions in San Diego came up with the best name for it a few months back: 'Retroactive Continuity'. Has kind of a ring to it, don't you think?"

== Notable examples ==
A common occasion for the use of retcons is the case of characters who have died but are later revealed to have somehow survived. This is a common practice in horror films, which may end with the death of a monster who goes on to appear in one or more sequels. This technique is so common in superhero comics that the term "comic book death" has been coined for it.

An early example of a retcon is the return of Sherlock Holmes, whom writer Arthur Conan Doyle had killed off in "The Final Problem" in 1893, only to bring him back, in large part because of readers' responses, in "The Empty House" in 1903.

The TV series Dallas annulled its entire ninth season as just the dream of one of its characters, Pam Ewing. Writers did this to offer a plausible reason for the major character Bobby Ewing, who had died onscreen at the end of season eight, to be still alive when actor Patrick Duffy wanted to return to the series. Unfortunately, the Knots Landing spin-off had integrated Bobby's death into their own storyline, and so that show's producers were not willing to reset their series to accommodate Dallas's reset, resulting in the producers cutting ties between the two shows.

Other series including St. Elsewhere, Newhart, and Roseanne have employed the same Dallas technique, with the final episode of Newhart revealing that the entire series was a dream of Newhart's character in The Bob Newhart Show.

In the Star Wars sequel trilogy, extensive retconning occurred in The Rise of Skywalker. Notably, Rey's lineage was changed from her parents being "nobodies" to her being the grandchild of Emperor Palpatine.

=== Additions ===
Retcons sometimes do not contradict previously established facts but instead fill in missing background details, usually to support current plot points. The All-Star Squadron changes mentioned above (Note: The series was set on DC's Earth-Two, an alternative universe in which Golden Age comic characters age in real time. All-Star Squadron was set during World War II on Earth-Two; as it was in the past of an alternative universe, all its events had repercussions on the contemporary continuity of the DC multiverse. Each issue changed the history of the fictional world in which it was set.) referred to retroactive continuity in this sense, as a purely additive process that did not undo any previous work. Kurt Busiek took a similar approach with Untold Tales of Spider-Man, a series which told stories that fit between issues of the original The Amazing Spider-Man series, sometimes explaining discontinuities between those stories. John Byrne used a similar structure in X-Men: The Hidden Years.

Alan Moore's additional information about the Swamp Thing's origins – revealing that Swamp Thing was not actually scientist Alec Holland converted into a plant, but a plant that had absorbed Holland's body and consciousness so that it merely thought it was Holland – did not contradict or change any of the events depicted in the character's previous appearances, but instead changed the reader's interpretation of them.

A similar concept is the secret history, in which the events of a story occur within the bounds of already-established, usually real world, events, revealing different interpretations of the events. Some of Tim Powers's novels are secret histories, such as Last Call, which suggests that Bugsy Siegel's actions were due to his being a modern-day Fisher King.

== See also ==
- Historical revisionism
- Pseudohistory
- Retronym
- Revisionism
