= Into Temptation =

Into Temptation may refer to:

- Into Temptation (film), the 2009 film written and directed by Patrick Coyle
- "Into Temptation" (song), the 1988 song by rock group Crowded House
