= The Demon (South African film) =

1981 South African slasher film

- Theatrical release poster
- Directed by: Percival Rubens
- Written by: Percival Rubens
- Produced by: Percival Rubens; David Dalling
- Starring: Cameron Mitchell; Jennifer Holmes; Craig Gardner; Zoli Marki
- Cinematography: Vincent G. Cox
- Edited by: Patty Farah
- Music by: Nick Labuschagne
- Production companies: Gold Key Entertainment; Hollard Productions; Percival Rubens Films
- Distributed by: Gold Key Entertainment; S.J. International Pictures
- Release date: 1 March 1981 (United States)
- Running time: 94 minutes
- Country: South Africa
- Language: English

The Demon (rereleased in 1985 as Midnight Caller) is a South African slasher film starring Cameron Mitchell and Jennifer Holmes and directed by Percival Rubens. The film's original release date was 1981.

== Plot ==
Fourteen-year-old Emily Parker is kidnapped from her rural home and murdered by a faceless, heavy-breathing maniac with black leather razor-blade tipped gloves. Later, the maniac hitchhikes to the city with a gregarious truck driver. The maniac kills the truck driver, steals his cash, and takes up residence at "Baron Court", a shady tenement hotel in Johannesburg's Doornfontein neighbourhood.

Two months later, Emily's parents, frustrated by the failure of law enforcement officials to either locate Emily or identify her attacker, enlist the help of Bill Carson, a retired United States Marine Corps colonel who now works as a freelance psychic detective. Joan Parker, the distraught mother, needs to know whether Emily is alive or dead, but her husband is preoccupied with revenge and implores Carson to find the man responsible. Carson warns the Parkers that it would be best if they didn't find him.

Meanwhile, for reasons left unclear, the maniac fixates on a young, American teacher, Mary Jones, who shares a two-story bungalow in Johannesburg's Saxonwold neighbourhood with her 18-year-old Afrikaner cousin, Jo. Mary first sees the maniac lurking outside her classroom and later, spying on her at the mall.

When not stalking Mary, the maniac holes up in his hotel room, doing push-ups, growling, and tearing up girly magazines. He also prowls Johannesburg's Hillbrow district at night, attacking various women.

Soon, Jo finds herself embroiled in an affair with wealthy American playboy Dean Turner, much to Mary's chagrin. While Jo is dining, Mary first finds herself threatened by heavy breathing phone calls, and then by menacing knocks at the door. Even her neighbour, Dr. Stuart, turns up with a 38 Special to have a face-down with the attacker, but by then, he has vanished.

Carson continues to assist the Parkers in their search for Emily and the maniac. He produces some crude sketches of the maniac (minus a face), and is able to locate the maniac's hideout. However, Carson warns Mr. Parker that if he attempts to take justice into his own hands, it will end badly. Ignoring his warning, the vengeance-obsessed Mr. Parker confronts the maniac at his hotel. The maniac promptly breaks Mr. Parker's neck, and tosses his lifeless body off a balcony.

Emily's skeleton is finally discovered by children playing in the woods behind her house. Carson visits a now-hostile Joan Parker to offer condolences for both her daughter and husband, and informs her that, "the time of the Demon, our Demon, is drawing close." However, Joan accuses Carson of masterminding the entire thing—the kidnapping and murder of her daughter, her husband's death—as a way to further perpetuate his own career as a hoax psychic. Then she shoots him dead.

That night, Mary and Jo go on respective dates with their significant others while the newly christened "Demon" prepares for his final onslaught. Mary confides to her boyfriend, Bobby, that she has been menaced by a creep hanging around outside her classroom, and possibly stalking her at home at night. Bobby agrees to drive her home. Meanwhile, at Mary's house, the Demon kills Jo and Dean, and then hides, waiting for Mary to come home.

Mary returns to find the place trashed, and Jo murdered. She runs screaming through the house until she comes face to face with the Demon, who has locked all the doors. The Demon pursues Mary up to the attic, where she attempts to escape through a hole in the roof. When that proves futile, she locks herself in a bathroom and devises a booby trap to catch and kill the Demon using a shower nozzle, a bottle of shampoo, and a pair of scissors. When the Demon bursts through the door, he is hit in the face with a blast of hot water. Mary stabs him in the neck with scissors, and he slips on the shampoo and falls into the bathtub, bleeding to death. Mary takes off screaming through the house, just as Bobby and Dr. Stuart arrive to rescue her.

== Cast ==
- Cameron Mitchell as Col. Bill Carson
- Jennifer Holmes as Mary Jones
- Craig Gardner as Dean Turner
- Zoli Marki as Jo
- Peter J. Elliot as Mr. Parker
- Moira Winsow as Joan Parker
- Mark Tanous as Bobby
- George Korelin as Dr. Stuart
- Vera Blacker as Mrs. Stuart
- John Parsonson as The Truck Driver
- Graham "Patches" Kennard as The Demon (billed as Graham Kennard)
- Diane Burmeister
- April Galetti as Girl in Alley
- Amanda Wildman

== Production ==
The film is Rubens's seventh feature. It was shot in 1980 in South Africa. Its working title was Unholy.

== Release ==
Initial release dates for The Demon are contradictory. Some sources list the film's release date as 1979, while other sources list 1980 or 1981, the latter of which was the year for the film's direct-to-video distribution in the United States. The end credits of available versions list "XMCMLXXXI©Hollard productions" (1981), but do not mention if it signifies the film's completion or release date.

The Demon was distributed to some theaters under the title Midnight Caller in 1985, with an advertisement in the Pittsburgh Post-Gazette showing that the movie premiered in their area on March 15, 1985.

== Reception ==
Fred Beldin of AllMovie gave the film a negative review, calling it "dull, dimly lit slasher nonsense". A reviewer for TV Guide gave the film two out of five stars, calling it "lame", stating that the film was "of interest only to Cameron Mitchell devotees". In their podcast, J. A. Kerswell of Hysteria Lives! awarded the film two-and-a-half out of five stars, writing, "The Demon succeeds in being downright freaky. It's not a good film by any means – although, as I pointed out, the final showdown provide some good solid slasher thrills – but, for all its clichés, it goes off at such a tangent that it can't fail but entertain." The Fort Worth Star-Telegram gave the film one star, writing that "At the end we are left with no reason for the killing spree, no reason for Cameron Mitchell to have crossed the atlantic to make this mess, and no reason to have plunked down five bucks at the box office."

The film was also described as a "confusing and bloodless slasher from South Africa" by Jim Harper in his book Legacy of Blood.
