= Misfits of Science =

American television series

- Genre: Comedy-drama; Science fiction; Superhero
- Created by: James D. Parriott
- Starring: Dean Paul Martin; Kevin Peter Hall; Mark Thomas Miller; Courteney Cox; Jennifer Holmes; Max Wright; Mickey Jones
- Theme music composer: Basil Poledouris; Steve Schiff
- Opening theme: "Feels Like Science", performed by Karen Lawrence
- Composer: Basil Poledouris
- Country of origin: United States
- Original language: English
- No. of seasons: 1
- No. of episodes: 16

Production
- Executive producer: James D. Parriott
- Production locations: Universal Studios, Universal City, California
- Running time: 44 minutes
- Production companies: Universal Television; James D. Parriott Productions

Original release
- Network: NBC
- Release: October 4, 1985 – February 28, 1986

Misfits of Science is an American science fiction comedy-drama television series created by James D. Parriott that aired on NBC from October 4, 1985, to February 28, 1986. The series stars Dean Paul Martin as Dr. Billy Hayes, a research scientist at the fictional Humanidyne Institute who recruits a team of superpowered individuals, including Kevin Peter Hall as a scientist who can shrink himself, Mark Thomas Miller as a rock musician with electrical powers, and Courteney Cox, in her first main television role, as a telekinetic teenager.

== Plot ==
The series featured super-powered humans and their madcap adventures. The team is formed by Dr. Billy Hayes, a research scientist at the Humanidyne Institute who specializes in "human anomalies". He works with shrinking Dr. Elvin "El" Lincoln, and together they recruit electrically powered Johnny Bukowski, a rock-and-roll musician, and Gloria Dinallo, a telekinetic teenager.

== Production ==
A double-length TV pilot and 15 additional episodes were produced; however, one episode did not air before the show was cancelled due to low ratings.

The name "Misfits of Science" and other conceptual ideas were the brainchild of then-president of NBC Entertainment, Brandon Tartikoff. He explained of the series "We'll rely on the National Enquirer for story ideas. It's loosely inspired by the dynamics we saw in Ghostbusters... sort of a kick-back, Friday type of show."

The ninth episode was the first paid writing job for Tim Kring, who later originated and produced the thematically similar Heroes in 2006.

=== Title sequence ===
The main title sequence and its theme song were unusual for TV shows of the era. Donald Todd, head writer and story editor, described them as follows:

The main titles are fun. It's still kind of... it's really forward-looking. Jim [Parriott] was forward-looking in many ways, and we fought a lot about that, but it starts off with Bobby Short doing the theme, and then there's the kicking over of the TV and into the more contemporary version of the theme. He was trying to say, "We're not doing that show, we're doing this show, and it's more hip." And I remember the people at Universal going, "Why don't you do it without the TV? We don't like the TV!" And I don't think they gave him the budget for it. I think we had to find it ourselves. It's a really cheap thing, it's just a guy playing piano and then a foot kicking over a TV, but it was really controversial, because back then nobody did anything interesting with the main titles. You just showed the characters sliding into frame. But I remember that was pretty cool. And Jim wrote it.

== Cast and characters ==
- Dean Paul Martin as Dr. Billy Hayes, the leader of the team (who has no superpowers). He is a young research scientist at the Humanidyne Institute who specializes in "human anomalies" and a fast-talking but good-hearted schemer full of boyish enthusiasm who often gets the team into as much trouble as he gets them out of. Although easily distracted whenever an attractive woman walks by, he is honestly interested in getting involved in a serious relationship with Jane Miller even after she showed up pregnant by another man.
- Kevin Peter Hall as Dr. Elvin "El" Lincoln, Billy's colleague and close friend. He has the ability to shrink for minutes at a time from his height of 7 ft 4 in (224 cm) to 11 in (28 cm) via hormonal treatments which he activates by pressing a nerve on the back of his neck. A recurring joke after such transformations is that he always has to put on the tiny change of clothes he carries with him for his small size. The character is shy and struggles socially, and despite being so tall, he is a very bad basketball player.
- Mark Thomas Miller as Johnny "Johnny B" Bukowski, a rock and roll musician who was electrically shocked on stage which resulted in disturbing electrical powers. He continually drains any electrically charged items in his surroundings, forcing him to live in isolation. He wears sunglasses because his eyes glow when he is fully charged. He can throw lightning bolts forcefully and run at superhuman speed, easily outracing in one episode a parody of the Six Million Dollar Man, but he is vulnerable to water which short-circuits him and burns his skin. He is a big Chuck Berry fan.
- Courteney Cox as Gloria Dinallo, a troubled telekinetic teenager with a history of juvenile delinquency and a mother in a mental institution who claims Gloria's father is from outer space. She has a crush on Johnny. Gloria can only use her telekinesis on things that she can see: using a blindfold on her renders her powerless.
- Diane Civita as Miss Nance, the scientists' secretary. Although she usually seems more interested in doing her nails, going on her coffee break, and watching her soap operas, she is actually the one who keeps their department running and is always there at the end of the series to turn off the lights and say goodnight to the rabbits in their cages.
- Jennifer Holmes as Jane Miller, Gloria's probation officer. Although attracted to Billy, she is often put off by his eccentric behavior. Her character appears only in the earlier episodes, disappearing after the first 7 episodes. (Although Holmes is still in the opening credits through episode 12.)
- Max Wright as Dick Stetmeyer, the uptight director of the Humanidyne Institute. Unlike the other cast members, he isn't actually considered to be one of the Misfits.
- Mickey Jones as Arnold "Beef"/"Ice Man" Beifneiter, who got his power to freeze anything he touches from placing himself in an experimental cryogenic cold storage unit back in the year of 1937 due to grief caused by the loss of his beloved Amelia Earhart. The team drives around in an ice cream truck (International Metro Mite M-800) because the lumbering and now rather simple-minded Ice Man dies if he gets too warm, so they keep him in the freezer. Beef only appears in the pilot episode due to legal objections from Marvel Comics, who publish a similarly named character in X-Men, but the characters continue to use the ice cream truck.

== Episodes ==
No.	Title	Directed by	Written by	Original release date	Prod. code
1	"Deep Freeze"	James D. Parriott	James D. Parriott	October 4, 1985	83516
90-minute series pilot: Billy and El, scientists for the Human Investigation Team, put together a team of super-powered individuals to deal with a secret government project to create a neutron beam cannon. Larry Linville and Edward Winter guest star.
2	"Your Place or Mayan?"	Alan J. Levi	Donald Todd	October 18, 1985	60803
On behalf of a dead friend of Billy's, an archaeologist, the Misfits set out to prove the existence of buried Mayan treasure beneath Beverly Hills.
3	"Guess What's Coming to Dinner?"	Burt Brinckerhoff	Morrie Ruvinsky	October 25, 1985	60802
A friend of the Misfits claims to have made contact with aliens from Mars. Problems arise when the authorities try to prevent him from continuing his contact.
4	"Lost Link"	Christopher Leitch	Mark Jones	November 1, 1985	60806
A primitive in a loin cloth comes ashore at Venice Beach and no one knows who he is — in fact it's believed he may be a caveman. It turns out that the man, "Link," is in fact an Aborigine from a lost tribe in New Guinea and the Misfits help him to set free the spirit of his deceased child by placing a small totem aboard the space shuttle.
5	"Sort of Looking for Gina"	Jeffrey Hayden	Michael Cassutt	November 8, 1985	60804
Johnny's efforts to get a date with an attractive woman, Gina, go amiss when it turns out she's involved with crooks and the Misfits have to mastermind a bank robbery to help her out.
6	"Sonar… and Yet So Far"	Burt Brinckerhoff	Donald Todd	November 15, 1985	60807
A marine biologist and friend of Billy's who works with dolphins believes they can talk, making him the target of drug smugglers who need the help of his dolphin friends to recover a sunken cache of cocaine.
7	"Steer Crazy"	John Tracy	James D. Parriott	November 29, 1985	60801
A trio of senior citizens end up with super-powers from irradiated hamburgers, and the Misfits have to both help them out and restrain them from injuring themselves.
8	"Fumble on the One"	Bob Sweeney	Blaze Forrester	December 6, 1985	60811
The Misfits assist Brick Tyler, a part-bionic CIA agent (and Billy's college friend) who has managed to lose the "football" — the President's briefcase containing the nation's nuclear launch codes.
9	"Twin Engines"	Burt Brinckerhoff	Story by : R. Timothy Kring; Teleplay by : Donald Todd	December 13, 1985	60808
Johnny's friend Lonnie (Joel Polis) begins having premonitions of danger, but it turns out in fact he's related to his previously unknown twin Dwayne, a motorcycle racer, and the Misfits have to help them both out.
10	"Grand Theft Bunny"	Michael Switzer	Pamela Norris	December 27, 1985	60810
Bad guys manipulate the Misfits into helping them unleash a plague on Los Angeles with the help of a contaminated rabbit.
11	"Grand Elusion"	Bernard McEveety	Morrie Ruvinsky	January 10, 1986	60812
Billy recruits the gang to help a fellow scientist's daughter defect when she and her father tour America as part of a Russian girl's gymnast team. The gang takes the place of the magician hired to perform for the tour thanks to a judicious use of super-powers, but the daughter refuses to leave without her father. Complicating matters, the KGB minder Galenkov has sworn to make sure the scientist Nikolai never gets away. The Misfits have to pull off an elaborate bait-and-switch to make sure that both Nikolai and Tatyana manage to escape.
12	"Once Upon a Night"	Barbara Peeters	Linda Campanelli & M.M. Shelly Moore	January 17, 1986	60813
Gloria's pen pal Jaye is the object of a hunt by unknown assailants. Gloria is kidnapped.
13	"Center of Attention"	Burt Brinckerhoff	Sara Parriott	January 31, 1986	60817
El goes undercover as an incredibly talented basketball player (with some help from Gloria) to expose a crooked owner who is having his players throw their games.
14	"Against All Oz"	Michael Switzer	Morrie Ruvinsky	February 7, 1986	60819
Suffering exhaustion, Billy takes a nap and wakes up in an alternate reality, believing his adventures with the Misfits were a dream. Clips from prior episodes are shown as he tells his co-workers at a nuclear project of their counterparts in the dream.
15	"The Avenging Angel"	Bernard McEveety	Dan Distefano	February 21, 1986	60816
Gloria helps out an aspiring pro wrestler with the use of her telekinetic powers without telling him; the wrestler, Milt, soon decides he does have super powers and Gloria needs to keep helping him out when he decides to go after crooks trying to sell him protection.
16	"Three Days of the Blender"	Michael Switzer	Donald Todd	February 28, 1986	60814
When a blender is accidentally delivered to Billy, he ends up getting arrested as a spy and Stetmeyer gets targeted by the FBI.

== International broadcast ==
In France, the series was known as Superminds, in Germany, as Die Spezialisten unterwegs (The Specialists On The Way), in Brazil, as "Curto-Circuito" ("Short Circuit"), in Mexico, Colombia, Peru and rest of Latin America as Los Cientificos Rebeldes (The Rebel Scientists).

== DVD releases ==
On January 25, 2008, the series was released in Germany as a 5-disc DVD box set (Region 2) with all episodes (including the final episode, which was originally unaired on NBC, but broadcast in foreign markets) with both English and German audios and German subtitles. The release was entitled Die Spezialisten Unterwegs (lit. 'The Specialists On The Go').

On September 19, 2012, the series was released on DVD in France as Superminds.
