= Bruce A. Young =

American actor (born 1956)

- Born: April 22, 1956 (age 69); Wilmette, Illinois, U.S.
- Occupations: Actor; screenwriter
- Years active: 1981–present

Bruce Arlington Young (born April 22, 1956) is an American television, film, and stage actor and screenwriter.

== Career ==
Young is well known for his role as Cascade Police Captain Simon Banks in the hit popular UPN/CTV science fiction police drama The Sentinel, alongside Richard Burgi, and Garrett Maggart. Young also had roles in the films Risky Business, Jurassic Park III, The Color of Money, Basic Instinct, Into Temptation, Undisputed, and Enough. His other television roles include parts in 21 Jump Street, E/R, Highlander: The Series, Quantum Leap, NYPD Blue, The X-Files, Cold Case, Lady Blue, Ghost Whisperer, Grey's Anatomy and Prison Break.

As television writer and screenwriter, Young has written for such television series and films as E/R and The Lord Protector: The Riddle of the Chosen.

From 1983 to 1987, while with the Organic Theater Company in Chicago, Young created, produced and was a cast member in "Dungeon Master", a fusion of improvisational theatre and live action role-playing; each show was a fantasy adventure scenario with theater cast members playing the monsters and non-player characters and volunteer audience members serving as the player characters. Young restarted Dungeon Master in Los Angeles in 2001, where it is still active, although Young stopped active participation in 2006.

== Filmography ==
- Thief (1981) as Mechanic #2
- Risky Business (1983) as Jackie
- Nothing in Common (1986) as Gene
- The Color of Money (1986) as Moselle
- 227 (1987, TV Series) as Mop
- 21 Jump Street (1987, TV Series) as Sgt. James Adabo
- L.A. Law (1989, TV Series) as Edward Rice
- Hooperman (1989, TV Series) as Sully
- An Innocent Man (1989) as Jingles
- Cop Rock (1990, TV Series) as Lawyer
- Father Dowling Mysteries (1991, TV Series) as Red
- Quantum Leap (1991, TV Series) as Butch
- Hot Shots! (1991) as "Red" Herring
- Basic Instinct (1992) as Andrews
- The Golden Palace (1992, TV Series) as George Wilson
- Trespass (1992) as Raymond
- Highlander: The Series (1993–1996, TV Series) as Carl Robinson
- Blink (1994) as Lt. Mitchell
- Naked Gun 33 1/3: The Final Insult (1994) as Tyrone (uncredited)
- The War (1994) as Moe Henry
- The X-Files (1995, TV Series. Episode: "Fresh Bones") as Pierre Bauvais
- The Tie That Binds (1995) as Gil Chandler
- Normal Life (1996) as Agent Parker
- The Sentinel (1996 - 1999, TV series) as Capt. Simon Banks
- Phenomenon (1996) as FBI Agent Jack Hatch
- Viper (1997, TV Series) as The Administrator
- Diagnosis Murder (1999, TV Series) as The Rapper
- Angel on Abbey Street (1999) as Muskat
- The Drew Carey Show (2000, TV Series) as Simon Nichols
- Jurassic Park III (2001) as M. B. Nash
- Becker (2002, TV Series) as Officer Matlin
- Family Law (2002, TV Series) as Judge Leon Carter
- The District (2002, TV Series) as Carl Orchard
- Enough (2002) as Self-Defense Trainer
- Undisputed (2002) as Charles Soward
- Ticker (2002, Short) as Bodyguard
- The Guardian (2002-2003 TV Series) as Albert Gregg
- Boomtown (2003 TV Series)
- Home on the Range (2004) additional voices
- NYPD Blue (2004, TV Series) as Leonard Peeler
- Cold Case (2004, TV Series) as Daryl Booker
- Edmond (2005) as Police Officer
- Grey's Anatomy (2005, TV Series) as Tom Maynard
- The Unit (2006, TV Series) as Dr. Jimmy Willey
- Prison Break (2005–2006, TV Series) as C.O. #2
- Love Is the Drug (2006) as Phill Hackwith
- Ghost Whisperer (2007, TV Series) as Chad West
- The Beast (2009, TV Series) as Ed Marcus
- Into Temptation (2009) as Lloyd Montag
- The Next Three Days (2010) as Craftsman in Elevator (uncredited)
- Star Trek: Renegades (2015, TV Series) as Borrada
