= The Lord Protector: The Riddle of the Chosen =

- Directed by: Ryan Carroll
- Written by: Stacey Upton; Bruce A. Young
- Produced by: Roland Carroll; Rene Torres
- Starring: Patrick Cassidy; Olivia Hussey; Jay Underwood
- Narrated by: Charlton Heston
- Cinematography: Irv Goodnoff
- Edited by: Russ Kingston
- Music by: Vladimir Horunzhy
- Distributed by: Trinity Home Entertainment
- Release date: 1996
- Running time: 90 minutes
- Country: United States
- Language: English

The Lord Protector: The Riddle of the Chosen is a 1996 fantasy film starring Patrick Cassidy and directed by Ryan Carroll. The film was released under the alternate title The Dark Mist.

Comedy podcast RiffTrax (Michael J. Nelson, Bill Corbett and Kevin Murphy) recorded and released a riff in 2025.

== Plot ==
In a medieval world The Lord Protector must save the Earth from destruction and solve The Riddle of the Chosen. The Lord Protector gathers companions and travels to the heart of a magical evil and sets the stage for the ultimate showdown between good and evil.
