= The Last Newhart =

- Newhart episode
- Episode no.: Season 8 Episode 24
- Directed by: Dick Martin
- Written by: Mark Egan, Mark Solomon & Bob Bendetson
- Original air date: May 21, 1990

Episode chronology
← Previous "My Husband, My Peasant"	Next → —
- Newhart season 8

"The Last Newhart" is the 24th episode of the eighth season and the 184th overall episode and final episode of the CBS sitcom Newhart. It first aired in the United States on 21 May 1990.

Cited by TV Land as one of the most memorable series finales in television history, the series is ultimately revealed to be a dream by Dr. Robert Hartley, the lead character from Bob Newhart's earlier sitcom The Bob Newhart Show, which had ended four years before Newhart aired. The ending has been parodied frequently since it aired.

== Plot ==
The entire town is purchased by a visiting Japanese tycoon, who turns the hamlet into an enormous golf course and recreation resort. Dick and Joanna are the only townspeople who refuse to sell. The others accept million-dollar payoffs and leave in a farewell scene that parodies Fiddler on the Roof.

Five years later, Dick and Joanna continue to run the Stratford Inn, which is now located in the middle of the golf course. Several other townspeople unexpectedly return for a reunion. During the party the two Darryls also speak for the first time on screen, yelling "Quiet!" at their wives in unison. Dick gets frustrated with the increasingly chaotic scene and storms out, shouting "You're all crazy!", only to be knocked out by an errant golf ball.

The scene shifts to nighttime in the bedroom of Dr. Bob Hartley (Newhart's character on The Bob Newhart Show) and his wife Emily (Suzanne Pleshette). Bob awakens, upset, and he wakes Emily to tell her about the very strange dream he has just had: that he was an innkeeper in a small Vermont town filled with eccentric characters. Emily tells Bob "that settles it — no more Japanese food before you go to bed." Bob mentions his marriage to a "beautiful blonde," and that Emily should wear more sweaters (in reference to Mary Frann's form-fitting tops) before the credits roll.

Several references are made to Newhart's former show, including the use of its theme song and credits. Although the Bob Newhart Show theme was missing from the final closing credit shot in the series' initial syndication run, the theme has been reinstated in the current version syndicated by 20th Century Fox Television. The MTM cat logo normally closed the show's end credits with Newhart voicing-over the "meow", but for the finale, the cat's voice was Darryl and Darryl yelling "Quiet!"

== Development of the episode ==
Entertainment Weekly stated in 1995 that Newhart's wife Ginny had conceived the idea for the finale, but the show's executive producers, Mark Egan, Mark Solomon, and Bob Bendetson, denied this in a letter to the editor, "[T]he final episode of Newhart was not 'dreamed up' by Bob's wife, Ginny. She had absolutely no connection with the show. ... We wrote and produced the Emmy-nominated script (with special thanks to Dan O'Shannon)."

In Newhart's 2006 book I Shouldn't Even Be Doing This! And Other Things that Strike Me as Funny, he confirmed that his wife had indeed proposed the ending of Newhart, which had been developed by the show's writers. He reiterated this in a 2013 interview, saying,

That was Ginnie's idea. ... She said, 'You ought to end in a dream sequence because there was so much inexplicable about the show.' She said, 'You should wake up in bed with Susie and explain what's so—" and I said, 'What a great idea,' and I gave the idea to the writers and they fleshed it out with the Japanese buying the town and our not selling."

Suzanne Pleshette, in a Television Academy interview, also said that the idea was Ginny's, having heard it from her over dinner with the Newharts several years before the finale was shot.

Interviews with Newhart, Pleshette, and director Dick Martin reveal that the final scene was kept a secret from the cast and most of the crew. A fake ending was written to throw off the tabloids that involved Dick Loudon going to heaven after being hit with a golf ball and talking to God, played by George Burns or George C. Scott. Pleshette was kept hidden until her scene was shot. When the scene began, many people in the live audience recognized the bedroom set from The Bob Newhart Show and burst into spontaneous applause. Pleshette and Newhart performed the scene in one take.

== Reception of the finale ==
In November 2005, the series finale was named by TV Guide and TV Land as the most unexpected moment in TV history. The episode was watched by 29.5 million US viewers, bringing in an 18.7/29 rating/share, and ranking as the most-watched program that week.

In 2011, the finale was ranked number four on the TV Guide Network special, TV's Most Unforgettable Finales, and in 2013 was ranked number 19 in Entertainment Weekly's 25 Best TV Series Finales Ever.

== In popular culture ==
In 1991, the cast of The Bob Newhart Show reunited in a primetime special. In one scene, Bob and Emily's neighbor Howard Borden (Bill Daily) quipped that he had dreamed about living for years as an astronaut, as scenes were shown of Daily in his earlier role as astronaut Roger Healey on I Dream of Jeannie. At the end of the special, Bob Hartley gets on the elevator, where he encounters three workmen: Larry, Darryl, and Darryl.

On the February 11, 1995, episode of Saturday Night Live, which was hosted by Bob Newhart, the closing sketch ended with a redux of Newhart's final scene, in which Bob Hartley again wakes with his wife Emily (special guest Suzanne Pleshette) and tells her that he had just had another strange dream, this time it was hosting Saturday Night Live. Emily responds, "Saturday Night Live, is that show still on?"—this during a period when SNL was heavily criticized for its declining quality.

In 2010, Jimmy Kimmel Live! presented several parody alternate endings to the television show Lost, one of which mirrored the finale of Newhart, complete with a cameo appearance by Bob Newhart and with Lost star Evangeline Lilly in place of Emily/Pleshette.

The final scene with Newhart and Pleshette was later parodied in an alternate ending to the television series Breaking Bad, where star Bryan Cranston wakes from a dream next to his Malcolm in the Middle co-star Jane Kaczmarek, and they assume their respective roles of Hal and Lois. Hal recounts the events of Breaking Bad in humorous fashion as though he is horrified that he could do those things, albeit as Walter White. Lois asks Hal to not eat deep-fried Twinkies before bed next time before reassuring him that everything is all right, and the final shot is of Walter's hat.

The final scene of The Late Late Show with Craig Ferguson parodied this as well. After revealing that Bob Newhart had been playing the on-set pantomime horse Secretariat, Ferguson wakes up as his The Drew Carey Show character Nigel Wick, in bed with his sham civil partner, named and played by Drew Carey. The two then discuss the crazy possibility of Wick being a talk show host and Carey losing weight and becoming a game show host. (The shot continued with a parody of the twist ending of St. Elsewhere and then the closing song from The Sopranos finale.)

In "The Finale", the last episode of What We Do in the Shadows, a comedy horror mockumentary fantasy TV show, one of the alternate endings features the characters Guillermo and Nandor waking up in bed and discussing the entire plot of the show as a dream.
