= John Voldstad =

American actor

- Born: February 20, 1951 (age 75); Oslo, Norway
- Education: Birmingham High School
- Occupation: Actor
- Years active: 1975-2017
- Spouse: Kellye Fowler (m. 1990)
- Children: 1 son

John Ole Voldstad (born February 20, 1951) is an American television and film actor best known for his role as one of the brothers Darryl on Newhart. He played "my other brother Darryl", the one with the curlier, lighter colored hair.

== Life and career ==
Born in Oslo, Norway, Voldstad moved with his mother to the United States when he was 10 months old, after his parents went their separate ways. His first role was in a play at age 8. After graduating from Birmingham High School in Van Nuys, California, Voldstad studied acting in London.

He lived in Minnesota and Texas before moving to California to pursue acting. His first role was in Switchblade Sisters. Voldstad went to high school with the daughter of Hal Kanter, who got him roles in Bluffers (with Bob Hope) and Chico and the Man. Voldstad also had roles in Stripes and The Blue and the Gray. In 1993, he also appeared in Leprechaun with Warwick Davis. In 2003 he had a small role in the Robert Duvall and Kevin Costner movie Open Range as a deputy Marshal.

Of his role in Newhart, Voldstad said he and Tony Papenfuss, who played the other brother who never talked, came up with imaginary scripts that represented what the brothers were thinking. The casting director "knew we could look like we weren't just standing there. We could look like we had something going on in our minds."

After Newhart, Voldstad toured with his co-stars William Sanderson and Papenfuss. Later he worked at country radio station WQSB in Albertville, Alabama. He moved to Rock Hill, South Carolina, with his son, hoping to benefit from a television series being filmed in the area. His friend Buz McKim is a historian at the NASCAR Hall of Fame in Charlotte, North Carolina, where Voldstad currently works on the visitors service staff. Voldstad also continues to act and appear at conventions along with Papenfuss. Voldstad said, "I talk to him pretty regularly. Me and Tony are like brothers." Asked about what people want when they meet him, Voldstad said, "Just to see if Darryl talks."

In 1990, Voldstad married Kellye Fowler in a ceremony attended by Linda Hamilton and his TV brothers along with 700 others. He has a son Christiaan, born in the early 1990s, who has made an oil painting of the three Newhart brothers.
