= William Henry Porter (writer) =

American minister and author (1817–1861)

William Henry Porter (Sept 19, 1817 – May 26, 1861) was an American minister and writer.

He was born in Rye, New Hampshire, Sept 19, 1817, and was one of the eighteen children of Rev Huntington Porter, formerly pastor of the church in that place. After a preliminary course of study in Phillips Academy, Andover, Massachusetts, he entered Yale College in 1837, with his twin brother, Charles Henry Porter, who died after completing his Sophomore year. He graduated in 1841.

He studied Theology one year in the Union Theological Seminary in New York City, one year in the Theological Department of Yale College, and a few months at Lynn, Massachusetts, under the instruction of his father. In the Spring of 1844 he was licensed to preach On October 19, 1845, he was ordained as minister of a Presbyterian church in Litchfield, New Hampshire, where he remained as pastor until he was separated from the congregation on October 28, 1848; ceasing thereafter to serve as a minister. From 1854 through 1857 he served as clerk in Boston Custom House.

In 1851 he united with the New Jerusalem, or Swedenborgian Society, in Boston, Mass. He published Common and Scriptural Proverbs Compared, 1845, and The Heavenly Union, or New Jerusalem on Earth 1850.

On May 19, 1844, he married Miss Mary Frances, daughter of Hon. Paul Wentworth, of New Hampshire. He had several children, the eldest of whom, a daughter, died in 1850. He died in Roxbury, Massachusetts. May 26, 1861, aged 43.
