= Jennifer Holmes (actress) =

American television actress

- Occupation: Actress
- Years active: 1979–present

Jennifer Holmes is an American television actress.

== Career ==
Holmes is best known for her role as Leslie Vanderkellen, a wealthy, world-class skier who takes the job of hotel maid, on the first season of Newhart. She left the show after the first season and was replaced by Julia Duffy, who portrayed Leslie's cousin Stephanie Vanderkellen for the remainder of the show's run.

Holmes also appeared in the 1979 slasher film The Demon, starring Cameron Mitchell, and acted opposite Mitchell again in the 1982 film Raw Force. She also appeared in the TV movie versions of Hobson's Choice (1983) and Samson and Delilah (1984). In 1985, she starred in Misfits of Science, a short-lived television series about a group of superheroes who fight crime for a scientific think tank.

In the 1980s, Holmes was also a guest on many television shows, including Knight Rider, The Fall Guy, The Rockford Files, Lou Grant, Fame, Webster, The Love Boat, Murder, She Wrote, Hart to Hart, Voyagers!, as Mandy Jo on The Dukes of Hazzard and Tales of the Unexpected.

== Filmography ==
=== Film ===
| Year | Title | Role | Notes |
|---|---|---|---|
| 1979 | The Demon | Mary | |
| 1982 | Raw Force | Ann Davis | |
| 1992 | Life on the Edge | Karen Nelson | |
| 2013 | Thy Will Be Done | Connie | |
| 2022 | The Disappearance of Toby Blackwood | Denise Crowley | |

=== Television ===
| Year | Title | Role | Notes |
|---|---|---|---|
| 1979 | The Rockford Files | Amy | Episode: "Never Send a Boy King to Do a Man's Job" |
| 1979 | The Rebels | Alice | Television film |
| 1979 | Shirley | Aline | Episode: "Hard Hat" |
| 1979 | Barnaby Jones | Kim Gibson | Episode: "Homecoming for a Dead Man" |
| 1979, 1980 | The Incredible Hulk | Vicki Lang / Diane Markon | 2 episodes |
| 1980 | The $5.20 an Hour Dream | Mavis | Television film |
| 1980 | Quincy, M.E. | Brenda Carmichael | Episode: "The Winning Edge" |
| 1980 | The Asphalt Cowboy | Annie Van Heuran | Television film |
| 1981 | The Misadventures of Sheriff Lobo | Jamie | Episode: "What're Girls Like You Doing in a Bank Like This?" |
| 1981 | Here's Boomer | Vicki Nolan | Episode: "The Prince and the Boomer" |
| 1981 | Bosom Buddies | Dana | Episode: "Other Than That, She's a Wonderful Person" |
| 1981 | Lou Grant | Noelle Kilmer | Episode: "Friends" |
| 1982 | Falcon Crest | Diana Michaels | Episode: "Dark Journey" |
| 1982 | Simon & Simon | Julie Arthur | Episode: "Art for Arthur's Sake" |
| 1982 | Voyagers! | Abiah Folger | Episode: "Agents of Satan" |
| 1982–1983 | Newhart | Leslie Vanderkellen | 22 episodes |
| 1983 | Thursday's Child | Television film | Television film |
| 1983 | The Dukes of Hazzard | Mandy Jo | Episode: "Boy's Best Friend" |
| 1983 | Fame | Lisa Connors | Episode: "Rules" |
| 1983 | Hobson's Choice | Alice Hobson | Television film |
| 1984 | Hart to Hart | Pamela Braddon | Episode: "Larsen's Last Jump" |
| 1984 | Samson and Delilah | Varina | Television film |
| 1984 | Hawaiian Heat | Jackie | Episode: "Wave of Controversy" |
| 1984 | Knight Rider | Mandy Moran | Episode: "K.I.T.T. vs. K.A.R.R." |
| 1984, 1985 | The Fall Guy | Erica Robinson / Tracy Seavers | 2 episodes |
| 1984, 1986 | The Love Boat | Linda Sharkey / Gaylan | 2 episodes |
| 1985 | Webster | Maggie Parker | Episode: "Runaway" |
| 1985 | Tales of the Unexpected | Marcie | Episode: "Nothin' Short of Highway Robbery" |
| 1985–1986 | Misfits of Science | Jane Miller | 15 episodes |
| 1987 | L.A. Law | Dr. Jocelyn Pennebaker | Episode: "Fifty Ways to Floss Your Lover" |
| 1987 | Murder, She Wrote | Sandra Clemons / Reagan Miller | 2 episodes |
| 1988 | Who's the Boss? | Judy | Episode: "A Jack Story" |
| 1989 | Matlock | Marie Willis | Episode: "The Psychic" |
| 1993 | Baywatch | Betty | Episode: "Stakeout at Surfrider Beach" |
