= Tony Papenfuss =

American television and film actor (born 1950)

- Born: March 26, 1950 (age 76); Minneapolis, Minnesota, U.S.
- Occupations: Film, television actor
- Years active: 1981–2019

Tony Papenfuss (born March 26, 1950, in Robbinsdale, Minnesota) is an American television and film actor.

Papenfuss is best known for his role as one of the brothers Darryl on Newhart. He was "my brother Darryl", the one with the straighter, darker hair. He reprised this role as a guest-star on an episode of Coach. Before his appearance on Newhart, he also had minor roles in Escape from New York and Firefox.

After Newhart, Papenfuss guest starred on many television shows, including Seinfeld, Star Trek: Deep Space Nine, Murphy Brown, Roswell, and Providence, as well as appearing alongside Bert Convy and Marcia Wallace on the TV game show Super Password in July 1987. He also appeared in several films, including How to Kill a Mockingbird, Factotum, and Sweet Land.

His most recent projects include The Completely Remarkable, Utterly Fabulous Transformation of a Regular Joe and Holiday Beach.

Of his role in Newhart, John Voldstad, who played the other brother who never talked, said he and Papenfuss came up with imaginary scripts that represented what the brothers were thinking. The casting director "knew we could look like we weren't just standing there. We could look like we had something going on in our minds."

After Newhart, Papenfuss toured with his co-stars William Sanderson and Voldstad. Voldstad also continues to act and appear at conventions; he and Papenfuss attended Altoona Day in May 2014. Voldstad said, "I talk to him pretty regularly. Me and Tony are like brothers."

== Filmography ==
Year	Title	Role	Notes
1981	Escape from New York	Theater Assistant	
1982	Firefox	GRU Officer #1	
2002	How to Kill a Mockingbird	Hitler	
2005	Factotum	John Handler	
2005	Sweet Land	Gentleman Bidder	
2007	Arnolds Park	Mr. Campbell	
2008	Older Than America	Dr. Herlihy	
2008	The Completely Remarkable, Utterly Fabulous Transformation of a Regular Joe	Donna Juana	
2009	Into Temptation	Zeke	
2011	Thin Ice	Buckhorn Bartender	
2011	Holiday Beach	Chief	
2014	The Jingle Dress	Marvin	
2016	I Am Not a Serial Killer	Ron the Coroner	
