= Into Temptation (film) =

2009 indie film by Patrick Coyle

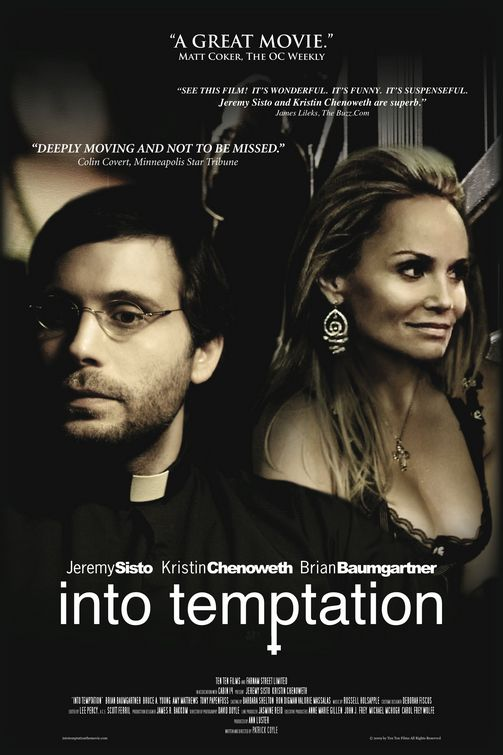
- DVD release cover
- Directed by: Patrick Coyle
- Written by: Patrick Coyle
- Starring: Jeremy Sisto; Kristin Chenoweth; Brian Baumgartner; Bruce A. Young; Amy Matthews
- Cinematography: David Doyle
- Edited by: Lee Percy; Scott Ferril
- Music by: Russell Holsapple
- Production companies: Ten Ten Films; Cabin 14 Productions; Farnam Street II
- Distributed by: First Look International
- Release date: April 26, 2009
- Running time: 95 minutes
- Country: United States
- Language: English
- Budget: <$1 million
- Box office: $97,457

Into Temptation is a 2009 drama film written and directed by Patrick Coyle, and starring Jeremy Sisto, Kristin Chenoweth, Brian Baumgartner, Bruce A. Young and Amy Matthews. It tells the story of a sex worker (Chenoweth) who confesses to a Catholic priest (Sisto) that she plans to kill herself on her birthday. The priest attempts to find and save her, and in doing so he plunges himself into a darker side of society.

The independent film was partially inspired by Coyle's father, a kind but belligerent man who had considered becoming a priest in his early life. The script won the McKnight Screenwriting Fellowship from the IFP Minnesota Center for Media Arts. Into Temptation was filmed and set in Coyle's hometown of Minneapolis, Minnesota. Several supporting roles were filled with actors from the Minneapolis–Saint Paul theater, and Coyle himself performed in a supporting role.

It was produced by Ten Ten Films and Farnam Street II, and distributed by First Look International. With a budget of less than $1 million, filming began in May 2008, and production concluded that December. Cinematography was provided by David Doyle, Russell Holsapple composed the score, and Lee Percy worked as editor. The film touches on themes of temptation, sin, good and evil, redemption and celibacy, as well as the boundaries between a priest providing counsel and getting personally involved with helping parishioners.

Into Temptation was optioned by Hollywood, but talks fell through due to complications from the Great Recession. The film did not receive a national release but played at theaters in several cities. Although first publicly shown for Coyle's father in December 2008, Into Temptation officially premiered on April 26, 2009, at the Newport Beach Film Festival, where Sisto won the "Outstanding Achievement in Acting" award. The film received generally positive reviews. It was released on DVD on October 27, 2009.

== Plot ==
Father John Buerlein (Jeremy Sisto) is the mild-mannered priest of a small Catholic parish in Minneapolis, Minnesota. Overworked and underpaid, he has grown jaded with the profession and has trouble connecting with his parishioners. During confession, a mysterious and unnamed prostitute (Kristin Chenoweth) confesses to a sin she has not yet committed: she plans to commit suicide on her birthday. Father John is taken aback. The confession ends abruptly, and he is unable to stop the woman before she disappears. He knows only that she wears a crucifix and is an Aries (her birthday is soon). Father John grows obsessed with finding and helping this woman, and begins visiting the city's red-light district with the hopes of finding her. On his way home, Father John meets a homeless man named Gus (Gene Larche), but with no money for him, he gives him a rosary instead. Later, he seeks counsel from his friend Father Ralph O'Brien (Brian Baumgartner), who advises him not to become too personally involved.

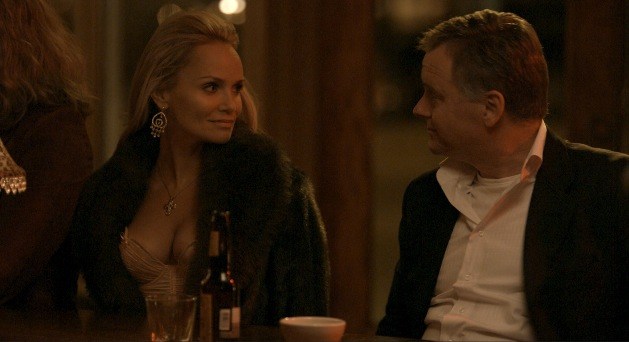
Kristin Chenoweth and director Patrick Coyle, who had a brief supporting role in the film

Father John returns to the red-light district and speaks to a prostitute named Miriam (Greta Oglesby), who suggests a powerful pimp named James St. Clair (Ansa Akyea) might know about the woman. As they speak in a bar, the mysterious prostitute enters and solicits a john (Patrick Coyle), who leaves with her immediately. As she goes, Father John catches a glimpse of the crucifix she is wearing and tries to chase her down. She leaves in the john's car before he can catch them, but he writes down the license plate as they drive off. Back at church, his sermons start to grow more unorthodox, and Father Ralph warns him that his unusual church manner and trips to the red-light district have the archbishop concerned. Meanwhile, Father John is contacted by his ex-girlfriend Nadine Brennan (Amy Matthews), who tells him she is divorcing her husband and still harbors romantic feelings for Father John.

Father John learns the john's car belongs to an accountant named Steven Miller, who tells Father John the prostitute is Linda, an expensive call girl who is widely considered among the best at her profession. Meanwhile, Linda visits her dying, elderly stepfather Donald Dupree (Tom Carey), who repeatedly raped Linda in her childhood and ultimately set her on the path to prostitution. Linda confronts him about their past, but claims she has forgiven him his sins, even though he continues to deny any wrongdoing. A drunk Nadine goes to talk to Father John in confession about her loneliness and feelings for him. He admits to caring for her as well, but they agree to remain friends. Later, Father John hires Lloyd Montag (Bruce A. Young), an unemployed boxer at his church, to serve as his bodyguard as he talks to St. Clair. The pimp, who knows Lloyd from his boxing days, tells Father John what neighborhood Linda lives in. There, Father John and Lloyd find Zeke (Tony Papenfuss), a taxi driver who knows they are looking for Linda and agrees to take them to her apartment. Zeke explains he had driven her to the church when she first spoke to Father John at confession, and Zeke later visited the church to watch Father John preach.

At the apartment, Father John and Lloyd find Linda has moved out, but they discover she had possessed a 12-year-old newspaper clipping about Father John's ordination. Father John offers Lloyd a job helping out at the church, which Lloyd accepts. Father John then returns to his church and cries, fearing he is too late to save Linda. Meanwhile, Linda goes to a bridge and is about to jump off when she encounters Gus, who offers her the rosary he received earlier from Father John. A grateful and emotional Linda hugs Gus. It is not revealed whether she commits suicide or not. In a confession to Father Ralph, Father John expresses guilt he did not absolve Linda before her confession abruptly ended. Father Ralph says that even if Linda is dead, her soul is immortal, and that Father John's penance is to absolve her now. Father John does so. The film ends with a childhood memory of young Linda at church, where a group of boys laugh at her old torn clothes until she is defended by a young John Buerlein, whose act seems to make a strong positive impact upon her.

== Production ==
=== Writing ===
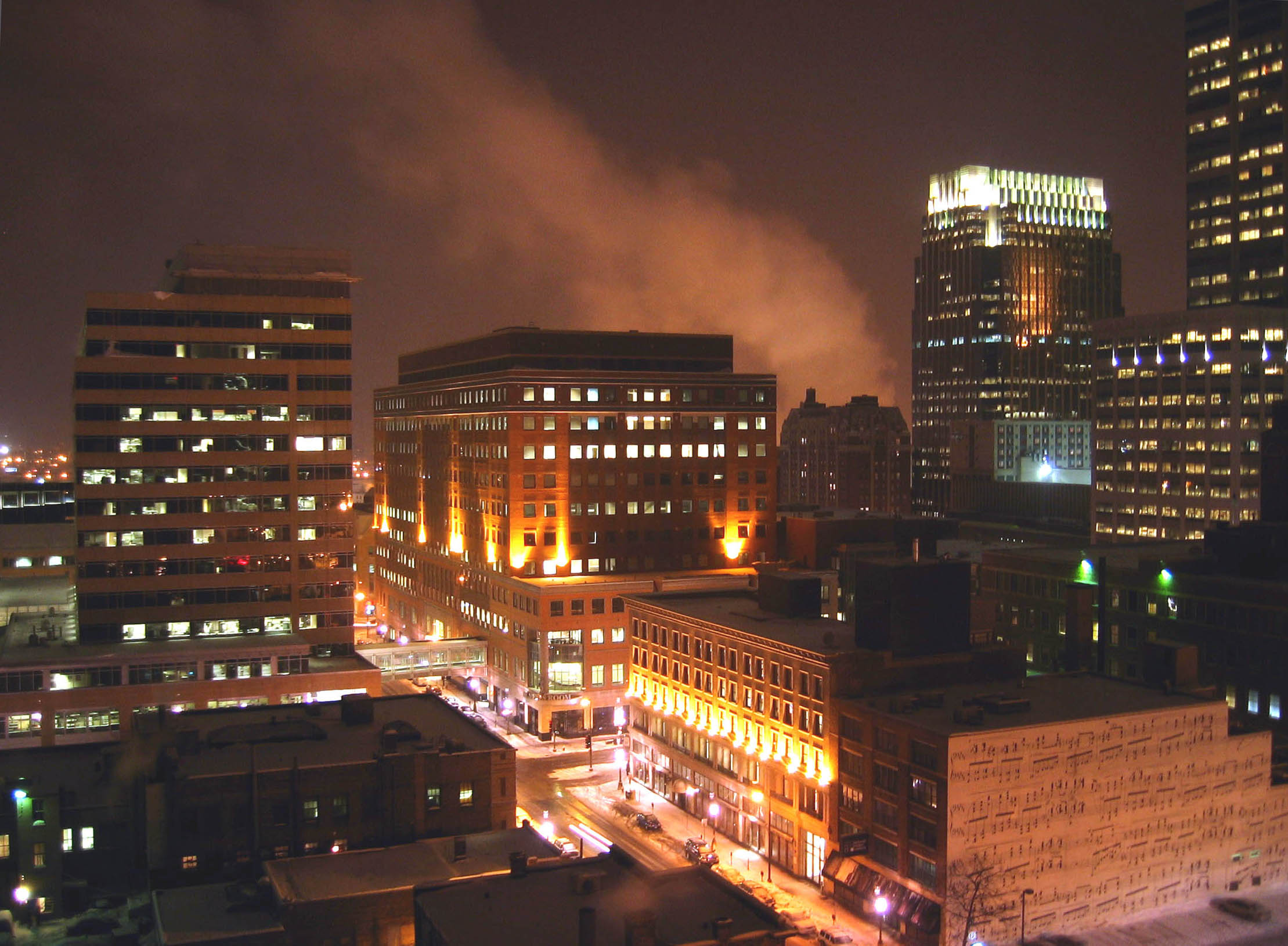
Into Temptation was filmed and set in Minneapolis, Minnesota.

Into Temptation marks the second film by independent filmmaker Patrick Coyle, who wrote and directed the 2003 drama film Detective Fiction. Coyle said Into Temptation was partially inspired by his father, James Patrick Coyle, a kind but belligerent man who had been encouraged by his mother to become a priest. James entered seminary but dropped out before ordination after he was drafted into serving overseas in World War II and met Margaret Mary Quinlan, who would become his wife and Patrick Coyle's mother. Coyle conceived of the script for Into Temptation while imagining what kind of priest his father would have been. His father strongly approved of the project, and told Coyle, "Go make that movie. And tell the truth." Coyle was also partially inspired by his childhood pastor and friend, the Reverend Damian Zuerlein, who performed the marriage ceremony for Coyle and his wife and baptized their children. Coyle said of him, "He's just a young, energetic, competent, committed, devoted man working with a poor parish. And he loves his work. I was inspired by that." Coyle said when writing Into Temptation, he did not intend to make a religious film, and said of protagonist Father John Buerlein, "The character could have been a minister or a rabbi or a public defender. He's a good man trying to do a job the best he can."

Ann Luster, the film's producer, helped with the script from the earliest stages, and claimed she and Coyle had a deep understanding of how to handle the characters from the start. The film was set in Minneapolis, Minnesota, where Coyle lived and worked as a writer and actor at the time. The fictional church in the story, St. Mary Magdalen's Downtown Catholic Church, is based in part on the St. Mary Magdalene church in Omaha, Nebraska, where Coyle was raised. However, the real-life church was also very different from the fictional church in that it lacked a shelter and drew very large congregations for weekend mass, compared to the half-empty pews in the fictional church. The fictional church is also based in part on Our Lady of Guadalupe, another Catholic church in south Omaha. The Into Temptation script won the McKnight Screenwriting Fellowship from IFP Minnesota Center for Media Arts, and investors were sought through public readings. After reading the script, Patrick Coyle's wife said, "If you get a good Father John, you'll have a good movie."

=== Casting ===
Jeremy Sisto said he was drawn to the script and was excited to take on a different project than his regular role of Detective Cyrus Lupo on the NBC crime drama series Law & Order. Sisto said of working on the show, "For nine months we basically do the same episode over and over. This [Into Tempation script] came out of nowhere." Sisto said of working on Into Temptation: "Having just come off a job where there is little room to find true moments and to create a full character, I felt this respite from the task of trying to force a space where I could express something more personal through my job was no less than a creative life saver."

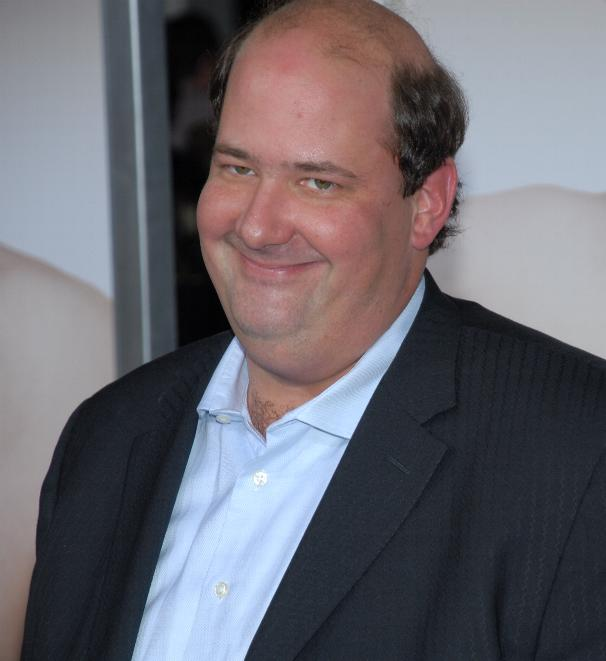
Brian Baumgartner portrayed Father Ralph O'Brien in the film.

Coyle cold called Kristin Chenoweth's agent and proposed the part, which is different from her usual roles, and her agent said it was the exact part the actress was seeking. In order to film Into Temptation, Chenoweth took a five-day hiatus from her supporting role on the ABC television series Pushing Daisies. Brian Baumgartner was previously a regular theater performer in the Minneapolis – Saint Paul area before joining that show. While visiting New York City in May 2008 for an upfront presentation, shortly after having finished filming the fourth season of The Office, Baumgartner was offered the Into Temptation script by Coyle, who asked him to consider taking the role of Father Ralph O'Brien. Baumgartner said he enjoyed the script and agreed to the part.

Writer and director Patrick Coyle plays Steven Miller, one of Linda's clients. Many of the other minor roles were filled by local Minneapolis actors and community members. Greta Oglesby, who played the street-smart prostitute Miriam, and Isabell Monk O'Connor, who played a librarian who helps Father John, were both veterans of the Minneapolis – Saint Paul theater circuit. Ansa Akyea, who played pimp James St. Clair, and Amy Matthews, who played Father John's ex-girlfriend, were also from the Minneapolis – Saint Paul area.

=== Filming ===
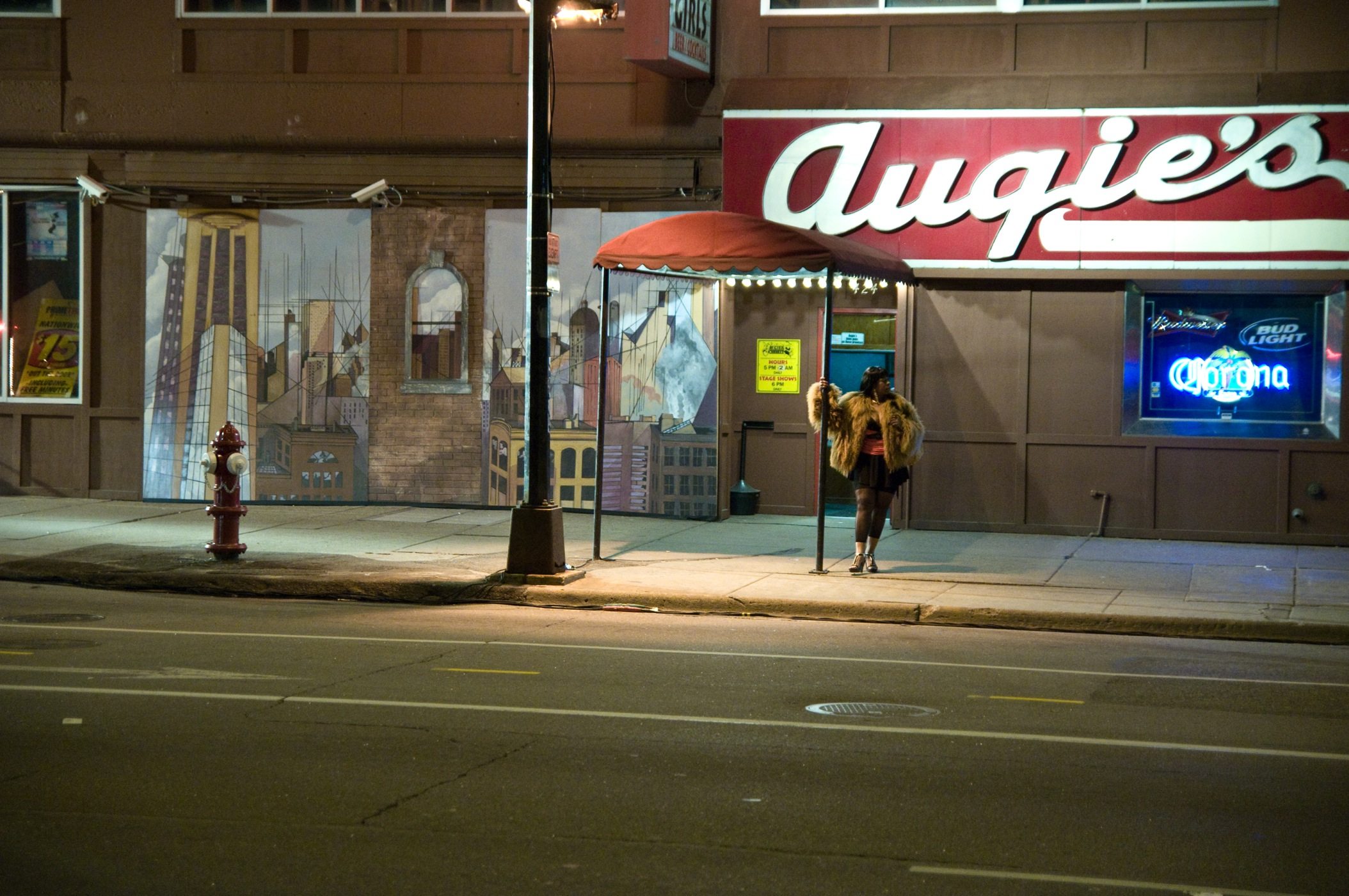
Actress Greta Oglesby appears on a set depicting the city's red-light district.

Into Temptation was produced by Coyle's production company, Ten Ten Films, and the company Farnam Street II, in association with Cabin 14 Productions. It was distributed by First Look International. About a year before the film was released, Coyle asked Anne Marie Gillen to serve as executive producer. Gillen said she had not responded to a script in such an emotional way since the 1991 drama film Fried Green Tomatoes, which she also produced. Filming, which began in May 2008, took place entirely in Minneapolis. It included several scenes staged in the city's Uptown commercial district, where Coyle lived.

In addition to his personal connections to the city, Coyle said filming took place in Minneapolis because it was relatively inexpensive to shoot there and hire local actors. He said, "Shooting in Uptown is a filmmaker's paradise. You've got everything here." Into Tempation was produced and shot on a very low budget of less than $1 million. Cinematography was provided by David Doyle, who made extensive use of the Red Digital Cinema Camera. The church scenes were filmed at the Incarnation Church in the city. Sisto and Chenoweth both attended mass services at the church as part of their research for the roles. Exterior car scenes were shot in the Uptown district. During one scene in particular, a police car with a siren passed by the actors during a shot. The actors continued uninterrupted, and the final shot was used in the film.

Coyle approached Russell Holsapple, a Minneapolis – Saint Paul native and relatively inexperienced composer, to create the score for Into Temptation. Holsapple was given only a few weeks to create the score, which was composed mostly of piano music. Holsapple said Coyle gave him a great deal of artistic freedom and was largely receptive to the themes he wrote. James R. Bakkom worked as production designer on the film, and Deborah Fiscus served as costume designer. Both are natives of the Minneapolis – Saint Paul area. Vanessa Miles was set decorator, while Sarah Jean Kruchowski and Amy Hubbard both worked as art directors.

Lee Percy served as editor of the film. He said the final cuts provided to him already contained the actors' strongest performances, but he placed a greater focus on Father John's character in an effort to "help the audience get inside him and connect emotionally". Percy was assisted by editor Scott Ferril. Patrick Coyle's father, Jim, followed production of the film closely, making weekly calls to inquire about it. When his father's health started to decline, Patrick Coyle "worked like hell" to finish the film quickly so his father could see it before he died. The film was finished in December 2008.

== Release ==
=== Distribution ===
Into Temptation was optioned by Hollywood, but Coyle was displeased when industry officials wanted him to change the ending and make the sex scenes more risque. Due to the financial effects of the Great Recession, the Hollywood discussions eventually collapsed. It did not receive a national release, but played at theaters in New York City, Los Angeles, Fargo, North Dakota, and several cities throughout Minnesota, including Minneapolis and Duluth. Coyle first publicly showed the film on December 26, 2008, at the Omaha hospice where his father Jim was staying for an audience of about 15 people. Jim Coyle, who died a few weeks after the screening, loved the film, describing it as very powerful and truthful. It officially premiered on April 26, 2009, at the Newport Beach Film Festival in Newport Beach, California.

During its opening weekend at the Lagoon Cinema in Minneapolis, Into Temptation sold more tickets in three days than any other film during its debut weekend, and sold twice the tickets of such major studio films as Taking Woodstock and Quentin Tarantino's Inglourious Basterds. This resulted in an extended run and strong word-of-mouth that led to exhibitions in other cities. The film earned a total of $97,457 in gross revenue in the United States. The Into Temptation DVD was released on October 27, 2009, with no bonus features.

=== Critical response ===
Into Temptation received generally positive reviews. On the review aggregator website Rotten Tomatoes, 80% of 5 critics' reviews are positive, with an average rating of 7.1/10. Variety magazine writer Rob Nelson called it a well-photographed film of "occasionally irreverent wit", and that Coyle "strikes a near-perfect balance between humor and holiness". Nelson said the film "falters only in its hokey characterization" of the Chenoweth character. Colin Covert of the Star Tribune called it a "haunting, carefully crafted movie" with simple "matter-of-fact" direction, a "trim and efficient" screenplay, strong acting and solid characters. Covert said, "This is one of very few American films to deal with religious beliefs about faith and salvation with empathy and insight." OC Weekly writer Matt Coker said Into Temptation had a cohesive script which "strikes just the right chord of reverence for the Catholic faith". He also praised the moments of comic relief with Sisto and Baumgartner, which he said complimented some of the film's heavier moments. L. Kent Wolgamott of the Lincoln Journal Star called Into Temptation a well-made film that "gets the mood right from start to finish". He complimented the performances and said although pornography and prostitution were familiar film topics, "the film's nuanced understanding of the priest and his conflicted role in trying to save Linda adds a new element to the old story."

Bob Fischbach of the Omaha World-Herald called the cinematography sharp, the editing crisp, and the acting "uniformly good". He added, "Best of all, the writing is anchored in reality. Coyle lets his film show rather than tell, and lets viewers reach their own conclusions." Lavender magazine writer John Townsend said the film conveyed compassionate views of Christianity and complimented the cinematography. Townsend particularly praised Baumgartner's performance and described the scenes between Sisto and a young boy troubled by his homosexual feelings (John Skelley) as "exquisite". Chelsa Doyle, a writer with the website Blogcritics, called it "a touching and introspective film about faith, hope and choice". Doyle praised the film's quiet tone and the performances of Sisto and Chenoweth, but said it "occasionally gets a little sleepy in the middle", and that the subplot involving Father John's ex-girlfriend could have been cut altogether. Denver Post film critic Lisa Kennedy praised the performances of Sisto and Chenoweth, and complimented Coyle's understanding of the pastoral work of a parish priest. However, she added that the film "doesn't break ground as a story, even one about redemption". Andrea Gronvall of the Chicago Reader called it a "cheesy melodrama", and wrote, "Writer-director Patrick Coyle tackles such weighty issues as child abuse, alcoholism, hypocrisy, celibacy, and Catholic reforms, but the movie's spiritual agenda is belied by its voyeurism."

Jeremy Sisto was awarded "Outstanding Achievement in Acting" from the 2009 Newport Beach Film Festival awards.

== Themes ==
Throughout the film, Father John is warned that his role as a priest comes with boundaries, and that he should not become personally involved with the congregants or try to solve their problems except through counseling. However, Father John begins to question those boundaries and reconsider whether the role as priest goes far enough in having a positive, substantive impact on the lives of those in his care, particularly Linda. And, in addition to questioning whether he is helping his congregants, Father John questions whether staying within those boundaries is enough to personally fulfill himself as a priest and provide his own life with meaning. He ultimately crosses over those boundaries and gets personally involved in trying to help Linda by delving into the city's red-light district to seek her.

There's an Irish notion of thin places, where earth and heaven are very close. It is not strange to find the sacred and the profane intertwined. It's that way in the movie, too.

— Rev. Damian Zuerlein
Papillion priest, friend
of director Patrick Coyle

The film takes a modern, liberal approach to the rules and constraints of Catholicism. Even before Father John decides to help Linda, he is questioning the constraints of his religion and calling. While speaking to a prospective mother struggling over whether to raise her daughter within the strict confines of Catholicism, Father John gives her advice beyond the official dogma and encourages her to be flexible, telling her she should "take what works" from the church teachings. Father John also has an unorthodox view of homosexuality compared to the normal views of the church. This is demonstrated in a scene in which the priest comforts a young man who is struggling with his homosexual feelings. In meeting and interacting with the pimps and prostitutes of the red-light district, Into Temptation blurs the lines between good and evil, and between right and wrong. The negative responses Father John encounters from congregants and the church regarding his trips to the red-light district demonstrate the way sex and poverty are often stigmatized in society.

As the title suggests, one of the major themes of the film involves the temptations Father John faces to sin and stray from his priestly calling. This is perhaps most strongly manifested in his apparent ambivalence regarding the vow of celibacy required of Catholic priests. As Father John goes deeper into the red-light district and the seedier aspects of Minneapolis, he appears to face temptations from the prostitution and overt sexuality surrounding him. Additionally, it can be interpreted that his interest in Linda is one of physical attraction, as well as a desire to help her. This is further manifested through the sudden reappearance of his former girlfriend, for whom Father John admits to still harboring romantic feelings. The priest demonstrates conflicting emotions when it comes to maintaining his priestly vows and his relationship with Nadine.

Into Temptation is also a story of redemption, both for Linda, who is seeking redemption for a life of sin and prostitution, and for Father John, who is seeking redemption for his failure to help Linda and his own doubts about religion and priesthood. At the start of the film, Father John appears to be questioning his duty to the church and its dwindling congregation; this is especially demonstrated when he appears bored during confession and does crossword puzzles to pass the time. Such struggles are not uncommon in priesthood. But after he resists the church boundaries and attempts to help Linda, his faith in the congregation and belief in the profession are restored, and he returns to the church a stronger and more content priest. The film demonstrates the power of compassion and individual kindness, particularly in the way that John's simple act of defending Linda during her childhood was such a profound moment in her life. The film also advocates repentance, and the extent of Linda's victimization can be interpreted as a sign of how catastrophic an unrepentant life can be.
