= Newhart =

American television sitcom (1982–1990)

- Created by: Barry Kemp
- Developed by: Sheldon Bull
- Starring: Bob Newhart; Mary Frann; Jennifer Holmes; Julia Duffy; Tom Poston; Steven Kampmann; Peter Scolari; William Sanderson; Tony Papenfuss; John Voldstad
- Theme music composer: Henry Mancini
- Composer: Nelson Riddle
- Country of origin: United States
- Original language: English
- No. of seasons: 8
- No. of episodes: 184 (list of episodes)

Production
- Executive producers: Barry Kemp; Mark Egan; Mark Solomon; Dan Wilcox; Douglas Wyman; David Mirkin
- Producer: Sheldon Bull
- Running time: 24 minutes
- Production companies: MTM Enterprises; 20th Television

Original release
- Network: CBS
- Release: October 25, 1982 – May 21, 1990

Related
- The Bob Newhart Show

Newhart is an American television sitcom that aired on CBS from October 25, 1982, to May 21, 1990, with a total of 184 half-hour episodes spanning eight seasons. The series stars Bob Newhart and Mary Frann as an author and his wife, respectively, who own and operate the Stratford Inn in rural Vermont. The small town is home to many eccentric characters. TV Guide, TV Land, and A&E named the Newhart series finale as one of the most memorable in television history. The theme music for Newhart was composed by Henry Mancini.

== Premise ==
Bob Newhart plays Dick Loudon, an author of do-it-yourself and travel books. He and his wife Joanna move from New York City to a small town in rural Vermont (Note: The town's name is never mentioned in the show, but context clues placing the town 59 miles from Montpelier and within commuting distance of Dartmouth College lead many media sources to identify it as Norwich. Exterior shots were filmed at the Waybury Inn in East Middlebury.) to operate the 200-year-old Stratford Inn.

Dick and Joanna initially run the inn with the help of sweet-natured but simple handyman George Utley and Leslie Vanderkellen, a bright, cheerful Dartmouth College student and heiress who takes a job as a maid to find out what it is like to be "normal". Next door to the inn is the Minuteman Café, owned by Kirk Devane, a petty opportunist and compulsive liar. Leslie leaves before season two to continue her studies abroad, to be replaced by her cousin Stephanie, who, unlike Leslie, is vain, lazy, and spoiled. Awkward, uncultured backwoodsman brothers Larry, Darryl and Darryl are seen with increasing frequency as work-for-hire odd-job men in the first two seasons, and take over the Minuteman Cafe when Kirk leaves at the start of season 3.

Near the end of season two, Dick becomes the host of a local television show, Vermont Today, where he interviews an assortment of bizarre and colorful guests. His vapid, neurotic producer, Michael Harris, falls in love with Stephanie, their relationship providing a satire of 1980s excess.

The final episode of the series reveals that the entire series was a dream of Dr. Robert Hartley, Newhart's character in The Bob Newhart Show.

== Cast ==
=== Main ===
- Bob Newhart as Dick Loudon
- Mary Frann as Joanna Loudon
- Tom Poston as George Utley
- Steven Kampmann as Kirk Devane (seasons 1–2)
- Jennifer Holmes as Leslie Vanderkellen (season 1)
- Julia Duffy as Stephanie Vanderkellen (guest season 1, main seasons 2–8)
- Peter Scolari as Michael Harris (recurring season 2, main seasons 3–8)
- William Sanderson, Tony Papenfuss, and John Voldstad as Larry, Darryl and Darryl (recurring season 1-2, main seasons 3-8)

=== Recurring ===
- William Lanteau as Chester Wanamaker (1982–90)
- Thomas Hill as Jim Dixon (1982–90)
- Rebecca York as Cindy Parker-Devane (1983–84)
- Jeff Doucette as Harley Estin (1983–88)
- Fred Applegate as J. J. Wall (1984–87)
- Ralph Manza as Bud (1984–90)
- Linda Carlson as Bev Dutton (1984–87)
- Todd Susman as Officer Shifflett (1984–90)
- José Ferrer as Arthur Vanderkellen (1985–87)
- Priscilla Morrill as Marian Vanderkellen (1985–89)
- Melanie Chartoff as Dr. Mary Kaiser (1987–90)
- Kathy Kinney as Prudence Goddard (1989–90)
- David Pressman as Mr. Art Rusnak (1989–90)

== Reception ==
Newhart was a solid ratings winner, finishing its first six seasons in the Nielsen top 25. Despite not finishing in the top 30 for its last two seasons, Bob Newhart stated in an interview with the Archive of American Television that CBS was satisfied enough with the show's ratings to renew it for a ninth season in 1990. However, Newhart, who was anxious to move on to other projects, declined the offer, promising CBS that he would develop a new series for the network, which he was under contract to do. This resulted in the 1992 series Bob, which lasted two seasons.

Newhart season rankings in the U.S. television market
| Season | Episodes | Original air dates | | TV season | Nielsen ratings | | |
| Season | Episodes | Season premiere | Season finale | TV season | Rank | Rating | Households (Note: 1982–1987) / Viewers (Note: 1989–1990) (in millions) |
|---|---|---|---|---|---|---|---|
| 1 | 22 | October 25, 1982 | April 10, 1983 | 1982–1983 | #12 | 20.0 | 16.66 |
| 2 | 22 | October 17, 1983 | April 16, 1984 | 1983–1984 | #23 | 18.0 | 15.08 |
| 3 | 22 | October 15, 1984 | May 28, 1985 | 1984–1985 | #16 | 18.4 | —N/a |
| 4 | 24 | September 30, 1985 | May 12, 1986 | 1985–1986 | #16 | 19.6 | 16.84 |
| 5 | 24 | September 29, 1986 | April 13, 1987 | 1986–1987 | #12 | 19.5 | 17.04 |
| 6 | 24 | September 14, 1987 | April 9, 1988 | 1987–1988 | #25 | 16.5 | —N/a |
| 7 | 22 | October 24, 1988 | May 22, 1989 | 1988–1989 | #50 | 12.8 | —N/a |
| 8 | 24 | September 18, 1989 | May 21, 1990 | 1989–1990 | #48 | 13.1 | 19.34 |

== Awards ==
=== Nominations ===
==== Emmy Awards ====
The show was nominated for 25 Emmy Awards but never won.

1983

- Outstanding Comedy Series – Sheldon Bull, Producer; Barry Kemp, Executive Producer
- Outstanding Video Tape Editing For a Series – Andy Ackerman

1984

- Outstanding Comedy Series – Sheldon Bull, Producer; Barry Kemp, Executive Producer
- Outstanding Supporting Actor in a Comedy Series – Tom Poston
- Outstanding Supporting Actress in a Comedy Series – Julia Duffy

1985

- Outstanding Lead Actor in a Comedy Series – Bob Newhart
- Outstanding Supporting Actress in a Comedy Series – Julia Duffy

1986

- Outstanding Lead Actor in a Comedy Series – Bob Newhart
- Outstanding Sound Mixing For a Comedy or Drama – Andrew MacDonald, Sound Mixer; Bill Nicholson, Sound Mixer; Craig Porter, Sound Mixer; Richard Wachter, Sound Mixer
- Outstanding Supporting Actor in a Comedy Series – Tom Poston
- Outstanding Supporting Actress in a Comedy Series – Julia Duffy

1987

- Outstanding Lead Actor in a Comedy Series – Bob Newhart
- Outstanding Supporting Actor in a Comedy Series:
  - Tom Poston
  - Peter Scolari
- Outstanding Supporting Actress in a Comedy Series – Julia Duffy
- Outstanding Writing For a Comedy Series – David Mirkin ("Co-Hostess Twinkie")

1988

- Outstanding Editing For a Series (Multi-Camera Production) – Michael Wilcox, Editor
- Outstanding Supporting Actor in a Comedy Series – Peter Scolari
- Outstanding Supporting Actress in a Comedy Series – Julia Duffy

1989

- Outstanding Guest Actress in a Comedy Series – Eileen Brennan
- Outstanding Supporting Actor in a Comedy Series – Peter Scolari
- Outstanding Supporting Actress in a Comedy Series – Julia Duffy

1990

- Outstanding Editing For a Series (Multi-Camera Production) – Michael Wilcox, Editor
- Outstanding Supporting Actress in a Comedy Series – Julia Duffy
- Outstanding Writing For a Comedy Series – Bob Bendetson, Mark Egan and Mark Solomon ("The Last Newhart")

==== Golden Globe Awards ====
Newhart earned six nominations for Golden Globe Awards.

- Television Series – Musical or Comedy (1984)
- Actor in a Television Series – Musical or Comedy: Bob Newhart (1983–1986)
- Actress in a Supporting Role in a Series, Mini-Series or Motion Picture Made for Television: Julia Duffy (1988)

==== Other awards ====
Newhart was nominated for one Casting Society of America award and four nominations for TV Land Awards. Newhart won a total of four Viewers for Quality Television Awards.

== Home media ==
20th Century Fox released season one of Newhart on DVD in Region 1 on February 26, 2008.

In November 2013, Shout! Factory announced it had acquired the rights to the series. It has since released the remainder of the series in individual season sets.

| DVD name | Ep. No. | Release date |
|---|---|---|
| The Complete First Season | 22 | February 26, 2008 |
| The Complete Second Season | 22 | February 11, 2014 |
| The Complete Third Season | 22 | April 22, 2014 |
| The Complete Fourth Season | 24 | August 19, 2014 |
| The Complete Fifth Season | 24 | May 10, 2016 |
| The Complete Sixth Season | 24 | September 13, 2016 |
| The Complete Seventh Season | 22 | December 13, 2016 |
| The Complete Eighth Season | 24 | March 14, 2017 |
