= Hallypop =

American television Korean entertainment channel

- Country: United States
- Broadcast area: United States

Programming
- Languages: English; Korean (programs)
- Picture format: 1080p (HDTV)

Ownership
- Owner: Jungo TV
- Sister channels: Combat Go; Front Row Channel; Kick Flix; ES24

History
- Launched: 2018; 8 years ago

Links
- Website: hallypop.com

Availability

Streaming media
- Affiliated streaming/FAST services: Stirr, Roku, Samsung TV Plus

Hallypop is a digital entertainment channel owned by Jungo TV in partnership with Cinedigm, based in the United States. The channel airs programming content from Seoul Broadcasting System (SBS) which focuses on Korean variety shows, music, dramas and live concerts.

== Programming ==
The channel primarily airs content outsourced from SBS, including reality (Running Man), music variety (Music Bank, K-pop Star, and JYP’s Party People), drama and lifestyle.

== International versions ==
In 2019, GMA Network had signed a partnership deal with Jungo TV to launch a Philippine version of the channel, which was launched on September 20, 2020 until its closure on September 20, 2024 exactly after four years due to contract expiration. Hallypop was available on GMA Affordabox digital set-top-box, along with GMA, GTV, Heart of Asia Channel, I Heart Movies and Pinoy Hits.
