= Hallypop (Philippine TV channel) =

Philippine cable television channel

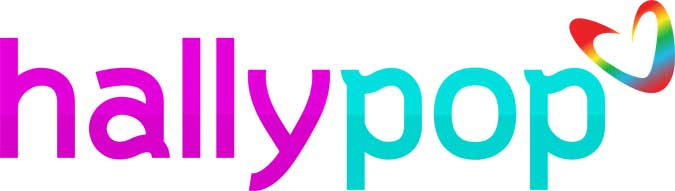
- Sole logo of Hallypop, used from 2020 to 2024.
- Country: Philippines

Programming
- Languages: English; Korean
- Picture format: 1080p HDTV (downscaled to 16:9 480i for the SDTV feed)

Ownership
- Owner: Jungo TV; GMA Network, Inc. (co-partner; 2020–2024); Solar Entertainment Corporation (co-partner/distributor; 2025–present)
- Sister channels: Front Row Channel; Jungo Pinoy TV; Black Belt Channel; AWSN

History
- Launched: September 6, 2020; 6 years ago (test broadcast); September 20, 2020; 6 years ago (official launch); November 2024; 2 years ago (as a digital linear and cable channel)
- Closed: September 20, 2024; 2 years ago (as a digital free-to-air channel)
- Replaced by: I Heart Movies (xx.06 digital channel space)

Availability

Terrestrial
- Sky TV (Philippines): Channel 206

Streaming media
- Jungo Pinoy: jungopinoy.com

Hallypop is a Philippine cable television channel. It was established on September 20, 2020 as the Philippine version of Hallypop, owned by GMA Network, Inc. It serves since 2024 as a digital linear web television channel owned by American company Jungo TV, with Solar Entertainment Corporation handles the channel's distribution rights to local pay television providers.

Previously, it was a digital free-to-air television channel in partnership with GMA Network Inc. The channel was on test broadcast from September 6–19, 2020; and was officially launched on September 20, 2020. It operated daily from 6:00 AM to 12:00 MN and goes off-air during Holy Week (yearly) from Maundy Thursday to Black Saturday. The said channel ceased its operations on September 20, 2024.

In November 2024, about two months after its closure, Jungo TV revived Hallypop as a linear digital channel on its own streaming service Jungo Pinoy.

== Overview ==
Dubbed as the world's first Asian pop culture channel, Hallypop airs contents outsourced from SBS, including reality show (Running Man), music variety (K-pop Star, and JYP’s Party People), KBS' Music Bank, and from Front Row Channel which features live concerts with featured performances from the world's top musical acts.

== History ==
=== Plans ===
In 2019, GMA Network Inc. announced its plans to invest for its second phase transition to digital television, including a partnership with U.S.-based global entertainment company Jungo TV and Philippine telecommunications conglomerate PLDT-Smart to distribute content across all of its channels. As part of their ongoing transition and the launch of their own digital television box, the network launched its first subchannel aside from their two main channels via Heart of Asia Channel in the lineup of DZBB-DTV Channel 15.

=== Launch ===
On the morning of September 6, 2020, GMA Network made some adjustments on its digital television channels by adding new sub-channels on their digital frequency. The said programs were detected as early as 2:00am of September 6, 2020, at their digital frequency in Batangas, and 6:00am in Mega Manila.

Hallypop began its test broadcast on September 6, 2020, airing music programs such as Music Bank, StarGazeMuzik and HallyStage, while it airs promo plug of the upcoming programs with its assigned blocks. The channel was fully launched on September 20, 2020, with reality shows Running Man and Party People on their first broadcast.

From August 1, 2021 to September 9, 2024, Hallypop watch on Cignal TV Channel 152 in Nationwide.

On February 27, 2023, Hallypop, along with other GMA Network-owned channels, switched its broadcast from the original 4:3 format to 16:9 anamorphic widescreen format.

=== Closure on free TV, returned as a linear/pay TV channel ===
On September 9, 2024, GMA Network and Jungo TV announced that Hallypop (alongside its sister channel Pinoy Hits) will cease broadcast on September 20, 2024 after four years of broadcasting due to former's contract expiration with the latter.

It ceased its broadcast at 12:00 MN of September 20, 2024, with Hallypop Lokal as its final program aired on the channel.

In November 2024, a week after its closure, Jungo TV revived Hallypop as a linear digital channel on its own streaming service Jungo Pinoy. Unlike its previous iteration as a digital free-to-air channel in terms of limiting broadcast hours, the current channel is 24 hours. In 2025, Jungo TV has tapped Solar Entertainment Corporation to distribute the channel on pay TV providers.

== See also ==
- K-pop
- Myx
