= John Zabrucky =

American prop designer and co-founder of Modern Props, Inc

- Born: John Zabrucky; 1947 or 1948 (age 78–79); Warren, Ohio, U.S.
- Education: Kent State University
- Occupation: Prop designer
- Years active: 1977–2020
- Website: johnzabrucky.com

John Zabrucky (born 1947/1948) is an American prop designer and co-founder of Modern Props, Inc., a prop design and rental company that produced and distributed props for film and television productions. Through Modern Props, Zabrucky contributed props to such films as Ghostbusters (1984) and RoboCop (1987), as well as films and TV series in the Star Trek franchise. Zabrucky is known for designing a prop apparatus sometimes informally dubbed "the most important device in the universe", due to its appearances in over 100 films and TV series.

== Early life and education ==
Zabrucky was born in Warren, Ohio. His mother was Italian. He attended Turner Junior High School and studied for one year at Youngstown State University. He earned his bachelor's degree at Kent State University (KSU) and began teaching art classes there, as well as at the University of Akron and the Mansfield Reformatory. Zabrucky won awards from the Cleveland Museum of Art and the Art Directors Club of New York in 1972 and 1974, respectively. Dissatisfied with the graphic design program at KSU that was required for his master's degree, he decided to move to Los Angeles, California, with his then-girlfriend, set decorator Linda DeScenna.

== Career ==
=== 1974–1977: Establishing Modern Props, Inc. ===
After their move to Los Angeles, Zabrucky and DeScenna's relationship ended, though they remained friends. Zabrucky reportedly found himself working "horrible" jobs like assembling scuba diving equipment, and collecting food stamps. After witnessing a prop malfunction while waiting for DeScenna on a Warner Bros. lot one day, he told a producer that he could easily build superior props to the one that malfunctioned; this led to a meeting in which the producer introduced Zabrucky to the prop design and rental business. Zabrucky began building props from home for TV series such as Quark and Buck Rogers in the 25th Century. In 1977, with an $18,000 investment from a friend, Zabrucky co-founded Modern Props, Inc. alongside John Mark Robinson and Michael Ladish. That year, the company moved out of Zabrucky's home and into a 4,000 sq ft (370 m^{2}) facility in Inglewood.

=== 1979–2000: Success in film and television ===
The first film that Zabrucky provided props for was Meteor (1979). The following year, he served as art director and casting director for the music video for the Devo song "Whip It". Around that time, Zabrucky shared an apartment in Los Angeles with Devo members Gerald and Bob Casale.

Zabrucky designed the communicators and other props seen in Star Trek II: The Wrath of Khan, as well as the eyeball fabrication machine seen in Blade Runner (both 1982). During the production of the 1984 film Ghostbusters, Zabrucky created a prop device in partnership with an outside fabricator; he presented it to the Ghostbusters propmaster, and the prop became the PKE meter seen in the finished film. Zabrucky also constructed props for Rocky IV (1985); RoboCop (1987), for which he built a mechanical recharging chair; Back to the Future Part II (1989); Batman Returns (1992); Speed (1994); and Independence Day (1996). By the mid-1990s, Zubrucky oversaw a 120,000 sq ft (11,000 m^{2}) facility in Culver City with 58 employees.

By 2003, Modern Props was known for supplying props for science fiction productions, as well as modern furniture for productions featuring everyday homes.

=== 2008–2020: Decline and closure of Modern Props ===
Despite the launching of a satellite office in Vancouver, Modern Props struggled as a result of the Great Recession, during which Zabrucky laid off almost half of his staff and shortened the workweek for the remaining employees. Other challenges included the increased use of computer-generated (CG) effects and sets in films and TV series, as well as the popularity of reality television programming, which utilizes few props.

Around 2014, he accepted an offer to sell the space in Culver City, and relocated to a 600,000 sq ft (56,000 m^{2}) facility in San Fernando. Citing the growth of films and TV series being shot outside of California and utilizing CG effects and sets over physical props, Zabrucky decided to close Modern Props in late 2019. By May 2020, he had auctioned off the majority of the furniture and props rented out by Modern Props.

== "The most important device in the universe" ==
A prop machine designed by Zabrucky and rented out to film and TV productions by Modern Props is sometimes informally called "the most important device in the universe", as a result of its many appearances in science fiction films and TV series. The apparatus in question was built for the TV series The Incredible Hulk (1977–1982), and features two long, glass tubes that glow red, orange, and yellow, as well as a control panel outfitted with buttons and dials. The device has appeared in multiple episodes of Star Trek: The Next Generation (1987–1994) and the film Austin Powers: The Spy Who Shagged Me (1999), as well as over 100 other films and TV series.

== Personal life ==
Zabrucky is married. He and his wife own two homes: one in Pacific Palisades, Los Angeles, and another in Apulia, Italy. As a pastime, Zabrucky creates large-scale, three-dimensional aluminum and steel sculptures, often featuring futuristic and steampunk elements along with anti-war themes.

== Filmography ==
=== Films ===
Year	Title	Prop designer	Set decorator	Ref(s)
1979	Meteor	Yes		
1980	Battle Beyond the Stars		Yes	
1981	Escape from New York	Yes		
1982	Star Trek II: The Wrath of Khan	Yes		
1982	Blade Runner	Yes		
1984	The Ice Pirates	Yes		
1984	Ghostbusters	Yes		
1985	Rocky IV	Yes		
1987	RoboCop	Yes		
1987	The Running Man	Yes		
1989	Ghostbusters II	Yes		
1989	Back to the Future Part II	Yes		
1990	Total Recall	Yes		
1992	Batman Returns	Yes		
1994	Speed	Yes		
1996	Independence Day	Yes		
1997	Starship Troopers	Yes		
2000	X-Men	Yes		
2002	Star Trek: Nemesis	Yes		
2005	XXX: State of the Union	Yes		
2007	Live Free or Die Hard	Yes		
2009	Star Trek	Yes		
2012	Men in Black 3	Yes		
2012	The Amazing Spider-Man	Yes		

=== Television series ===
Year	Title	Prop designer	Ref(s)
1977	The Fantastic Journey	Yes	
1977	Quark	Yes	
1977–1982	The Incredible Hulk	Yes	
1979–1981	Buck Rogers in the 25th Century	Yes	
1995–2005	JAG	Yes	
2001–2005	Star Trek: Enterprise	Yes	
2001–2010	24	Yes	
2002	Firefly	Yes	
2006–2012	Eureka	Yes	
2008–2014	True Blood	Yes	
2009–2016	Castle	Yes	
2013–2015	Mighty Med	Yes	
2014–2020	Henry Danger	Yes	
2014–2022	Black-ish	Yes	

=== Music videos ===
- "Whip It" by Devo (art and casting director)

=== Selected works featuring "the most important device in the universe" ===
- The Incredible Hulk (1977–1982)
- Knight Rider (1982–1986)
- Airplane II: The Sequel (1982)
- The Last Starfighter (1984)
- Star Trek: The Next Generation (1987–1994)
- Austin Powers: The Spy Who Shagged Me (1999)
