= Hidy Ochiai =

Japanese martial artist (born 1939)

- Born: September 27, 1939 (age 86); Japan
- Style: Washin-Ryu karate (founder, 1966)
- Website: www.hidyochiai.org

Hidehiko "Hidy" Ochiai (Japanese: 落合秀彦, born September 27, 1939) is a Japanese-born martial arts instructor, author, and actor. He is credited with establishing the Washin-Ryu style of karate in the United States in 1966. He was the winner of the United States Grand National Karate Championship five consecutive times. Ochiai was inducted into the Black Belt Hall of Fame twice—as Instructor of the Year for Japanese Arts in 1979 and as Man of the Year in 1980. He resides in Vestal, New York.

== Books authored ==
Ochiai is the author of several self-defense books, and has also translated Miyamoto Musashi's The Book of Five Rings. His entire published works are:

- The Essence of Self-Defense
- Hidy Ochiai's Living Karate
- Hidy Ochiai's Self-Defense for Kids: A Guide for Parents and Teachers
- Hidy Ochiai's Complete Book of Self-Defense
- A Way to Victory: The Annotated Book of Five Rings

== Magazine articles ==
The following is a list of magazines that have featured Ochiai.

- Martial Arts Professional, Feb. 2006, vol. 11 no. 2
- Black Belt, Oct. 1991, vol. 29 no. 10
- Karate Illustrated, Jan. 1984, vol. 15 no. 1
- Official Karate Annual, Spring 1982
- Kick Illustrated, Jan. 1982, vol. 3 no. 1
- Black Belt, July 1980, vol. 18 no. 7
- Official Karate, Jan. 1977, vol. 9 no. 67
- Black Belt, Dec. 1976, vol. 14 no. 2
- Karate Illustrated, Feb. 1975, vol. 6 no. 2
- Official Karate, Feb. 1974, vol. 6 no. 33

== Filmography ==
Film
Title	Year	Role	Director	Notes #
Fist of Fury	1972	Japanese fighter	Lo Wei	Uncredited
Enter the Dragon	1973		Robert Clouse	
Dangerous Passages	1987	Sensei	Leo Fong	
Hawkeye	1988	Sakura	George Chung; Leo Fong	(final film role)

Television
Title	Year	Role	Director	Episode #	Notes #
Kung Fu	1972		Jerry Thorpe	"Pilot"	
