= Jay Roberts =

Jay Roberts may refer to:

- Jay Roberts (Canadian football), Canadian football player
- Jay Roberts Jr., American police captain and actor
