= Lockdown (1990 film) =

- Directed by: Frank Harris
- Written by: Joseph Izzo Jr. Joseph Mangelli
- Screenplay by: Joseph Izzo Jr. Joseph Mangelli
- Produced by: Diane Stevenett
- Starring: Richard Lynch; Chris DeRose; Chuck Jeffreys; Elizabeth Kaitan; Joe Estevez
- Cinematography: Frank Harris
- Edited by: Howard Heard
- Music by: Bob Mamet
- Distributed by: (All media); Overseas FilmGroup (World-wide); VHS (USA) Vidmark Entertainment (Germany) RCA/Columbia Pictures International Video
- Release date: 1990
- Country: United States
- Language: English

Lockdown is a 1990 film about a detective that is framed for a crime he didn't commit and is sent to prison. Directed by Frank Harris, the film starred Richard Lynch, Chris DeRose, Chuck Jeffreys, Elizabeth Kaitan and Joe Estevez.

== Story ==
A detective has been wrongfully framed for a murder of his partner and is then sent to prison for 15 years to life. Inside, it's a battle just to get through each day. In order to prove his innocence he has to effect a plan to escape, and the only way he can prove himself innocent is do it on the outside. He has to confront the gangster that set him up.

== Background ==
The story was written by Joseph Izzo and Joseph Mangelli. The music was provided by Bob Mamet.

It was released on DVD in March 2001.

== Cast ==
Cast
Name	Role
Richard Lynch	James Garrett
Chris DeRose	Ron Taylor
Chuck Jeffreys	Mac Maguire
Elizabeth Kaitan	Monica Taylor
Joe Estevez	Dieter
Mike Farrell	Prentis
Larry Mintz	Johnny
Gary Kalpakoff	Shanks
Diane Stevenett	District Attorney Parker
Will Roberts	Young cop
Elizabeth Rowin	Lab technician
Chelsea Soggin	Katie

== Releases ==
Title	Release info	Year	Time	Notes
Lockdown	Vidmark Entertainment VM 5374		90 min	VHS
Lockdown	RCA, Columbia Pictures CVT 12116		91 min	VHS
Lockdown	Image Entertainment	2001		DVD
