= The Weight of the Nation =

2012 American television documentary

- Genre: Documentary
- Written by: Dan Chaykin
- Country of origin: United States
- Original language: English
- No. of episodes: 4

Production
- Executive producers: Sheila Nevins; John Hoffman
- Producer: Sarah Teale
- Production company: HBO Documentary Films

Original release
- Network: HBO
- Release: May 14, 2012

The Weight of the Nation is a four-part documentary series produced by American cable television network HBO.

== Overview ==
Addressing the growing obesity epidemic in the United States, it was first aired in May 2012. The documentary series included collaboration with National Institutes of Health, Centers for Disease Control and Prevention and the Institute of Medicine. The series was produced by John Hoffman.

The scientific commentators featured in the documentary include Francis Collins, Samuel Klein, Rudolph Leibel, Robert Lustig, and Kelly D. Brownell.

== Episodes ==
The series consists of four approximately hour-long films:

1. Consequences
2. Choices
3. Children in Crisis
4. Challenges
