= Dealing dogs =

Dealing dogs may refer to:

- The sale of animals to research labs
- Dealing Dogs (film), a 2006 HBO documentary film about the sale of shelter dogs to research labs
