= Jungo TV =

American entertainment company

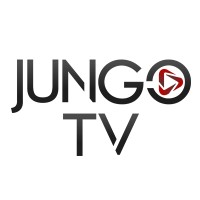
- Type: Private (Joint venture)
- Industry: Entertainment, cable and satellite television, Over-the-top media service
- Founded: 2016; 10 years ago
- Founder: Nasser Kazeminy; Mehmet Oz; George Chung; Sandy Climan
- Headquarters: Los Angeles, California, United States
- Key people: Nasser Kazeminy (Chairman / Co-Founder); George Chung (Chief Executive Officer / Co-Founder); Miguel Santos (Chief Content Officer); David Liao (Chief Business Officer); Trang Nguyen (Chief Administrative Officer)
- Brands: Jungo+; Jungo Pinoy; Black Belt+; Combat Go; Hallypop; Front Row Channel; OZ Tube; PlanetOut; Kick Flix; ES24
- Website: jungotv.com jungoplus.com jungopinoy.com

Jungo TV, LLC (or Jungo) is a privately held media company that owns and operates television channels and streaming apps founded in 2016. Jungo TV is headquartered in Los Angeles with offices in San Diego, Mumbai, and Manila.

== History ==
Jungo TV was founded in 2016 by Nasser Kazeminy, Dr. Mehmet Oz, Sandy Climan and George Chung.

== International expansion ==
The company specializes in providing film and television content internationally through pay television providers and OTT platforms, and partnership with third-party media companies such as Ethnic Channel Groups, Cinedigm, MX Player, Bharti Airtel, GMA, VTVCab, and ABS-CBN.

As of September 2020, Jungo TV reached over 2 billion views monthly and entertaining audiences globally across all devices as per the report.

== Partnerships ==
In 2018, the company partnered with Seoul Broadcasting System (SBS) to launch the digital first Kpop Asian Pop Culture network Hallypop.

In September 2019, Jungo TV partnered with the media division of Hinduja Group to bring an international slate of Video-on-demand (VOD) services in India.

Jungo TV launched their digital-first linear channels "Combat Go" and Hallypop on Stirr, an American ad-supported streaming service owned by Sinclair Broadcast Group.

In November 2019, Jungo TV partnered with Durga Jasraj's entertainment programming company "Art and Artistes (AAA)" to launch music platform 'Waah'.

Jungo TV was partnered with Verizon Media to power Global Ad Network.

Partnered with other notable companies such as Amazon Fire TV, LG and Apple TV+ and MX Player for broader reach.

In April 2020, the company partnered with Black Belt (magazine) to host the world's first Virtual Global Martial arts seminar called "Fight Back".

In September 2020, Jungo TV partnered with GMA Network and launched Hallypop, Asian Pop-culture Digital Channel in the Philippines.

In July 2021, Jungo TV launched a streaming app in the Philippines called Jungo Pinoy, in partnership with Dito Telecommunity. It features live TV channels and the largest Tagalog-dubbed movie library in the world.

== Milestones ==
=== 2016 ===
- Company was co-founded in 2016 by Nasser Kazeminy, Mehmet Oz, George Chung and Sandy Climan.

=== 2018 ===
- Launched company's first free ad supported TV channel Combat Go on Twitch and expanded distribution to include Roku Channel, Pluto TV, Xumo, and Stirr.

=== 2019 ===
- Launched Asian pop culture free ad supported TV channel Hallypop with SBS on Samsung TV Plus, Stirr, and Vizio.
- Partnered with GMA Network in the Philippines.
- Partnered with Art & Artistes to represent the biggest Indian music library across the world and also launched the world's first linear traditional Indian music channel Waah.

=== 2020 ===
- Partnered with MX Player in India with over 500 hours of VOD content and linear television channels.
- Partnered with Black Belt Magazine for Fight Back, world's first virtual martial arts event, for the benefit of American Red Cross’ relief efforts to support frontline responders during the COVID-19 pandemic
- Launched Hallypop with GMA Network in the Philippines

=== 2021 ===
- Launched its direct-to-consumer app Jungo+ globally on mobile and connected TV devices.

=== 2022 ===
- Launched its direct-to-consumer app called Jungo Pinoy in the Philippines, United States, Canada, Saudi Arabia, United Arab Emirates, and Bahrain on mobile devices.

== Video On Demand (VOD) ==
=== OzTube (Health and Wellness) ===
OzTube.com is the digital video platform spinoff of The Dr. Oz Show. Programming is curated to expand Dr. Oz's audience demographic who seek information on medical, diet, beauty, fitness, meditation and wellness topics.

=== Go Russia (Russian entertainment on Amazon Prime) ===
Go Russia features dramas, comedies, and new and classic movies from CTC Media, TV Centre, and Ivi.ru, including Petrovka, 38, Kitchen, and ABVGDeyka.

=== YouTube MCN ===
Jungo TV in partnership with European media agency Greater Fool Media (GFM) runs a boutique YouTube Multi-Channel Network. With 400 managed and owned and operated channels, Jungo TV currently boasts of 2Bn monthly minutes viewed on the network.

Jungo TV has partnered with the following major YouTube creator networks like Dr. Oz, Deepak Chopra, Jordan Peterson, World of Dance, Brooke Burke, Dr. Drew Pinsky, Black Belt Magazine, Radio Caracas Televisión, Anusha Dandekar among others.

=== Jungo+ ===
Jungo+ was launched as a standalone global video-on-demand streaming service of Jungo TV that features the full catalog of international live channels, as well as contents consist of movies and programming seasons or episodes of programs, series and shows. Jungo Plus is available globally either as an ad-supported platform or as a premium service.

=== Jungo Pinoy ===
Jungo Pinoy is a subscription entertainment streaming mobile app catered to the Filipino diaspora featuring the largest Tagalog-dubbed movie library in the world. It also has a large free library of movies and TV shows.

== Current channels ==
- Hallypop (Asian pop culture channel)
- Combat Go (Global Combat Sports Channel)
- Front Row Channel (International Music Channel)
- eSport 24/7 (ESports)
- Scream Flix (Horror Movie Channel)
- Toro TV (Men's TV Channel)
- Black Belt TV (Martial Arts and Training)
- A8 Esports (ESports)
- Cinemundo Pinoy (Filipino-dubbed entertainment, movies and TV shows)
- Impact Wrestling (Professional wrestling)

== Board of directors ==
- Nasser Kazeminy (Co-Founder and Chairman)
- William Pope
- Ahmet Calik
- Sandy Climan
- Robert Priddy
- George Chung (media executive)
- John Sculley
