= Aftershock (1990 film) =

- Directed by: Frank Harris
- Written by: Michael Standing
- Produced by: Bonaire Film; Spectrum Entertainment
- Starring: Jay Roberts Jr. James Lew; Michael Standing; Elizabeth Kaitan; John Saxon
- Music by: Bob Mamet
- Distributed by: Overseas Filmgroup
- Release date: 7 April 1990
- Running time: 91 minutes
- Country: United States
- Language: English

Aftershock (or After Shock) is a 1990 action/science fiction film directed by Frank Harris, written by Michael Standing, starring James Lew and Michael Standing. It was distributed through Overseas Filmgroup and filmed in 1988.

== Plot ==
After an event which appears to have been World War III (the cause is not explained in the movie) Commander Eastern becomes the leader of a futuristic society in a post-apocalyptic world. The society is fascist and the citizens have a bar code tattooed on them. They no longer openly question their leaders. A radio host called "Big Sister" supports the efforts of the fascists, while paramilitary groups patrol the city.

A group of rebels, led by Col. Slater, seek to end the fascist rule. Willie (Jay Roberts, Jr.) and Danny (Chuck Jeffries) are two of those being held as troublemakers in prison. An alien, Sabrina, who has been observing the planet since the war, decides to visit Earth and unintentionally involves herself in the battle between the rebels and the fascists. She is captured by the security forces and is questioned by Oliver Quinn (John Saxon), who is the leader of the paramilitary. As she does not fully understand English, she is unable to answer any of Quinn's questions.

Sabrina ultimately ends up in prison with several of the rebels, including Willie and Danny. Sabrina explains, in broken English, that her people intercepted a NASA probe and misinterpreted the data on the probe as Earth having an idealist society. She had traveled to Earth hoping to find ways to improve her society.

In order to return home, Sabrina must get back to her landing site to use an energy cycle to return to her planet. After Sabrina, Willie, and Danny break out of the prison they head to the rebel's headquarters. Quinn is planning an assault on the rebel base.

Sabrina is captured by a bounty hunter, (Chris De Rose), who gives her to Quinn. She again escapes. As the rebels regroup and Sabrina gets their computers working, they stage an attack on the fascist forces. Sabrina returns home as the rebels vow to continue to fight.

== Cast ==
- James Lew as Mr. James
- Michael Standing as Gruber
- Elizabeth Kaitan as Sabina
- Jay Roberts Jr. as Willie
- Chris DeRose as Brandt
- John Saxon as Oliver Quinn
- Deanna Oliver as Dancer
- Russ Tamblyn as Hank Franklin
- Matthias Hues as Cassidy
- Michael Berryman as Queen
- Chuck Jeffreys as Danny Girrard
- Christopher Mitchum as Colonel Slater
- Richard Lynch as Commander Eastern
- Patricia McPherson as Girl In Bar

== Reception ==
Creature Feature gave the movie 2 out of 5 stars, praising staging of the martial art fights and the performance of Russ Tamblyn, but found little else to like Kim Newman found the movie to be cheap and repetitive. TV Guide gave the movie one of four stars, calling in a collection of post-apocalyptical clichés, although it noted that the cast was better than in many movies of this genre.

== Home Release ==
Released on VHS in 1990 and on DVD in 2001. As of September 2020, the movie is available to stream on Amazon Prime.
