= Adventures with Kanga Roddy =

Children's television series

- Genre: Children's television series; Educational; Adventure; Musical
- Created by: George Chung; Anthony Chan
- Starring: Karen Lott; Jennifer Montana; Pat Morita
- Voices of: Mickey Thomas
- Country of origin: United States
- Original language: English
- No. of seasons: 2
- No. of episodes: 26

Production
- Executive producers: Joe Montana; Ronnie Lott
- Running time: 27 minutes
- Production companies: American Champion Entertainment; KTEH; PeopleNet

Original release
- Network: PBS Kids
- Release: April 4, 1998 – 2000

Adventures with Kanga Roddy is a children's television series created by martial arts masters George Chung and Anthony Chan and executive produced by former 49ers Joe Montana and Ronnie Lott.

== Premise ==
Each episode of the Kanga Roddy series focuses on a group of children at a community center and their teachers (played by Jennifer Montana and Karen Lott, wives of former San Francisco 49ers football players, Joe Montana and Ronnie Lott), working on activities such as reading, physical fitness and arts and crafts. During these activities, the children encounter an ethical or social problem, which cause uneasiness or unhappiness among some of the children. The teachers sense the problem and suggest that the children seek help from their friend Uncle Pat, the proprietor of a rare bookstore, played by actor Pat Morita. Uncle Pat, with the assistance of his pet bookworm, Shakespeare, magically transports the children to the land of Hi-Yah where Kanga Roddy lives. Once in the land of Hi-Yah, Kanga Roddy and his friends Bantu - a female African snake, Tackle Bear - his workout partner, Cimbop and Kimbop - a pair of feline sisters, and Zatochi - a wise old snow monkey, help the children solve their problem by giving examples presented through songs. Kanga Roddy gets inspiration for a proper solution to the problem through flashbacks to lessons learned from his martial arts teacher Zatochi or parallels drawn from encounters with his buddy Tackle Bear. The children and the costumed cast present the answers in song and dance routines. When the children return to the community center, they review what they have learned with their teachers.

== Cast ==
- Pat Morita as Uncle Pat, a wise bookseller who owns a rare book store next to the community center. He was educated at Oxford, and his love for knowledge has taken him around the world. In his spare time, he tries to read every book in the store! He loves to pass along the knowledge and wisdom he's gained in his travels and his reading. The bookstore is a magical window to the world, where he can send the children to the land of Hiyah so that their questions may be answered by a combination of wisdom and reflection. Uncle Pat's philosophy is this: a smart person is not one who knows all the answers, but one who knows the right questions
- Jennifer Montana as Miss Lisa, a former professional volleyball player who graduated from UCLA with a master's degree in physical education. She teaches physical education at the community center, where she shares her knowledge about teamwork and team spirit with the children, and helps them learn how to use these principles in handling problems.
- Karen Lott as Miss Becky, an artist by trade who studied art with many great masters at the Sorbonne in Paris. She finds great satisfaction in teaching kids a love of art. Miss Becky has a group of celebrity friends whom she knows as a result of her work, and she brings many of them to the community center to share their knowledge with the children
- Marissa Cheung as Amy, a very smart girl. When she grows up, she wants to be President of the United States, or the leader of a large company. She is an unusual combination of quiet and bossy. Amy doesn't say very much, but when she does, it's important!
- Tyler Johnson as Billy, the class clown! He's very smart and sometimes he can be very arrogant. Billy's silliness has caused people to be upset, so he is learning restraint and respect for the feelings of other people.
- Jafar Woods as Dwain, a dancer, and he is smart, solid, and cool. He has asthma, and works hard to overcome it so that he can succeed in his ambition to become an athlete when he grows up.
- Cori Najarian as Kelly, happiest when she's the center of attention. She has the most to learn about social skills and other people's feelings. Kelly sings like an angel and wants to be an actress when she grows up.
- Alison Miller as T.J., a singer and dancer with lots of personality. She has amazing artistic talent, which allow her to hide the fact that she isn't the best student. T.J. is learning that she needs to apply herself more to her studies.
- Kamela Portuges as Shakespeare, the bookworm, is Uncle Pat's daffy, overly dramatic companion. She is so caught up in the books and information that she is overwhelmed and has a hard time seeing the forest for the trees. Her confusion is a constant source of bemused irritation to Uncle Pat.

=== Land of Hiyah ===
from left: Tackle Bear, Chaka, and Kanga Roddy

- Mickey Thomas (voice) and James Harris (costume) as Kanga Roddy, a seven-foot tall kangaroo who is a master of the martial arts. His philosophy is to never use the martial arts to fight or hurt anyone. Kanga Roddy acts as the children's teacher while they are in the land of Hiyah. He teaches by example and is able to guide the children to find their own answers rather than impose his own. Kanga Roddy understands that every day there is something new the world can teach us.
- Tony Lindsay as Tackle Bear, full of energy much like his best friend, Kanga Roddy. However, he lacks the intelligence, insightfulness and patience that Kanga Roddy has. Although Tackle Bear always means well, he lacks the ability to articulate the message. He is physically very capable and strong, but he shoots from the hip and sometimes could be a loose cannon when it comes to words, thereby giving comic relief. He only appears in the second season.
- Jeanie Tracy (voice) and Lee Armstrong (puppetry) as Bantu, a soul-singing mamba snake. Her purity comes from the heart and she could never harm a soul because she is filled with love and compassion. Her wisdom comes from her wealth of musical knowledge and she teaches lessons of wisdom and love through her songs. She only appears in the first season.
- Pat Morita (voice) and Lee Armstrong (puppetry) as Zatochi, a thousand-year old snow monkey who is from the mountains of the Himalayas. He is different from most in that he lives his life backwards, starting with great wisdom and getting younger and more vital with each passing day. He is as comfortable with an ancient scroll of knowledge as he is surfing the web on his ultrafast laptop computer. Zatochi's greatest love has always been the martial arts and he has trained many great people through time, including Kanga Roddy.
- Kamela Portuges and Lee Armstrong as Kimbop and Cimbop, a pair of feline sisters. They only appear in the second season.
- Yippee Coyote (Jimmy Chin) as Chaka, an old friend of Kanga Roddy and Tackle Bear. They used to do everything together, until Chaka had to move away. Kanga and Tackle missed him terribly, and walked around feeling sad all the time until they realized that as long as they had their memories of Chaka, he would always be there in their hearts. People may have to go away, but memories last forever. He only appears in a flashback in the episode "Try to Remember".

== Episodes ==
=== Series overview ===
Season	Episodes	Originally released	
Season	Episodes	First released	Last released
1	13	April 4, 1998	TBA
2	13	TBA	TBA

=== Season 1 (1998–99) ===
No. overall	No. in season	Title	Original release date
1	1	"It's Cool To Be Kind"	April 12, 1998
Billy's arrogant behavior is more than anyone can take. Kanga Roddy and the kids teach Billy respect through songs and examples of courtesy, kindness, and listening skills.
2	2	"Promises, Promises"	April 11, 1998
Kelly promises Dwain she'll go with him to his dance recital. Later that day, Miss Becky asks Kelly to go to a cool concert on the same day as the recital. Kanga Roddy helps Kelly learn how important it is to keep her word.
3	3	"Facing Your Fear"	April 5, 1998
When T.J. tells everyone she is afraid to go camping, the kids and Kanga Roddy help her learn that facing her fear is better than running from it.
4	4	"I Like You Just The Way You Are"	April 18, 1998
When Gary, a physically challenged boy in a wheelchair, shows up to play football, the children will not allow him to play. Kanga Roddy teaches the children that everyone is special in their own way.
5	5	"It's So Hard To Be Humble"	April 25, 1998
When Dwain wins his dance competition easily, he is full of himself, and his behavior begins to isolate him from the other children. Kanga Roddy teaches the children that being humble goes along with being talented.
6	6	"Try, Try Again"	April 4, 1998
Billy strikes out in baseball one time too many. Kanga Roddy teaches him that there is always something positive to learn from your failures.
7	7	"Everybody Do Your Share"	April 19, 1998
Kelly and Shakespeare resent doing their chores. Kanga Roddy teaches them that everyone has responsibilities and that it's important for everybody to do their share.
8	8	"Just Want To Be Me"	April 26, 1998
Sarah is embarrassed by her new braces. Kanga Roddy teaches her that our looks do not make us who we are.
9	9	"Honesty Is The Best Policy"	January 2, 1999
Sarah finds a lovely necklace and the children are happy that she has a newly found treasure. Kanga Roddy teaches them a lesson in the importance of returning other's belongings.
10	10	"Grandpa Is Cool"	TBA
Jordon doesn't want to hang out with her grandfather. Kanga Roddy teaches her that everyone should appreciate their elders, and wisdom and knowledge come with age.
11	11	"Equal As Can Be"	January 9, 1999
The boys do not think that karate is for girls. Kanga Roddy teaches them that everyone should get a chance and that boys and girls should be treated equally
12	12	"We Are Family"	January 3, 1999
Kelly is disappointed that her family can't go with her to the upcoming picnic. Kanga Roddy teaches her that family extends beyond immediate family members. Family can be the ones that love and take care of her.
13	13	"Sharing Can Be So Easy"	January 10, 1999
Tensions rise when the children become selfish with their own possessions. Kanga Roddy teaches them the importance of sharing among each other.

=== Season 2 (2000) ===
No. overall	No. in season	Title	Original release date
14	1	"Yummy, Yummy Food"	TBA
When T. J. fusses about eating, Kanga Roddy teaches her an important lesson about nutrition and how healthy food makes our body strong.
15	2	"Sibling Rivalry"	TBA
Dwain's sister Brittany copies everything Dwain does. Kanga Roddy teaches Dwain that imitation is his sister's way of showing admiration.
16	3	"Friends To the End"	TBA
Kelly ignores her friends for a cool girl on the block. Kanga Roddy teaches her that loyalty means standing by your friends.
17	4	"Try To Remember"	TBA
When Sarah's dog Shamrock dies, Kanga Roddy teaches her that remembering good times with her dog can keep him in her heart forever.
18	5	"I Want To Be Big"	TBA
Luke wants to play football but can't because he thinks he is too small. Kanga Roddy teaches him that determination can overcome size and strength.
19	6	"Winning Isn't Everything"	TBA
When Dwain loses to Kelly in a competition, he displays a bad attitude. Kanga Roddy teaches him that sportsmanship is not whether you win or lose, but being proud to be in the game.
20	7	"Please Don't Tease"	TBA
The kids all tease Charlie for being clumsy. Kanga Roddy teaches them that words can hurt and it is important to be sensitive to other's feelings.
21	8	"Visit the Dentist"	TBA
Brittany is frightened to go to the dentist. Kanga Roddy teaches her to breathe, relax and calm her mind.
22	9	"The Music Lesson"	TBA
Amy gets teased for wanting to practice her saxophone instead of going to the ball game. Kanga Roddy teaches the children that it is important to encourage Amy in pursuit of her interest.
23	10	"Be Flexible"	TBA
When Kelly displays her disappointment for not having things her way, Kanga Roddy and the children teach her that flexibility means being ready to try other things.
24	11	"Daddy Doesn't Live Here Any More"	July 1, 2000
Dwain's parents are getting divorced. Kanga Roddy reassures him that just because his parents are not together doesn't mean they don't love him any more.
25	12	"Money Doesn't Grow On Trees"	TBA
Money-spending Amanda learns a lesson in value from Kanga Roddy and realizes that money is something people work hard for – it doesn't grow on trees.
26	13	"A New Baby"	July 8, 2000
T. J. gets upset when her new baby sister gets all the attention, until Kanga Roddy teaches her that being a big sister is a very important role.

== Production ==
The show was created by martial arts masters George Chung and Anthony Chan who wanted to change the perception of the arts created by shows like Teenage Mutant Ninja Turtles and Power Rangers which exploit violence and instead wanted families to focus on the philosophical elements of martial arts—honor, courage and respect. Initially 13 half-hour episodes of the Kanga Roddy series were produced. One month after its debut, KTEH ordered 26 additional episodes and two one hour specials. The final broadcast of Adventures with Kanga Roddy occurred March 31, 2001 with an airing of episode 12 'We Are Family'; the following month, the show was dropped from KTEH's schedule for good. Pat Morita was hesitant about taking on the role of Uncle Pat as he didn't want to be associated primarily with martial arts due to his role in The Karate Kid, but decided to take the role of deciding that was just the price of fame.

== Merchandise ==
An interactive CD-ROM was produced by Brighter Child featuring the character of Kanga Roddy.

== Home media ==
In December 1998, it was reported Blockbuster had signed a deal to carry "Adventures with Kanga Roddy" VHSs at their stores for January 1999.

The series had the following VHS releases:

VHS title	Episode(s)	Release date
"Honesty is the Best Policy"	‘Honesty is the Best Policy’	October 1, 1998
"Daddy Doesn't Live Here Anymore"	‘Daddy Doesn't Live Here Anymore’	October 1, 1998
"Please Don't Tease"	‘Please Don't Tease’	October 1, 1998
"Adventures With Kanga Roddy Vol. 1"	‘Try, Try Again’ ‘Facing your Fear’	October 1, 1998
"Adventures With Kanga Roddy Vol. 2"	‘Promises Promises’ ‘Hard to be Humble’	October 1, 1998
"Adventures With Kanga Roddy Vol. 3"	‘I Like You Just The Way You Are’ ‘Everybody Do Your Share’	October 1, 1998
