= Samuel Klein =

Samuel Klein may refer to:

- Samuel Klein (businessman) (1923–2014), founder of the Casas Bahia chain of stores in Brazil
- Samuel Klein (doctor), doctor and nutritional expert based at Washington University
- Samuel Klein (scholar) (1886–1940), historian and geography researcher of the Land of Israel
- Samuel Klein (1886–1942), founder of S. Klein department stores
- Sam Klein (soccer), Australian footballer
- Sam Klein, lead character in the Allan Levine series by the same name
