= John Mark Robinson =

American actor

- Born: July 19, 1948 (age 78); Toronto, Ontario
- Education: American Academy of Dramatic Arts
- Occupations: Entrepreneur, Director, Producer, Actor
- Years active: 1973–present
- Spouse: Linda DeScenna
- Children: 3

John Mark Robinson (born 19 July 1948) is an entrepreneur, director, and actor. Films he directed have included Roadhouse 66, Kid, and All Tied Up. He also directed the music videos for various musical artists including Bob Dylan, Tina Turner, Ramones, Pretenders, Bob Seger and Santana. Robinson is the founder and CEO of Tap&Go EV Ltd., owner operator of Vancouver Prop & Costume, and President of Boffi Los Angeles, having previously served as president of Modern Props. Robinson holds Patent No. 10,277,960 for his co-invention of a method and system for seeding video programs with episodic interactive items.

== Early life ==
Robinson was born in Toronto, Ontario. He graduated from the American Academy of Dramatic Arts in New York.

== Music, television, and film career ==
Robinson founded the Modern Productions in 1980 to direct and produce music videos for artists under the banner. In 1983, he directed Roadhouse 66, starring Willem Dafoe, released by Universal Pictures. In 1990, he directed the movie Kid released by Focus Features. Robinson directed the television show Martha Stewart Living in 1991. He also directed the movie Motowns Mustang in 1992 and All Tied Up in 1993.

During his career, Robinson has directed and produced music videos for Bob Dylan ("Sweetheart Like You"), Bob Marley ("Redemption Song"), Pretenders, Tina Turner ("What's Love Got to Do with It?"), Ramones ("Rock 'n' Roll High School"), Santana ("Hold On"), Pat Benatar, and George Thorogood ("Bad to the Bone").

== Design career ==
Robinson is also a design professional, having served as president of Modern Props in both Los Angeles and Vancouver. He is the owner and operator of Vancouver Prop & Costume in Vancouver, British Columbia, as well as a partner in the Milanese a kitchen and bath design company Boffi Los Angeles. Vancouver Prop & Costume rents props and costumes for use in motion pictures, commercials, and television. Robinson has assembled tens of thousands of pieces that can be used. He purchased the selection of props from 20th Century Fox in 2005, and has continued to build the collection. He later founded Tap Media Labs, a company that adds content information to online videos for viewers, based in Vancouver and Los Angeles.

== Personal life ==
Robinson married Linda DeScenna in 2017.

== Discography ==
=== Music videos ===
Year	Track	Artist	Records
1983	Sweetheart Like You	Bob Dylan	CBS Records
1980	Redemption Song	Bob Marley	Island Records
1982	Hold On / The Nile	Carlos Santana	CBS Records
1982	Makin' Thunderbirds	Bob Seger	Capitol Records
1980	Rock'n'Roll Radio	Ramones	Sire Records
1980	Rock'n'Roll High School	Ramones	Sire Records
1984	What's Love Got to Do with It	Tina Turner	Capitol Records
1982	Bad to the Bone	George Thorogood	EMI Records
1979 1980 1984	Brass in Pocket Tattooed Love Boys Show Me	The Pretenders	Warner Bros. Records
1982	Think I'm In Love Shakin	Eddie Money	CBS Records
1987	Set Me Free	Los Lobos	Warner Bros. Records
1986	When You Love Someone Back in Stride Again	Frankie Beverly and Maze	Capitol Records
1984 1983 1983	Solid Babies High Rise	Ashford & Simpson	Capitol Records

=== Credits ===
Year	Television	Role	Notes
1981	The Facts of Life	Actor	
1979	In Search of Historic Jesus (Documentary)	Actor	
1979	Butch and Sundance: The Early Days	Actor	
1978	The Bastard	Actor	
1978	The Hardy Boys/Nancy Drew Mysteries	Actor	
1978	Eight Is Enough	Actor	
1977	The San Pedro Beach Bums	Actor	
1977	The Love Boat	Actor	
1976	One Day at a Time	Actor	
1976	Electra Woman and Dyna Girl	Actor	
1976	Mary Hartman, Mary Hartman	Actor	
1975	Harry O	Actor	
1975	Insight	Actor	
1974	Chopper One	Actor	
1973	Chase	Actor	
1973	The Six Million Dollar Man	Actor	
1973	Mod Squad	Actor	
