= Robert Tessier =

American film actor and stuntman (1934–1990)

- Born: June 2, 1934; Lowell, Massachusetts, US
- Died: October 11, 1990 (aged 56); Lowell, Massachusetts, US
- Occupations: actor, stuntman

Robert W. Tessier (June 2, 1934 – October 11, 1990) was an American actor and stuntman who was best known for playing heavy, menacing characters in films and on television.

== Early life ==
Born in Lowell, Massachusetts, of Abenaki and French descent, Tessier served as a paratrooper in the Korean War, earning both a Silver Star and two Purple Hearts.

== Performing career ==
Tessier was an accomplished motorcycle rider doing stunts in the circus. These skills helped him secure his first film role in The Born Losers directed by Tom Laughlin.

With his shaven head, size and threatening appearance, Tessier went on to play a series of villainous roles on both TV and in film.

Tessier starred as the menacing convict "Connie Shokner" in the 1974 comedy-drama The Longest Yard with Burt Reynolds (whom he counted as one of his friends) and as Kevin in The Deep. He also played alongside Charles Bronson, as a bare knuckle fighter in the film Hard Times and as a main villain in Breakheart Pass.

In his spare time, Tessier was a cabinet maker often making pieces for his co-stars.

== Death ==
Tessier died of cancer October 11, 1990, aged 56. He was survived by his six children, mother and two sisters.

== Filmography ==
- The Born Losers (1967) – Cueball (as Robert W. Tessier)
- The Glory Stompers (1967) – Magoo
- The Sidehackers (1968) – Jake (as Bob Tessier)
- Run, Angel, Run! (1969) – Gang Leader (uncredited)
- Five the Hard Way (1969) – Jake (as Bob Tessier)
- The Babysitter (1969) – Laurence Mackey
- Cry Blood, Apache (1970) – Two Card Charlie
- The Hard Ride (1971)
- The Jesus Trip (1971) – Duncan
- Private Duty Nurses (1971) – Super bouncer
- Outlaw Riders (1971) – Beans (as Bob Tessier)
- The Velvet Vampire (1971) – Biker (as Bob Tessier)
- Gentle Savage (1973) – Greywolf
- The Longest Yard (1974) – Connie Shokner
- How Come Nobody's on Our Side? (1974) – Bike Rider (as Bob Tessier)
- Doc Savage: The Man of Bronze (1975) – Dutchman
- Hard Times (1975) – Jim Henry
- Breakheart Pass (1975) – Levi Calhoun
- The Deep (1977) – Kevin
- Another Man, Another Chance (1977) – Blacksmith
- Hooper (1978) – Amtrac
- Starcrash (1979) – Chief Thor
- The Villain (1979) – Mashing Finger
- Steel (1979) – Cherokee
- The Cannonball Run (1981) – Biker (as Bob Tessier)
- The Sword and the Sorcerer (1982) – Verdugo
- Double Exposure (1982) – Bartender
- The Lost Empire (1985) – Koro
- Avenging Angel (1985) – Tattoo Artist
- The Fix (1985) – Spook
- No Safe Haven (1987) – Randy
- Future Force (1989) – Becker
- Fists of Steel (1989) - Saylor
- One Man Force (1989) - Wilson
- Beverly Hills Brats (1989) - Slick
- Nightwish (1989) – Stanley
- Fertilize the Blaspheming Bombshell (1990) – Devil-master

=== Television ===
- Kung Fu (1974) – Aztec Warrior
- Little House on the Prairie (Survival, 1975) – Chief Jack Lame Horse (as Jack Lame Horse)
- The Last of the Mohicans (1977) – Magua
- Centennial (1978–1979) – Rude Water
- Desperate Women (1978) – Outlaw (uncredited)
- Hart to Hart (1979) "Max in love" episode – Mover #1
- Starsky & Hutch (2-part episode in 1979) – Soldier
- The Billion Dollar Threat (1979) – Benjamin
- Buck Rogers in the 25th Century (2 episodes both in 1979) – Marcos Marcilka
- The Dukes of Hazzard (1980) – Mitch Henderson
- The Incredible Hulk (1980) – Johnny
- Vega$ (1980) – Sawyer
- Fantasy Island (1981) – Flynt
- The Fall Guy (1981–1986) – Thug / Harvey / Garvey / Prisoner
- CHiPs (1982) – Zorn
- The A-Team (1983–1985) – Mute / Scully
- Manimal (1983) – Sailor Poker Player (as Robert W. Tessier)
- The Rousters (1983) – Bender
- Magnum, P.I. (1984) – Murderer
- Spenser: For Hire (1985) – Conan
- Amazing Stories (1986) – Woodsman
- Sledge Hammer! (1987) – Stoolie
- B.L. Stryker (1989)
