= Meteor (film) =

1979 American science fiction film

- Theatrical release poster
- Directed by: Ronald Neame
- Screenplay by: Stanley Mann; Edmund H. North
- Story by: Edmund H. North
- Produced by: Arnold Orgolini; Theodore R. Parvin
- Starring: Sean Connery; Natalie Wood; Karl Malden; Brian Keith; Martin Landau; Trevor Howard; Richard Dysart; Henry Fonda
- Cinematography: Paul Lohmann
- Edited by: Carl Kress
- Music by: Laurence Rosenthal
- Production companies: Meteor Joint Venture; Palladium Productions; Shaw Brothers
- Distributed by: American International Pictures (North America); Warner Bros (International)
- Release date: October 19, 1979
- Running time: 107 minutes
- Countries: United States; Hong Kong
- Languages: English; Russian
- Budget: $16 million or $15.4-17 million
- Box office: $8.4 million (domestic) or $4.2 million (US rentals)

Meteor is a 1979 science-fiction disaster film directed by Ronald Neame, from a screenplay by Stanley Mann and Edmund H. North. It stars Sean Connery and Natalie Wood, along with an ensemble cast featuring Karl Malden, Brian Keith, Martin Landau, Trevor Howard, Richard Dysart and Henry Fonda.

The film's premise, which follows a group of scientists struggling with Cold War politics after an asteroid is detected to be on a collision course with Earth, was inspired by a 1967 MIT report, Project Icarus.

Meteor was released by American International Pictures on October 19, 1979. It was a box-office bomb and was panned by critics, but was nonetheless nominated for the Academy Award for Best Sound.

== Plot ==
After the asteroid Orpheus collides with a comet, dozens of fragments are sent toward Earth, including a five-mile-wide rock that will cause an extinction-level event. The United States government denies knowledge of the threat until the smaller asteroid fragments preceding the main body wreak havoc on the planet. A secret orbiting nuclear missile platform satellite named Hercules, designed by Dr. Paul Bradley, had been intended to defend Earth against such a threat as Orpheus, but was commandeered by the U.S. military to keep its weapons pointed at the Soviet Union. The government concludes that the fourteen nuclear missiles on board Hercules aren't enough to stop the asteroid.

The Americans are aware the Soviet Union has a similar weapons satellite called Peter the Great with sixteen nuclear warheads pointed at the United States. The President reveals the existence of Hercules on television, explaining its original purpose and offering the Soviets a chance to announce the existence of their own satellite weapon. To coordinate the response by both countries, Bradley requests the help of Soviet scientist Dr. Alexei Dubov. Bradley and Harry Sherwood of NASA meet Dubov and his interpreter Tatiana Donskaya at the Hercules control center located beneath Lower Manhattan. Dubov won't admit the existence of the Soviet device, and agrees to Bradley's proposal they work on the "theoretical" coordination of a "theoretical" Soviet space platform's weapons with the American platform. When more meteorite fragments strike Earth, including one inside Siberia, the Soviets finally agree to fully co-operate.

The weapons on both satellites are turned toward the incoming asteroid as smaller fragments continue to strike the planet, causing a deadly avalanche in the Swiss Alps and a tsunami that devastates Hong Kong. Scant hours away from Orpheus' impact, Peter the Great's missiles are launched at the asteroid, with Hercules's missiles to be fired forty minutes later so they strike simultaneously. Immediately prior to the launch of Hercules's missiles, a splinter fragment is detected approaching New York City. The loss of the command center would prevent Hercules from launching, but Hercules receives the signal to fire seconds before the splinter struck the city, destroying the top half of the World Trade Center twin towers, and creating a large crater in Central Park. Several workers inside the control center are killed when the facility is partially destroyed by the collapse of the building above, and the survivors are forced to work their way out through the New York subway system, trapping many when the East River floods the tunnels.

The two flights of missiles deploy into three successively larger waves. The Hercules crew reaches a crowded subway station and waits while others try to dig them out. The three successive waves of missiles strike their targets and obliterate the asteroid. The crews trapped at the subway station are rescued as radios broadcast the news that Orpheus is no longer a danger to Earth. The Americans exchange goodbyes with their counterparts who are departing on a plane for the Soviet Union.

== Cast ==
- Sean Connery as Dr. Paul Bradley
- Natalie Wood as Tatiana Donskaya
- Karl Malden as Harry Sherwood
- Brian Keith as Dr. Alexei Dubov
- Martin Landau as General Adlon
- Trevor Howard as Sir Michael Hughes
- Richard Dysart as Secretary of Defense
- Henry Fonda as The President
- Joseph Campanella as General Easton
- Bo Brundin as Rolf Manheim
- Roger Robinson as Bill Hunter
- Michael Zaslow as Sam Mason
- Bibi Besch as Helen Bradley
- Gregory Gaye as Soviet Premier
- Sybil Danning as Girl Skier
- Simon Cadell as BBC TV Reporter
- Philip Sterling as Russian Representative
- Johnny Yune as Siberian Man
- Eileen Saki as Siberian Woman
- Clyde Kusatsu as Yamashiro
- Clete Roberts as Network Newscaster
- Stu Nahan as Football Announcer
- Peter Donat as Opening Sequence Narrator (voice)

== Scientific basis ==
A voiceover at the end of the film mentions "Project Icarus", a report on the concept to use missiles to deflect an earthbound asteroid. The original Project Icarus was a student project at M.I.T., in a systems engineering class led by Professor Paul Sandorff in spring 1967. It examined methodologies that could deflect an Apollo asteroid named 1566 Icarus if it were found to be on a collision course with Earth. Time published an article about the research in June 1967. The results of the student reports were published in a book the following year.

== Production ==
Theodore R. Parvin received the idea for the story from a Saturday Review article by Isaac Asimov about a meteor hitting a major city in the United States. Parvin hired Edmund H. North to write the screenplay, and North took further inspiration from the Massachusetts Institute of Technology's Project Icarus. However, Ronald Neame and Sean Connery disliked both North's script and a rewrite by Steven Bach, so Stanley Mann was hired to completely re-write the screenplay. This led to a Writers Guild of America dispute over whether North should be credited as a co-writer.

During the writing of North's first draft, Parvin secured financing and investment from the Shaw Brothers Studio, Warner Bros. Pictures, Nippon Herald Films and American International Pictures (AIP). The film was an AIP co-production with British Hong Kong's Shaw Brothers. $2.7 million of the budget came from AIP.

Neame cast Natalie Wood as Tatiana because she was the daughter of Russian immigrants, and she worked with George Rubinstein to perfect a Leningrad accent. Alec Guinness, Yul Brynner, Rod Steiger, Maximilian Schell, Peter Ustinov, Eli Wallach, Telly Savalas, Theodore Bikel, Richard Burton and Orson Welles were each considered for the role of Dr. Dubov. Donald Pleasence was cast for the role and filmed a few scenes as the character. However, he departed the production to work on the film Sgt. Pepper's Lonely Hearts Club Band. He was replaced by Brian Keith, who had been cast as General Adlon. Keith was replaced in that role by Martin Landau. Another reason why Brian Keith was chosen to play the role of Dr. Dubov was that he could speak fluent Russian.

Principal photography took place from October 31, 1977, to January 27, 1978, mainly at MGM Studios in Culver City, California, with some location filming in Washington, D.C., St. Moritz, Switzerland, and Hong Kong. The release date was scheduled for June 15, 1979, but it was pushed back to October 19 due to special effects reshoots after special effects director Frank Van der Veer was fired.

=== Special effects ===
Veteran effects artist Frank Van de Veer's work was deemed unusable and subsequently discarded after much had already been shot, and William Cruse and Margo Anderson were hired to reshoot as many special effects as possible with what money remained in the special effects budget. Their work was also deemed unsuitable, and were also fired.

Gene Warren Jr., Robert Blalack, and Paul Kassler were hired to reshoot and complete the special effects, again with the remaining budget and just two months before the film's release. To complete the film on time, the team reused footage from the 1978 disaster film Avalanche, filmed the Hong Kong "tidal wave" scene in Los Angeles in an improvised water tank using cardboard cutouts of buildings, and used 22-inch-long nuclear missile satellite miniatures that were far too small for effective filming.

Prop designer John Zabrucky, who had previously worked only in television, provided props for the film.

=== Music ===
The film was originally supposed to receive a score by John Williams, but he was forced to leave the project after delays in the film's production.

== Premiere ==
Meteor premiered to the press prior to its October 19, 1979 on the floor of the Barringer Crater outside Winslow, Arizona, with Connery, Wood, and Landau attending, along with the producers and representatives from AIP.

== Reception ==
Meteor was widely panned by critics. In her review in The New York Times, Janet Maslin called the film "standard disaster fare", adding that "the suspense is sludgy and the character development nil".

Gene Siskel of the Chicago Tribune gave the film 1½ stars out of 4 and wrote, "Let's face it, the bottom line on a disaster film is how special are its special effects. With 'Meteor,' the answer is not very. The big meteor in the picture, hurtling toward Earth at 30,000 miles an hour, looks like something I recently found at the bottom of my refrigerator — green bread."

Variety called the acting "uniformly good", but the "principals mostly stand around waiting for the next calamity to happen ... What really matters to audiences for this kind of film, of course, is not the acting, but the visuals, and here, 'Meteor' gets good, but not great, grades."

Charles Champlin of the Los Angeles Times wrote that "against its own odds, it is—for what it intends to be—uninspired but competent, efficient, commercial and entertaining, with some random moments that are very nice indeed."

Judith Martin of The Washington Post called it "your standard 'My God — here it comes!' job, for those that like that sort of thing".

John Pym of The Monthly Film Bulletin wrote, "As effects go, and effects rather than surprises (or any real plotline) are what the producers have banked on, Meteor looks decidedly old-fashioned and second-hand."

TV Guide wrote: "An $18 million, star-studded disaster film, which in itself is a major disaster."

On Rotten Tomatoes, the film has a rating of 5% based on 22 reviews, with the site's consensus being: "Meteor is a flimsy flick with too much boring dialogue and not enough destruction. At least the pinball game is decent."

Marvel Comics published a comic book adaptation of the film by writer Ralph Macchio and artists Gene Colan and Tom Palmer in Marvel Super Special #14.

Samuel Z. Arkoff called Meteor the most difficult production ever undertaken by American International Pictures due to the high production, special effects and marketing costs. After the film flopped, the studio was forced to enter negotiations for a buyout from Filmways.

=== Accolades ===
At the 52nd Academy Awards in 1980, the film was nominated for the Academy Award for Best Sound (William McCaughey, Aaron Rochin, Michael J. Kohut and Jack Solomon). It lost to Apocalypse Now.

== See also ==
- Asteroid impact avoidance
- Impact events in fiction
- Armageddon (1998)
- Deep Impact (1998)
- Meteor (2009), a 4-hour 2-part miniseries
- Don't Look Up (2021)
