= Elizabeth Kaitan =

Hungarian actress

- Born: July 19, 1960 (age 66); Hungary
- Other names: Elizabeth Cayton; Elizabeth Katain
- Occupations: Actress; model
- Years active: 1981–1999

Elizabeth Kaitan sometimes credited as Elizabeth Cayton (born July 19, 1960) is a Hungarian actress and model.

== Career ==
Elizabeth Kaitan was a model for the Bonnie Kay Agency in New York City in the early 1980s.

Kaitan is perhaps best known for her roles in movies such as Savage Dawn (1985), Silent Night, Deadly Night Part 2 (1987) as Jennifer Statson, Friday the 13th Part VII: The New Blood (1988) as Robin Peterson, and in Vice Academy parts 3, 4, 5, and 6 as Candy, and in the cult movie Beretta's Island (1994) as Linda. She made her final film appearance in 1999.

== Filmography ==
=== Film ===
Year	Title	Role	Director
1981	Waitress!	Cowley's Office	Lloyd Kaufman; Michael Herz
1983	Zelig	German Girl (uncredited)	Woody Allen
1984	Violated	Liz Grant	Richard Cannistraro
1984	The Lonely Guy	Undisclosed role (uncredited)	Arthur Hiller
1984	Silent Madness	Barbara	Simon Nuchtern
1985	Thunder Run	Blonde	Gary Hudson
1985	Savage Dawn	Becky Sue	Simon Nuchtern
1985	Scandalous Simone	Inspector Fifi	Ted Roter
1987	Silent Night, Deadly Night Part 2	Jennifer Statson	Lee Harry
1987	Slave Girls from Beyond Infinity	Daria	Ken Dixon
1988	Necromancer	Julie Johnson	Dusty Nelson
1988	Assault of the Killer Bimbos	Lulu	Anita Rosenberg
1988	Friday the 13th Part VII: The New Blood	Robin Peterson	John Carl Buechler
1988	Twins	Secretary	Ivan Reitman
1989	Dr. Alien	Waitress	David DeCoteau
1989	Under the Boardwalk	Donna	Fritz Kiersch
1989	Roller Blade Warriors: Taken by Force	Gretchen Hope	Donald G. Jackson
1989	Night Club	Beth / Lisa	Michael Keusch
1989	Nightwish	Donna	Bruce R. Cook
1990	Aftershock	Sabina	Frank Harris
1990	The Girl I Want	Amy	David DeCoteau
1990	Lockdown	Monica Taylor	Frank Harris
1991	Il ritmo del silenzio (Desperate Crimes / Mafia Docks)	Jamie Lee	Andreas Marfori
1991	Vice Academy 3	Candy	Rick Sloane
1992	Hellroller (direct-to-video)	Lizzy	Gary J. Levinson
1993	Beretta's Island	Linda	Michael Preece
1993	Good Girls Don't	TV Announcer	Rick Sloane
1994	Night Realm	Eris	Michael Meyer
1995	Vice Academy 4	Candy	Rick Sloane
1996	Virtual Encounters	Amy	Cybil Richards
1996	Spy Hard	Helicopter Ticket Agent	Rick Friedberg
1996	South Beach Academy	Shannon McSorley	Joe Esposito
1996	Petticoat Planet	Delia Westwood	David DeCoteau
1996	Vice Academy 5	Candy	Rick Sloane
1997	The Exotic House of Wax	Angela Wingate	Cybil Richards
1998	Vice Academy 6	Candy	Rick Sloane
1999	Veronica 2030	Amy (uncredited)	Gary Graver

=== Television ===
- Trackdown: Finding the Goodbar Killer (1983)
- Encyclopedia Brown - 1 episode (1990, TV series)
- Love Street - 1 episode (1994, TV series)

=== Documentary films ===
- Invasion of the Scream Queens (1992)
- Makeover by Maddy: Need a Little Touch-Up Work My Ass (2009) (DVD-featurette)
- Jason's Destroyer: The Making of Friday the 13th Part VII - The New Blood (2009) (DVD-featurette)
- His Name Was Jason: 30 Years of Friday the 13th (2009)
- Crystal Lake Memories: The Complete History of Friday the 13th (2013)
- Slay Bells Ring Again: The Story of Silent Night, Deadly Night 2 (2018)
