= Bob Mamet =

American composer and musician

Bob Mamet is an American composer and musician. He is the paternal half-brother of playwright David Mamet.

== Select discography ==
- White Phantom (1987)
- Necromancer (1988)
- Aftershock (1990)
- Lockdown (1990)
- Caged in Paradiso (1990)
- Lakeboat (2000)
