= Hawkeye (film) =

- Film poster
- Directed by: George Chung; Leo Fong
- Written by: George Chung; Brent Mosley
- Produced by: George Chung; Chuck Jeffreys; Leo Fong
- Starring: George Chung; Chuck Jeffreys; Troy Donahue; Stan Wertlieb; Ronnie Lott; Hidy Ochiai; Elizabeth Frieje
- Cinematography: Frank Harris
- Edited by: George Chung
- Music by: Keith Eaddy
- Production company: Sunny Films
- Distributed by: Valley Studios Inc.
- Release date: December 1, 1988
- Running time: 90 minutes
- Country: United States
- Language: English

Hawkeye, aka Karate Cops, is a 1988 martial arts film that was directed by George Chung and Leo Fong. It starred George Chung, Troy Donahue, Chuck Jeffreys, Stan Wertlieb, Hidy Ochiai and Elizabeth Frieje.

== Story ==
The film is set on the Las Vegas Strip. The two main characters are Alexander "Hawkeye" Hawkamoto from Texas and Charlie Wilson. Hawkeye is a renegade cop and the other is a decorated lawman that quite convincingly resembles Eddie Murphy's character in Beverly Hills Cop. Hawkeye's best friend and former partner is involved in a shady deal, and is mysteriously killed by the mob. Hawkeye and Wilson go after the killers and are relentless in their pursuit. They come up against both the Japanese Yakuza and the Mafia.

== Background ==
The film was shot onto 35mm film and on location in Las Vegas. The film was directed by both George Chung and Leo Fong. The film which was released in 1988 has the alternate title of Karate Cops.

=== Releases ===
- Valley Studios - 90 mins

== Cast ==
- George Chung as Alexander "Hawkeye" Hawkamoto
- Troy Donahue as the Mayor
- Elizabeth Frieje as Sharon Johnson
- Chuck Jeffreys as Charles Wilson
- Ronnie Lott
- Michelle McCormick
- Richard Norton
- Hidy Ochiai
- Stan Wertlieb

== Crew ==
- Director of Photography - Frank Harris
- Production Poordinator - Markey Stein
- Executive in Charge of Production - Jerry Brassfield
- Executive Producers - Sunny Lim & George Chung
- Music - Keith Eaddy
- Director - Leo Fong
