= Nightwish (film) =

1989 American horror film

- Directed by: Bruce R. Cook
- Written by: Tucker Johnston; Don Simmons
- Produced by: Keith Walley
- Starring: Brian Thompson; Jack Starrett; Elizabeth Kaitan; Alisha Das; Clayton Rohner; Robert Tessier; Tom Dugan; Gayle Vance
- Cinematography: Sean McLin
- Edited by: William Shaffer
- Music by: Phil Davies; Mark Ryder
- Production companies: Channel Communications; Wild Street Pictures; ZIV International
- Distributed by: Wild Street Pictures
- Release dates: December 5, 1989 (United Kingdom); June 27, 1990 (United States)
- Running time: 96 minutes
- Country: United States
- Language: English

Nightwish is a 1989 American science fiction horror film directed by Bruce R. Cook and produced by Andrew Keith Walley. The film starred Brian Thompson, Jack Starrett, Elizabeth Kaitan, Alisha Das and Clayton Rohner.

== Background ==
This was the last film that actor Robert Tessier acted in.

== Plot ==
A professor (played by Jack Starrett) and four graduate students head out to a decrepit mansion in the middle of nowhere in the course of researching dreams. The students, Donna (played by Elizabeth Kaitan), Kim (played by Alisha Das), Jack (played by Clayton Rohner) and Dean (played by Brian Thompson) help the professor in his search. They are attempting to spark the interest of whatever supernatural beings are rumored to exist at this house. They find themselves chained up in the dungeon-like basement, and battle their way through aliens, ghosts, and demonic creatures in order to survive.

== Cast ==
- Clayton Rohner as Jack
- Alisha Das as Kim
- Elizabeth Kaitan as Donna
- Artur Cybulski as Bill
- Jack Starrett as Doctor
- Robert Tessier as Stanley
- Brian Thompson as Dean
- Tom Dugan as Wendall
- Gayle Vance as Fruit Stand Lady
- John Hayden as Fruit Stand Boy
- Jared Coulter as Ghost Boy
- Kazuko Ohashi as Slug Girl #1
- Elizabeth Hegyes as Slug Girl #2
- Joanne House as Title Sequence Model

== Reception ==
Rue Morgue reviewed the film in 2019, noting that "There are a number of beautiful green-lit dream sequences and séances in Nightwish that give off a Re-Animator vibe, which makes sense because the Art Director worked on both films."
