= Necromancer (1988 film) =

1988 film by Dusty Nelson

- Promotional poster
- Directed by: Dusty Nelson
- Written by: William T. Naud
- Produced by: William J. Males; Roy McAree; Michael Scordino
- Starring: Elizabeth Kaitan; John Tyler; Rhonda Dorton; Stan Hurwitz; Edward A. Wright; Shawn Eisner; Russ Tamblyn; Lois Masten
- Cinematography: Eric Cayla; Richard Clabaugh
- Edited by: Carole A. Kenneally
- Music by: Kevin Klingler; Bob Mamet; Gary Stockdale
- Distributed by: Bonaire Film; Spectrum Entertainment
- Release date: March 12, 1989 (U.S.)
- Running time: 88 minutes
- Country: United States
- Language: English

Necromancer is a 1988 American supernatural horror film directed by Dusty Nelson and starring Elizabeth Kaitan, John Tyler, Rhonda Dorto, Stan Hurwitz, Edward A. Wright, and Russ Tamblyn. The story follows a young woman who is raped by a group of men, and contacts a necromancer to exact her revenge.

== Synopsis ==
Three friends, Paul, Carl, and Allan, break into their professor's office to steal the answers for an important test. What they do not know is that they are not alone. Fellow student Julie Johnson is finishing some work when she spots Allan. It is not long before the three of them gang up on Julie. While Carl holds her, Paul pulls out a knife and threatens to cut her, only to cut off her underwear and rape her as the others watch on. Soon after, they threaten and blackmail her to keep quiet.

The next day, Julie is upset about the night before. She confides in her best friend, Freda, who tries to persuade her to go to the police, but Julie refuses. Later that day, Freda finds an advertisement in a newspaper advertising 'revenge'. She and Julie make inquiries into the advertisement and go to a house owned by a strange woman who casts a spell to summon a demon to exact vengeance against those who attacked Julie.

== Cast ==
- Elizabeth Kaitan as Julie Johnson (credited as Elizabeth Cayton)
- John Tyler as Eric Freiden
- Rhonda Dorto as Freda Lurch
- Stan Hurwitz as Paul DuShane
- Edward A. Wright as Carl Caulder
- Shawn Eisner as Allan
- Russ Tamblyn as Charles DeLonge
- Lois Masten as Necromancer
- David Flynn as David
- Lisa Randolph as Mary
- Lisa Beth Wilson as Linda
- Scott Harrison as Romeo
- Kieth Burns as Gus
- Carla Baron as Gail
- Jimmy Williams as Lecherous Guard
- Shannon McLeod as Edna
- Waide Aaron Riddle as Ernest

== Soundtrack ==
As of yet, the film's soundtrack has not been released. The film score was produced by Kevin Klingler and Music Pac Services Inc. Music for the soundtrack was produced by Jacaranda Music Inc.

The main soundtrack music includes:

- "Call of the Wild" - performed by Andy Landis
  — Written by Andy Landis, Howard Benson and Steve Elliot.
- "Killer Love" - performed by Curt Cuomo
  — Written by Judeth Randell, Curt Cuomo and Rick Buche.
- "Turnaround" - performed by Trapper
  — Written by Richard Thibodeau (available from BMI Records).

== Release ==
=== Home media ===
Necromancer was released in several countries on VHS format. In the United States, the film was released on DVD by Image Entertainment on September 26, 2000. Home distribution rights were later acquired by Millennium Entertainment, releasing the film on September 7, 2005.

In the United Kingdom, the film was initially available on VHS from CBS/Fox Video, while the DVD was made available via Lionsgate Home Entertainment on September 10, 2012.

Vinegar Syndrome released the film on Blu-ray in 2020 as part of their Vinegar Syndrome Archive collection, limited to 4,000 units.

== Reception ==
The film has received a negative critical reception. On Rotten Tomatoes, the film has a "rotten" score of 22%.

== Sources ==
- Heller-Nicholas, Alexandra (2021). Rape-Revenge Films: A Critical Study (Second ed.). Jefferson, North Carolina: McFarland. ISBN 978-1-476-64490-5.
