= Slave Girls from Beyond Infinity =

1987 film by Ken Dixon

- Directed by: Ken Dixon
- Written by: Ken Dixon
- Produced by: Don Daniel
- Starring: Elizabeth Kaitan; Cindy Beal; Brinke Stevens; Don Scribner; Carl Horner
- Distributed by: Full Moon Features
- Release date: 1987
- Running time: 74 minutes
- Country: United States
- Language: English
- Budget: $90,000

Slave Girls from Beyond Infinity is a 1987 sexploitation film that utilises the premise of the frequently-adapted 1924 short story "The Most Dangerous Game" by Richard Connell, setting it on an alien world and populating it with bikini-clad space prison escapees and weird space monsters. It was directed by Ken Dixon and stars Elizabeth Kaitan, Cindy Beal, Brinke Stevens, Don Scribner, and Carl Horner.

The film combines the typical themes of women in prison film with those of science fiction. The women's prison is depicted as a Soviet-style gulag. The film was the topic of a political controversy in 1992, when Senator Jesse Helms cited it as an example of indecent films that should not be broadcast by cable channels. Helms' attempt to introduce a new censorship standard for cable television was blocked by a 1996 decision of the United States Supreme Court.

== Plot ==
Daria and Tisa, two nubile female prisoners, clad only in rough-cut rabbit skin bikinis, break out of their cell in a space gulag, overpower their guards, and escape in a shuttlecraft.

The ship mysteriously malfunctions and the girls crash land on a nearby habitable world where they become the guests of Zed, a man with a scarred face who lives in a large fortress. He is the planet’s sole sentient inhabitant and is guarded by two robots who also act as the fortress' keepers.

Given new clothes, the girls are invited to join Zed for an evening meal at his table. At dinner, the two girls meet two other survivors from another crash-landing who are also Zed’s guests, Rik and his sister Shala. They warn the girls that something is not right about Zed and that other survivors of their crash have disappeared.

A late night visit to Zed’s secret trophy room reveals all. The walls are lined with the heads of dozens of Zed’s previous guests whom he hunted for sport.

Realizing they're next, Rik and Daria sneak out into the jungle several hours before dawn to set traps and survey the area. In the meantime, Zed takes Shala prisoner and rapes her to goad Rik into participating in the hunt. Zed sends an android to ensure the guests are in bed where they're supposed to be, but Rik and Daria are still out. Tisa intercepts the android on its way to check the rooms and distracts it by going skinny dipping. Eventually, Zed goes up to check the rooms himself. As Rik and Daria are coming in the window, they hear Zed approaching, strip, and jump into bed, pretending to have been having sex. Once Zed leaves, the pretend sex becomes real sex, and the two lie in bed talking about having found purpose and contentment.

The next morning, Rik is forced into the hunt and becomes Zed's trophy. Daria and Tisa attempt to escape and are captured. They are chained to a column with Shala and told the rules of the hunt. The trio is then turned loose by Zed, to be hunted as game; he warns them to stay away from the "Phantom Zone".

Shala sacrifices herself to save Tisa from Zed. Using a map, the remaining two find their way to the Phantom Zone, an ancient temple inhabited by zombie-like creatures. They find a cache of laser weapons, and return to the jungle to fight Zed, pursued by one of the creatures. Zed knocks Daria off of a bridge over a chasm to her apparent death; unbeknownst to him, she saves herself by grabbing hold of a vine. He returns with Tisa to his fortress where he attempts to rape her. Daria interrupts and fights him; the monster that was pursuing her shows up, mortally wounds Zed, and attacks the women. They manage to kill the creature and find a spaceship to escape the planet. Zed, dying from his injuries, initiates a self-destruct of his fortress but Daria and Tisa escape in time, and decide to explore the universe.

== Cast ==
- Elizabeth Kaitan (credited as Elizabeth Cayton) as Daria, a space prison escapee and impromptu leader.
- Cindy Beal as Tisa. A space prison escapee subordinate to Daria.
- Don Scribner as Zed, the hunter.
- Brinke Stevens as Shala, a castaway who becomes hunted with Daria and Tisa.
- Carl Horner as Rik, a castaway with a large hunting knife.
- Kirk Graves as Vak, a robot.
- Randoph Roehbling as Krel, a robot.
- Fred Tate as Alien Mutant, a hunchbacked alien with a laser rifle for an arm.

== Release ==
The film was given a limited release theatrically in the United States by the Charles Band funded Urban Classics in September 1987.

The film was released on DVD in the United States by Cult Video, a subsidiary of Full Moon Entertainment, in 1999.

== Reception ==
Steven Puchalski noted the film as "passable (and immediately forgettable) mind rot." Bryan Senn wrote: "Dixon's direction is right in line with the shoddy effects and plagiarized script." Cayton and Beal's performances were described as exhibiting "passive plasticity", while Scribner's portrayal was deemed unconvincing, although it was noted to be significantly superior to that of the lead actresses. Home Cinema Choice concluded: "It doesn't manage to live up to its title, but there's still some fun to be had with this vintage slice of '80s exploitation cinema." Starburst said that performance-wise the film was "mixed" but the production values were impressive despite the limited budget.

== Controversy ==
The movie is a mix of action, drama, and comedy, and features partial female nudity, restraint, simulated sex, and mild violence. The film is intended to be a mainstream B-movie, despite its low production budget. However, the scene depicting Daria and Rik engaged in passionate lovemaking, with some female nudity (although no genitalia is shown) as part of the character development process prior to Rik's disappearance is intentionally done for comedic value in the same style as some soft porn scenes in other movies.

Slave Girls from Beyond Infinity was specifically criticized on the floor of the United States Senate by Jesse Helms (R-North Carolina) in 1992. Senator Helms cited a case in which some of his constituents had accidentally stumbled onto the movie while flipping through cable channels as justification for amendments to the Cable Act of 1992. Helms wanted to force cable operators to block "indecent" programming unless customers specifically asked for it in writing. The amendment was struck down by a US Federal Court in 1993 and the decision was upheld by the United States Supreme Court in 1996.
