= Chuck Jeffreys =

American actor

- Born: William Charles Jeffreys III; July 23, 1958 (age 67); Washington, D.C., U.S.
- Occupations: Actor; stuntman

William Charles Jeffreys III (born July 23, 1958) is an American actor, martial artist, stuntman, and fight choreographer.

== Early life ==
Jeffreys is originally from Washington, D.C.. He grew up in Hillcrest Heights, Maryland. He has been studying martial arts since around the age of 7 or 8. As a martial artist, he has studied Northern Shaolin Kung Fu and wushu under Sifu Willy Lin.

== Career ==
=== Actor ===
As an actor he has appeared in more than 24 films and television shows. He had supporting roles in Aftershock, Lockdown, Superfights and The Substitute 2: School's Out and co-starred in the 1997 film Bloodmoon. He is also the Fire Warlord in the Digital Pictures full-motion video action game Supreme Warrior.

Some of the martial arts films he has acted in include Hawkeye and Fight to Win. Both films also starred George Chung. He co-starred as Detective Chuck Baker in the film Bloodmoon that starred Darren Shahlavi. He had a major supporting role in the film Zong heng tian xia aka Honor and Glory which starred Cynthia Rothrock, which was released in 1993.

It has been said that he has a resemblance to Eddie Murphy. In the late 1980s he joined the cast of the WJLA Saturday show "Pick Up The Beat". He also filled in for Erik King as the shows host.

=== Stunts ===
From the late 1980s to 2016 he had worked on more than 60 films and television shows in various stunt roles. He was the fight coordinator for the 2015 television series The Player.

As a choreographer he has worked with Jessica Biel, Willem Dafoe, Tobey Maguire, Ryan Reynolds and Wesley Snipes. He did stunt work for the film 12 Monkeys which was released in 1995. Jeffreys was also responsible for getting Darren Shahlavi the stunt work on Blade: Trinity. Jeffreys did work on 21 Jump Street, released in 2012. He was one of the stunt coordinators for the 2015 films Black Mass, which was a film about the career of infamous American mobster James "Whitey" Bulger, and Miles Ahead, which was a film about jazz musician Miles Davis.

== Partial filmography ==
Actor
Title	Role	Director	Year	Notes #
Dangerous Passages aka Fight to Win	Michael	Leo Fong	1987	
Hawkeye	Charles Wilson	George Chung	1988	
Blood Street	'Bones'	Leo Fong	1988	
Aftershock	Danny Girrard	Frank Harris	1990	
Lockdown	Mac Maguire	Frank Harris	1992	
Flodder in Amerika!	Annoying Negro #2	Dick Maas	1992	
Zong heng tian xia	Jake Armstrong	Godfrey Ho	1993	
Rage	'I-Ron'	Anthony Maharaj	1994	
The Addiction	Bartender	Abel Ferrara	1995	
12 Monkeys	Thug #2	Terry Gilliam	1995	
The Ultimate Warrior	Fire Warlord	Guy Norris	1995	
