= Tom Dugan (actor, born 1961) =

American actor (born 1961)

- Born: New Jersey, U.S.
- Occupations: Theater actor, Film actor, Television actor
- Spouse: Amy Opell

Tom Dugan (born 1961) is an American theater, film and television actor who appeared in nearly 50 films and television series since 1986.

== Life and career ==
Tom Dugan grew up in Winfield Township, New Jersey and studied theater at Montclair State University. Dugan has been professionally acting in Los Angeles for over 25 years and is the 2011 Los Angeles Drama Critics Circle Award-Winner for Best Solo Performance for his work as Simon Wiesenthal in Wiesenthal.

An LA Times Critics' Pick for 2010, Tom Dugan wrote and starred in one-man historical plays Robert E. Lee - Shades of Gray and Wiesenthal, and wrote and directed Frederick Douglass - In the Shadow of Slavery and The Ghosts of Mary Lincoln. Dugan often plays in the area of one-person shows, and has had as many as five shows in production simultaneously. His regional theatre work includes leading roles in The Man Who Came to Dinner, Misery, Amadeus and The Voice of the Prairie and Tevye in New York. He has also starred in national tours of Oscar to Oscar and On Golden Pond with Jack Klugman, along with national tours of his own plays including Robert E. Lee – Shades of Gray and Wiesenthal. Dugan is a member of the Colony Theatre in Los Angeles, CA, Theatre 40 in Beverly Hills, CA, Theatrical Arts International, SAG/AFTRA, and Actors Equity. Accolades for Dugan include three nominations for the 2011 Los Angeles Ovation Awards, for his work in Wiesenthal, and the 2003 Inland Theater League Best Actor Award.

In films, he appeared as Chamberlain from the horror action film Hellraiser: Bloodline (1996), the Surgeon from The Cutting Edge: Going for the Gold (2006) film and Orange Country Man in Pro-Choice (2006). He also appeared as an arms dealer in P.U.N.K.S. (1999), and an operator in The Puppet Masters (1994). Dugan's television and film credits include Bones, Friends, Curb Your Enthusiasm, The Practice, Even Stevens, Chicago Hope, Santa Barbara, Sunset Beach, Just Shoot Me!, Kindergarten Cop and Dave.

== Filmography ==
- 1986 Odd Jobs as Lester
- 1986 Thunder Run as Wolf
- 1988 Perfect Victims as Brandon Poole
- 1988 The Naked Gun: From the Files of Police Squad! as Drug Dealer #2
- 1989 Brothers in Arms as William
- 1989 Bill & Ted's Excellent Adventure as Neanderthal #2
- 1989 Ghostbusters II as Restaurant Cop #1
- 1989 Nightwish as Wendall
- 1990 Lisa as Mr. Adams
- 1990 Marked for Death as Paco
- 1990 Kindergarten Cop as Crisp's Lawyer
- 1992 Twogether as Paul
- 1993 Dave as Jerry
- 1993 Beethoven's 2nd as Hot Dog Vendor
- 1994 Dangerous Touch as Freddie
- 1994 Menendez: A Killing in Beverly Hills (TV) as Lyle's Jury: Juror #4
- 1994 A Friend to Die For (TV) as Public Defender
- 1994 The Puppet Masters as Operator #1
- 1994 Junior as Lobster Man
- 1995 Stuart Saves His Family as Ajax Spokesman
- 1995 Leprechaun 3 as Art
- 1996 If Looks Could Kill (TV) as Lance Herflin
- 1996 Hellraiser: Bloodline as Chamberlain
- 1996 White Cargo as Robert
- 1996 Galgameth as William
- 1998 I've Been Waiting for You (TV) as Ted Rankin
- 1999 P.U.N.K.S. as Shareholder
- 2000 The Trial of Old Drum (TV)
- 2001 Race to Space as Reporter #2
- 2003 The Even Stevens Movie (TV) as Keith
- 2006 The Cutting Edge: Going for the Gold as Surgeon
- 2006 Pro-Choice as Orange Country Man
