= Last Chance for Animals =

Nonprofit organization

- Founded: 1984; 42 years ago
- Founder: Chris DeRose
- Type: 501(c)(3)
- Purpose: Animal rights
- Location: Los Angeles, California
- Revenue: $1,062,056 (2010)
- Website: www.lcanimal.org

Last Chance for Animals (LCA) is an international non-profit organization that advocates for animal rights. It is known for its documentary, Dealing Dogs, and for its investigations against the use of animals for testing purposes.

== Formation ==
The organization was founded in 1984 by Hollywood actor Chris DeRose as a group to oppose vivisection. In the organization's early years, DeRose led teams of activists employing non-violent strategies modeled after social movements led by such leaders as Mahatma Gandhi and Martin Luther King Jr.

== Mission ==
Last Chance for Animals seeks to eliminate animal exploitation through direct action, education, investigations, legislation, and media attention. LCA opposes the use of animals in food and clothing production, scientific experimentation, and entertainment. LCA also promotes a cruelty-free lifestyle and the ascription of rights to non-human beings. They support veganism and oppose animal testing.

As their budget and staff increased from 2000 and on, LCA has expanded its focus beyond vivisection. LCA also now focuses on pet theft, the fur trade, and circuses, and it has also focused on animal use in other forms of entertainment, as well as on large-scale "factory" farming issues. The organization also provides money and support for the animal rescue mission occurring in areas heavily affected by the 2011 tsunami in Japan.

== Investigations ==
Their special investigations unit performs stings, investigations, and under-cover camera work. In 2012, in an effort to lure alleged kitten torturer (and convicted murderer of Lin Jun) Luka Magnotta into contacting them, they posted a "fan video" of Magnotta online. At the time, Magnotta was in hiding in Europe with law enforcement in Canada and Europe searching for him. According to LCA, they were in contact "with several individuals who may have been Luka, or close associates of Luka" and "that information was turned over to Law Enforcement."

== Legal rulings ==
In 2007, their investigation into cockfighting in Arkansas led to the nation's biggest cockfighting ring bust.

== See also ==
- List of animal rights groups
