= Linda DeScenna =

American set decorator (born 1949)

- Born: November 14, 1949 (age 76); Warren, Ohio, United States
- Occupations: Set decorator and production designer
- Years active: 1979–2008
- Spouse: John Mark Robinson

Linda DeScenna (born November 14, 1949) is an American set decorator and production designer. She has been nominated for five Academy Awards in the category Best Art Direction.

== Career ==
When hired to work on the 1979 film Star Trek: The Motion Picture, one of DeScenna's tasks was to redesign the chairs seen on the bridge of the USS Enterprise. She later credited Mike Huntoon with ensuring that her designs for the film were carried out.

During the production of the 1982 film Blade Runner, DeScenna and her team were tasked with the creation of numerous props ranging from magazine covers, to store signs in order to flesh out the vision of director Ridley Scott.

When she was recruited for the Robin Williams film Patch Adams in 1998, DeScenna was required to build one of the three main shooting locations from scratch. She oversaw the construction of a 20,000 square feet (1,900 m^{2}) hospital set on Treasure Island near San Francisco. She worked on Galaxy Quest, which was released the following year. For 2007's Evan Almighty, she worked alongside others on the Ark. She built the bottom level of the Ark from steel-reinforced wood, and the bow from styrofoam.

=== Awards ===
DeScenna's set decorating work has been nominated for five Academy Awards as part of the Best Art Direction. Her first was for Star Trek: The Motion Picture alongside Harold Michelson, Joe Jennings, Leon Harris and John Vallone. She was nominated alongside Lawrence G. Paull and David Snyder for their work on Blade Runner at the 55th Academy Awards. She was nominated once more at the 58th Academy Awards for set decorating on The Color Purple, and twice more for Rain Man and Toys respectively.

== Personal life ==
Around 1974, DeScenna moved to Los Angeles with her then-boyfriend, John Zabrucky. They ended their relationship after the move, but remained friends.

In 2017, DeScenna was married to John Mark Robinson.
