= Front Row Channel =

Global digital network

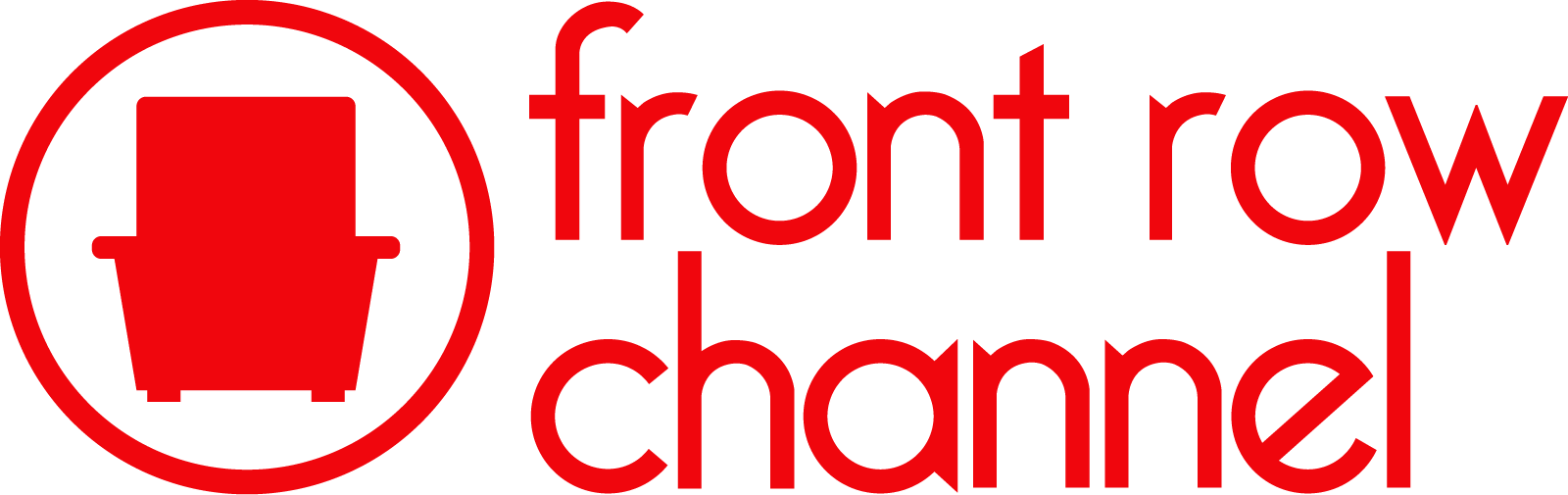
- Country: United States
- Broadcast area: United States; India; Indonesia; Philippines

Programming
- Language: English
- Picture format: 1080p (HDTV)

Ownership
- Owner: Jungo TV; GMA Network, Inc. (Philippines; under joint venture by Solar Entertainment Corporation)
- Sister channels: Combat Go; Hallypop; Kick Flix; ES24

History
- Launched: 2018 (United States, Indonesia); April 1, 2020 (Philippines)
- Closed: September 20, 2024 (Philippines)

Availability

Streaming media
- Stirr (United States): Internet Protocol television
- Roku: Internet Protocol television
- OONA TV (Indonesia): Internet Protocol television

Front Row Channel is a global digital live music channel owned by Jungo TV, based in the United States. The channel specializes in broadcasts of live concerts with featured performances from the world's top musical acts.

== International distribution ==
In addition to the United States, the channel is also available through distribution in India (via IMCL), Indonesia (via OONA TV), and the Philippines (via Solar Entertainment Corporation).
