= Fight to Win (film) =

- Film poster
- Directed by: Leo Fong
- Screenplay by: James Belmessieri; George Chung
- Story by: George Chung
- Produced by: George Chung; Jerry Brassfield; Sunny Lim
- Starring: George Chung; Cynthia Rothrock; Richard Norton; Troy Donahue; Hidy Ochiai; Bill Wallace; Juan Chapa; Chuck Jeffreys
- Cinematography: Gene Evans; Frank Harris
- Edited by: Victor Alexander; Peter Jones; The Cactus Man
- Music by: Steve Czarnecki; Lewis Elliot; Chuck Jeffreys; Tony Lindsay
- Production company: Sunny Films
- Release date: 1987
- Running time: 77 minutes
- Country: United States
- Language: English

Fight to Win (also known as Eyes of the Dragon and Dangerous Passages) is a 1987 martial arts comedy film directed by Leo Fong and starring Cynthia Rothrock, George Chung, Richard Norton and Chuck Jeffreys. In the film, martial artist Ryan Kim has an upcoming fight and gets training from a martial arts master, Sensei Lauren.

== Plot ==
In a martial arts tournament the statues of three Chinese gods are given to the three winners, Armstrong, Kim and Sakiyama.

20 years later, Sakiyama is the sensei of Kim's son Ryan and Armstrong wants to get his hands on their two statues. Sakiyama falls ill, so he can not train Ryan any more, so Ryan loses the match for his statue against Armstrong's fighter. They arrange a final fight in two months, where the winner will get all statues.

Sakiyama's former pupil Lauren arrives to train Ryan from then on, but he is biased because Lauren is a woman. She defeats him, he gives in and ultimately wins against Armstrong's fighter. But then Armstrong's men show up, armed with guns, and he keeps all the statues.

Sakiyama's fighters then have to fight Armstrong's crime syndicate at their mansion to get the statues they won.

== Cast ==
- George Chung
- Cynthia Rothrock
- Richard Norton
- Troy Donahue
- Hidy Ochiai
- Bill Wallace
- Juan Chapa
- Chuck Jeffreys

== Background ==
The film was shot on location in Northern California.
