= The San Pedro Beach Bums =

1977 American comedy television series

- Title card.
- Genre: Situation comedy
- Starring: Christopher Murney; Stuart Pankin; John Mark Robinson; Darryl McCullough; Jeff Druce; Chris DeRose; Louise Hoven; Susan Mullen; Lisa Reeves; Kristoff St. John; Nancy Morgan
- Theme music composer: Mark Snow
- Country of origin: United States
- Original language: English
- No. of seasons: 1
- No. of episodes: 11 (1 unaired) plus pilot

Production
- Executive producers: Aaron Spelling; Douglas S. Cramer
- Producer: E. Duke Vincent (pilot)
- Running time: 60 minutes
- Production company: Aaron Spelling Productions

Original release
- Network: ABC
- Release: September 19 – December 19, 1977

The cast.

Title card for The San Pedro Bums, pilot for The San Pedro Beach Bums.

The San Pedro Beach Bums is a 1977 American sitcom that aired on ABC. It is about five carefree young men living together on a houseboat in San Pedro, California. The 90-minute pilot, titled The San Pedro Bums, originally aired on May 13, 1977. The main series aired from September 19 to December 19, 1977.

== Cast ==
- Christopher Murney as Buddy Binder
- Stuart Pankin as Anthony "Stuf" Danelli
- John Mark Robinson as Ed "Dancer" McClory
- Darryl McCullough as Moose Maslosky
- Jeff Druce as Boychick (pilot only)
- Chris DeRose as Boychick (weekly series)
- Louise Hoven as Louise
- Susan Mullen as Suzi Camelli
- Lisa Reeves as Margie
- Kristoff St. John as Ralphie
- Nancy Morgan as Julie

== Synopsis ==
Five young men, who had been friends since high school, discover an abandoned boat in the harbor at San Pedro, California. Taking possession of the boat, they rename it Our Boat and decide to live on it as a houseboat.

Buddy is the streetwise leader of the group. Dancer is the shy, fidgety friend of the group. Stu is an intellectual and also a compulsive eater. Moose is large but simple-minded and gentle. Boychick is a ladies man.

Calling themselves The Bums, the group goes on adventures as they live on Our Boat.

== Production ==
On May 13, 1977, ABC broadcast the pilot for The San Pedro Beach Bums, a 90-minute TV-movie titled The San Pedro Bums, which told the story of the "Bums" finding Our Boat and moving onto it. Although a similar premise had not worked in the unsuccessful comedy-drama It's a Man's World in 1962–1963, ABC believed in the concept, and it picked up the show as a weekly one-hour sitcom for its fall 1977 schedule. Concerned that the use of the word "bums" in the pilot's title could be construed as negative and drive some viewers away unless softened by a more lighthearted connotation, ABC changed the name of the weekly series to The San Pedro Beach Bums. A cast change also took place, with Jeff Druce, who played Boychick in the pilot, replaced by Christopher DeRose in the weekly series.

To boost viewership for The San Pedro Beach Bums, ABC scheduled it as the lead-in for the 1977 season of the popular ABC Monday Night Football. To garner extra attention for the show's premiere in September 1977, the women who starred as the "Angels" in the hit ABC program Charlie's Angels – Kate Jackson, Jaclyn Smith, and Cheryl Ladd – guest-starred as themselves in the episode.

Aaron Spelling and Douglas S. Cramer were the show's executive producers. E. Duke Vincent wrote and produced the pilot, and Barry Shear directed it. Episode directors were Jack Arnold, Allen Baron, Earl Bellamy, Gene Nelson, George Tyne, and Don Weis. Episode writers included Earl Barret, William Raynor, and Myles Wilder.

== Broadcast history ==
The San Pedro Beach Bums aired at 8:00 p.m. on Mondays throughout its run. ABC broadcast new episodes weekly from September 19 to October 31, 1977, followed by one in November 1977 and two in December 1977. Despite heavy promotion, highly favorable scheduling, and cross-marketing with more successful ABC shows, The San Pedro Beach Bums never gained much of an audience, and ABC cancelled the show after the broadcast of its 10th episode on December 19, 1977. An 11th episode was made, but did not air.

== Episodes ==
=== Pilot (1977) ===
Title	Directed by	Written by	Original release date
"The San Pedro Bums"	Allen Baron and Barry Shear	E. Duke Vincent	May 13, 1977
Five carefree young men who have been friends since high school find a derelict boat in the harbor at San Pedro, California. They name it Our Boat and decide to move aboard and use it both as their houseboat and as the headquarters for a fishing business. Before long, a gang of toughs robs one of their friends, and they set about ridding the waterfront of the miscreants. This episode aired as a 90-minute television movie. For the weekly series, the name was changed from The San Pedro Bums to The San Pedro Beach Bums. Jeff Druce, who played Boychick in the pilot, was replaced by Christopher DeRose in the weekly series.

=== Season 1 (1977) ===
No.	Title	Directed by	Written by	Original release date
1	"The Angels and the Bums"	Unknown	Simon Muntner	September 19, 1977
Alternative title: "Beauty and the Bums." The Bums try to recruit the women of Charlie's Angels to judge the Miss Harbor Beauty Contest. The "Angels" – Kate Jackson, Jaclyn Smith, and Cheryl Ladd – guest-star as themselves, along with Herb Edelman and Jenny Sherman.
2	"The Shortest Yard"	Unknown	Ron Friedman	September 26, 1977
The Bums decide to teach a lesson in fair play to a football team that specializes in cheating and cheap shots. Frank Gifford guest-stars as himself. Denny Evans, Martin Kove, Richard X. Slattery, Roger Callard, and Tim Rossovich also guest-star.
3	"The Magnificent Moose"	Unknown	William Raynor and Myles Wilder	October 3, 1977
A bully tries to impress Marge by belittling Moose. Joseph Burke and Ian Tanza guest-star.
4	"Godfathers Five"	Unknown	William Raynor and Myles Wilder	October 10, 1977
Dancer gets a job as an assistant to a private investigator, and his first assignment is to protect a baby that is in danger of being kidnapped. Meanwhile, two confidence men convince Stuf that he has a future as a movie star and swindle him out of $2,000 for a phony screen test. Cliff Norton, Dee Wallace Stone, Joe Bennett, and Theodore Bikel guest-star.
5	"The Winner's Circle"	Unknown	Earl Barret	October 17, 1977
Marge's uncle is in debt and asks the Bums to hide a Thoroughbred race horse he owns so it cannot be seized before he pays his creditors. Bob Corso, Dick Balduzzi, Parley Baer, Rachel Longaker, and Roger C. Carmel guest-star.
6	"The Bums vs. the Reds"	Unknown	Simon Muntner	October 24, 1977
After a lovelorn Soviet sailor jumps ship in San Pedro, the Bums try to help him make a touring professional tennis player his fiancée. Allan Rich, Elya Baskin, Larry Hankin, and Pavla Ustinov guest-star.
7	"Sweepstakes Bums"	Unknown	Ben Starr	October 31, 1977
The Bums search frantically for a winning lottery ticket worth $250,000 that they have misplaced. Arlene Golonka, Keene Curtis, Paulene Myers, and Regis Philbin guest-star.
8	"A Bum Thanksgiving"	Unknown	Simon Muntner	November 21, 1977
The Bums help an elderly homeless woman conceal her poverty and put on a Thanksgiving dinner to impress her visiting son. David Knapp guest-stars.
9	"Love Boat Bums: Bums Take a Cruise"	Unknown	Earl Barret	December 12, 1977
The Bums find adventure on a cruise in an episode that cross-markets with the hit ABC series The Love Boat. Dennis Robertson, Jane Zachary, and Lyle Waggoner guest-star.
10	"Lifting is My Life"	Unknown	William Raynor and Myles Wilder	December 19, 1977
Moose is fired after a beer keg rolls off his truck, explodes, and sprays beer all over the company president. The still relatively unknown Arnold Schwarzenegger guest-stars as "Muscleman". Eileen Barnett and Lloyd Bochner also guest-star.
11	"May the Best Bums Win"	N/A	Bruce Howard	Unaired
No summary available.
