= Call to Cosplay =

American reality television series

- Genre: Reality competition
- Starring: Keith Kawamura; Taylor Chung (DJ Wednesday)
- Judges: Brook Mahealani Lee; Marissa Floro; Johnny Junkers; Romeo Lacoste
- Country of origin: United States
- No. of seasons: 3
- No. of episodes: 20

Production
- Executive producers: George Chung; Miguel Santos
- Producer: Reko Moreno
- Editor: Pridhvi Sunain Zoro
- Running time: 22 minutes (excluding commercials)
- Production companies: AEUTV (Creators); Myx TV (Creators); Priswes Studios, USA (Post Production)

Original release
- Network: Myx TV (Parent) CONtv Amazon Video (Partners)
- Release: June 30, 2014 – May 10, 2016

Related
- Heroes of Cosplay

Call to Cosplay is an American reality television series on Asian American cable network Myx TV. It is a cosplay design competition show where contestants are tasked to create a costume based on a given theme and under time constraints. The show is the first wholly cosplay-based competition show in the United States. It premiered on June 30, 2014 and concluded on May 10, 2016.

== Episodes ==
No.	Title	Original release date
1	"Meet the Cosplayers"	June 30, 2014
The competitors are introduced. They discuss how they were inspired to cosplay and size up the competition.
2	"Zoe vs Yirico"	July 14, 2014
The two contestants are required to create a costume based on shonen manga in eight hours or less.
3	"Celeste Orchid vs Wednesday"	July 21, 2014
The two contestants must create a costume based on the magical girls theme.
4	"Kimba vs April"	July 28, 2014
The two contestants are tasked with creating costumes based on non-Japanese anime characters.
5	"Jayden vs Deanna"	August 4, 2014
Fantasy character is the theme the two cosplayers need to create for their costume.
6	"Finals"	August 11, 2014
The winner is revealed.
