= Pinoy Hits (Philippine TV channel) =

Filipino TV channel

- Sole logo used from January 16, 2023 to September 20, 2024
- Country: Philippines
- Broadcast area: Defunct
- Network: GMA Network
- Headquarters: GMA Network Center, EDSA corner Timog Avenue, Diliman, Quezon City, Philippines

Programming
- Languages: Filipino (main); English (secondary)
- Picture format: 16:9 720p SDTV

Ownership
- Owner: GMA Network Inc.
- Sister channels: GMA; GTV; Heart of Asia; Hallypop (closed); I Heart Movies

History
- Launched: January 2, 2023 (test broadcast); January 16, 2023 (official launch)
- Closed: September 20, 2024 (1 year, 8 months and 4 days)

Links
- Website: gmanetwork.com/entertainment/tv/pinoy_hits

Availability

Terrestrial
- Digital terrestrial television: Channel 7.06 (Mega Manila, Metro Cebu, Metro Naga and Ilocos Sur); Channel 11.06 (Iligan); Channel 10.06 (Metro Baguio, Dagupan and Tacloban City); Channel 12.06 (Batangas, Legazpi, Metro Cagayan de Oro and Bukidnon); Channel 13.06 (Metro Bacolod); Channel 6.06 (Metro Iloilo); Channel 5.06 (Roxas, Metro Davao and Mt. Province); Channel 8.06 (General Santos); Channel 9.06 (Zamboanga City)
- GMA Affordabox: Channel 6

Pinoy Hits (lit. 'filipino hits') was a Philippine digital television channel owned by GMA Network Inc. The channel was initially launched on January 2, 2023, under test broadcast, and officially launched on January 16, 2023. It ceased operations on September 20, 2024, alongside its sister channel Hallypop.

== Overview ==
GMA Network Inc. launched Pinoy Hits, a digital television channel designed to showcase a lineup of popular Filipino entertainment programs from its archives. The channel features a mix of classic and contemporary shows that appeal to a broad audience, bringing favorite content across genres to viewers through digital broadcast platforms. This initiative is part of GMA Network's expansion into digital multicast channels to provide greater access to its portfolio of programs.

Pinoy Hits ceased its broadcast operations on September 20, 2024, alongside its sister channel Hallypop, after operating for nearly two years since its launch on January 16, 2023.

== Final programming ==
Its programming consisting of classic television programs produced by GMA Entertainment, GMA Integrated News and GMA Public Affairs, also include simulcasts programming from GMA Network and GTV.
