= Prop design =

Theatrical occupation

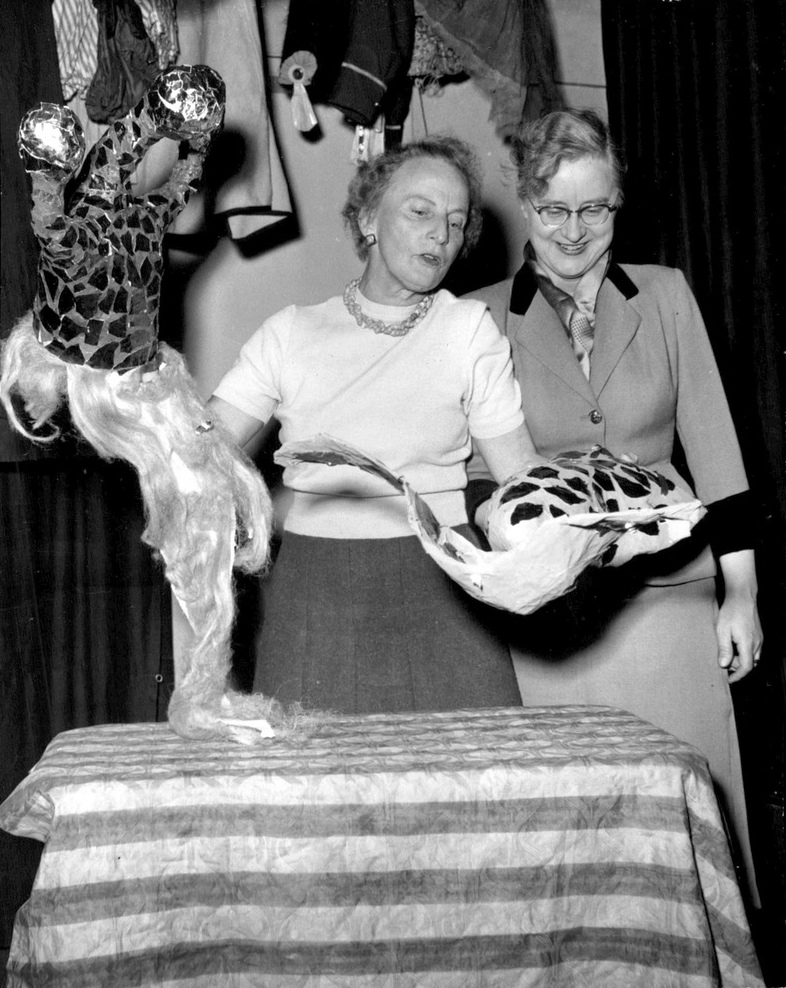
Librarian and writer Elsa Olenius and theatre director Karin Notini with props at a Swedish children's theatre

Property design, commonly known as prop design, is the design of props (theatrical property) for use in theatre, film, television, etc. Designers of props work in liaison with the costume designers, set designers and sound designers, under the direction of the art director or technical director.

The term is also associated with home or interior design.

== History ==
As with most theater, props originate from Ancient Greece where they would use urns and pebbles to represent voting ballots and ballot boxes during Aeschulyus' Eurmidine. This is possibly the most simplistic prop design as these props were either found objects in the case of the pebbles, or in the case of the urns terracotta or possibly bronze was used to craft them.

Shakespeare's plays had many props and in the case of Hamlet one of the props was a skull. Back then prop design was not advanced enough to build, or create a skull. This resulted in grave diggers being hired to go and find the needed skulls. If the prop did not require the digging of graves it is most likely hand crafted from wood, metal, stone, or sewn from cloth. Shakespeare's played used natural props such as trees, and moss banks that were brought on stage for A Midsummers Night Dream.
