= George Chung =

American actor

- Occupations: Businessman, producer, actor, director
- Known for: Martial arts champion

George Chung is an American actor, businessman, film director and TV show producer. He is also a five times world martial arts champion. He was the executive producer for the American reality television series, Call to Cosplay. He is also the executive producer of Bushido Battleground. Chung had the lead role in the 1988 film Hawkeye.

== Background ==
George Chung, a member of the Black Belt Hall of Fame was a 5-time world Karate champion. He is CEO and co-founder of Jungo TV.

Chung, along with Cynthia Rothrock ran a martial arts academy which was destroyed by fire in the 1980s. A new one was opened in Los Gatos, California, and was in operation in 1986. Both Chung and Rothrock are the co-authors of the book, Advanced Dynamic Kicks. Chung and Rothrock dated and lived together as a couple. By late 1989, their relationship was over.

As a Tae Kwon Do instructor, Chung has trained people such as former San Francisco 49ers football players Bill Romanowski, Charles Haley, Ronnie Lott, and Dwight Clark.

== Films ==
Chung's earliest film was Eyes of the Dragon, a Leo Fong directed film about a martial artist vying for a prized statue. It was also released as Fight to Win and Dangerous Passages. Chung directed and acted in the 1988 film Jungle Heat, a film about a man whose son is kidnapped. It also featured Leo Fong, Richard Norton, Cynthia Rothrock, and Stan Wertlieb. He played the lead character Alexander “Hawkeye” Hawkamoto in the film Hawkeye which was also released that year. His character teams up with Charles Wilson (played by Chuck Jeffreys), a fellow policeman to track down the killers of his friend. Along with Leo Fong, he co-directed the film Blood Street, a direct-to-video action film starring Fong in his reprised role as Joe Wong, a character from Low Blow. The film also starred Stack Pierce, Kim Paige, Chuck Jeffrys and Richard Norton. He played an Elvis impersonator in the 1992 film Honeymoon in Vegas.

== Television ==
In the late 90s, Chung was producing the children's series Adventures with Kanga Roddy. Chung was the executive producer for the series Call to Cosplay, which debuted on Myx TV.

== Films ==
Actor
Title	Role	Director	Year	Notes #
Dangerous Passages	Ryan Kim	Leo Fong	1988	
Jungle Heat		George Chung	1988	
Hawkeye	Alexander 'Hawkeye' Hawkamoto	Leo Fong; George Chung	1988	
Dragon Fight	Big Boss's Killer	Hin Sing 'Billy' Tang	1989	
Honeymoon in Vegas	Elvis impersonator	Andrew Bergman	1992	
KIndergarten Ninja	Master	Anthony Chan	1994	
Assignment Berlin	Yung Li	Tony Randel	1998	

Director, producer, writer
Title	Role	Year	Notes #
Jungle Heat	Director	1988	
Hawkeye	Director, writer	1988	
Blood Street	Director, writer	1988	
Kindergarten Ninja		1994	

Stunts and other
Title	Role	Director	Year	Notes #
Low Blow	Fight choreographer / Stunts	Leo Fong	1986	
Hawkeye	Editor	Leo Fong; George Chung	1988	
Blood Street	Stunt coordinator	Leo Fong; George Chung	1988	

== Television ==
Actor
Title	Episode	Role	Director	Year	Notes #
S.W.A.T.	The Chinese Connection	Han	Bruce Bilson	1976	

Director, producer, writer
Title	Role	Year	Notes #
Adventures with Kanga Roddy	Executive producer 39 episodes	1998 - 2000	
Call to Cosplay	Director 11 episodes Producer 11 episodes Writer 4 episodes	2015 to 2016; 2015 to 2016; 2015	
Movies So Good	Director 3 episodes Director 3 episodes Executive producer 3 episodes	2015	

== Publications ==
- George Chung, Cynthia Rothrock, Advanced Dynamic Kicks, Black Belt Communications, 1986, ISBN 978-0-89750-129-3
