= Chris DeRose =

American animal rights activist

- Born: June 28, 1948 (age 77); Brooklyn, New York, United States
- Years active: 1963–2010

Chris DeRose (born June 28, 1948) is an American animal rights activist, and recipient of the 1997 ‘Courage of Conscience’ International Peace Award and a former actor. He appeared as a regular on the ABC series San Pedro Beach Bums, General Hospital, Cagney and Lacey, CHiPs, The Rockford Files and Baretta. He also had lead or guest roles in 14 feature films. He was an on-camera reporter for the television shows Hard Copy and Inside Edition. Earlier, he worked as a police officer and as an investigator.

== Life and work ==
DeRose was born in Brooklyn, New York, and at age five, he went into an orphanage in New Jersey. He is the founder and president of Last Chance for Animals (LCA) and the author of the book In Your Face: From Actor to Animal Activist. DeRose has been arrested 12 times and jailed four times for opposing animal cruelty, including his participation in a break-in at the UCLA Brain Research Institute in 1988. DeRose was fired from General Hospital when he was sentenced to jail for the break-in.

DeRose appeared in the 2006 HBO documentary Dealing Dogs, along with an undercover animal rights activist known as "Pete" and other investigators of Last Chance for Animals. They uncovered mistreatment of animals on a large scale at Class B animal dealer C.C. Baird at Martin Creek Kennels in Arkansas. They were successful in closing the operation (which was the largest in the U.S.). Dealing Dogs profiles LCA's undercover investigation that was designed to expose Martin Creek Kennel's inhumane treatment of dogs and violations of the Animal Welfare Act. DeRose said he hoped Dealing Dogs would speed the passage of the Pet Safety and Protection Act, which, when passed, will put Class B dealers out of business.

DeRose arranged for two undercover Asian operatives to secretly videotape the butchering of a dog for food from Wisconsin Class B animal dealer Irving Stebane for the Hmong community. Felony charges were filed against the dealer, but in June 1993, Calumet County circuit judge Donald Poppy ruled the case constituted illegal entrapment and ordered the return of 143 dogs which had been seized. DeRose had arranged for all the dogs to be rescued.

DeRose received the 1997 Courage of Conscience International Peace Award for his commitment to saving animals and exposing animal abuse in entertainment, medical research and food production. In 2006, he became the Director of Animal Welfare for West Hollywood, California.

On March 4, 2008, DeRose posted a video response on YouTube calling out the American Marine David Motari, who threw a puppy off a cliff in Iraq. DeRose called the marines in the video cowards, and asked for an investigation. Motari was removed from the Marine Corps and received a non-judicial punishment. His accomplice, Sergeant Crismarvin Banez Encarnacion, received a non-judicial punishment as well. In 1990, in an interview for the Los Angeles times, DeRose revel eased his disregard for any potential human benefits of animal research, saying, “ “A life is a life,” declares Chris DeRose, head of the Los Angeles-based activist group, Last Chance for Animals. “If the death of one rat cured all diseases it wouldn’t make any difference to me. In the scheme of life we’re equal.”

== See also ==
- List of animal rights advocates
