= Jay Roberts Jr. =

American actor

James Jay Roberts (also known as Jay Roberts Jr.) is an American LAPD Captain and former actor, known for leading roles in films including White Phantom, Scent of Vengeance, and Aftershock.

Roberts attended San Diego State University and graduated from University of California, Los Angeles in 1984. In the late 1980s and early 1990s, Roberts pursued a career in film. In 1994, Roberts retired from the film industry and joined the Los Angeles Police Department (LAPD). His undercover assignments have included stints in Vice and Narcotics enforcement units. In 2004, Roberts was assigned as the OIC of the Department's "War Room", an anti-crime think tank. He wrote the War Room Handbook. In 2009, Roberts worked at the Topanga Gang Impact Team.

Roberts was the Foothill Area Gang Impact Team Officer and was the Adjutant to the First Assistant Chief and the Director of the Office of Operations for several years. In 2022, Captain Roberts was assigned Commanding Officer of the LAPD Rampart Division, named for the area it patrols.

== Filmography ==
Theatrical movies

- Scent of Vengeance a.k.a. El Aroma Del Copal (1996)
- Warlords 3000 a.k.a. Dark Vengeance (1993)
- Aftershock (1990)
- White Phantom (1987)
- Thin Ice
- On the Edge

TV appearances

- Homefront "Appleknocker to Wed Tomato-Hawker" (1993)
- Booker "Someone Stole Lucille" (1991)
- Murder She Wrote
