= Kamela Portuges =

American puppeteer

- Born: June 19, 1963; Manteca, California, U.S.
- Died: October 21, 2021 (aged 58)
- Other name: Kamela Portuges-Robbins
- Education: Humboldt State University
- Occupations: Puppeteer, designer, illustrator, sculptor
- Years active: 1989–2021
- Spouse: Kieron Robbins (married 2008–2021)
- Awards: Regional Emmy Awards

Kamela Portuges (June 19, 1963 – October 21, 2021), also known as Kamela Portuges-Robbins, was an American puppeteer, puppet designer, sculptor, animator, illustrator, writer, and director. Her work can be seen in many films including Being John Malkovich, James and the Giant Peach, Monkeybone, and Bicentennial Man. She started her career in puppetry in 1989 and was the co-founder of production company Images in Motion.

== Early life and education ==
Kamela Portuges was born in Manteca, California on June 19, 1963, to Paul and Barbara Portuges. Her family moved to Cottonwood in 1981.

Portuges attended Humboldt State University where she received a B.S in Business and Marketing and B.A in Theater. In 1987, She received a Masters of Art Theater and Business from Humboldt when she was just 22 years old.

== Career ==
Portuges' interest in puppetry first began when she watched puppet shows that aired on TV. One show that particularly inspired her was Pat McCormick's "Charlie and Humphreys Good Stuff Hour".

This interest was further explored when Portuges attended a puppet festival being held by the San Francisco Bay Area Puppeteer Guild in 1986. It was here she met future business partner Lee Armstrong, who had previously worked on Fraggle Rock, while she was holding a workshop at the festival. They both kept in touch and in 1989, Portuges and Armstrong formed the film and TV puppet production company Images In Motion.

Through Images in Motion, Portuges did many things such as designing puppets, doing 3-D animations and printing, sculpting various items, writing scripts, doing stage performances, and making radio control mechanisms. She had also been a part of the process for making commercials and doing editing and directing work on videos for clients made by Images in Motion.

One avenue of work that Portuges did at Images in Motion was sculpting figurines, dolls, and models. She worked on a line of celebrity dolls that included the cast of Hairspray, Rita Hayworth, Britney Spears, Pamela Anderson, and the Spice Girls. She had also worked for companies like LeapFrog, Crayola, Galoob, and had worked with Baby Einstein to make puppet productions for children.

One notable film that prominently features Portuges' work is the film Being John Malkovich. Portuges served as the film's head sculptor and a puppet designer. Portuges sculpted the marionettes that can be seen throughout the movie and trained John Malkovich on how to marionette his puppet. For the movie, Portuges had to sculpt 8 marionettes that included John Cusak, Catherine Keener, and Cameron Diaz, as well as a miniature puppet of John Malkovich and an eight-foot high marionette of Emily Dickinson. Director Spike Jonze hired Portuges to sculpt the marionettes after seeing the sculpting work she had done on her previous dolls.

Some of the other film and TV projects Portuges had worked on includes The Fly 2, Bicentennial Man, Psalty's Salvation Celebration, Little Big Awesome, James and the Giant Peach, MonkeyBone, Illusion of Life, Classic Stories for Children.

Portuges has also done much innovative work with 3-D printing, such as printing scale models of dinosaurs and various other 3-D work doing 3-D print services for Pixar and other Bay Area animation companies.

Portuges served as both a member and past president of the San Francisco Bay Area Puppeteers Guild.

Portuges also was a guest lecture at University of California Santa Cruz in the Theatre department from 2017 until 2021.

== Personal life ==
Kamela met Kieron Robbins in 2002 at a Santa Rosa Junior College art class and soon he was also working at Images in Motion. They later got married in 2008 and were together until her death in 2021.

Portuges also had a passion for children's books and wrote and illustrated and was a member of the Society of Children's Book Writers and Illustrators since 2018 and was the North Bay Regional Illustrator Coordinator for it.

== Awards ==
Kamela Portuges has received many awards for her work and works that she has been in collaboration with.

She has received 3 regional Emmy awards for her work, 3 Telly awards, and a Silver Smokey award. She received all three regional Emmy awards before she was 30 years old.

Her last award was a Telly award for a PSA she worked on through Images in Motion about the COVID-19 Pandemic.

== Filmography ==
=== Film and TV ===
- The Fly II (1989) – fabricator and finisher
- Quigley's Village (1989) – props
- Classic Stories for Children (1992) – puppeteer
- Psalty's Salvation Celebration (1992)- puppeteer and special effects
- James and the Giant Peach (1996) – sculptor
- Being John Malkovich (1999)- marionette designer and additional puppeteer
- Bicentennial Man (1999) – puppeteer
- Monkeybone (2001) – sculptor and puppeteer
- Pushing Dead (2016) – rod puppet (uncredited)
- Little Big Awesome (2018) – specialty props
- Illusion of Life (2019) – self

=== Video games ===
- Chip and Friends (2001) – Chip (Voice)
