= Samuel Klein (doctor) =

American physician

Samuel Klein is a doctor and nutritional specialist known for his research into weight loss and the causes of obesity. He is currently the Danforth Professor of Medicine and Nutritional Sciences at the School of Medicine at Washington University in St. Louis. His brother, Morton Klein, is the president of the Zionist Organization of America.
