= Party People (TV program) =

- Also known as: Park Jin-young's Party People
- Genre: Music; Talk show
- Starring: Park Jin-young
- Country of origin: South Korea
- Original language: Korean
- No. of seasons: 1
- No. of episodes: 12

Production
- Production location: South Korea
- Running time: 70 minutes

Original release
- Network: SBS
- Release: July 23 – October 21, 2017

Park Jin-young's Party People (Korean: 박진영의 파티피플) is a South Korean television program hosted by Park Jin-young. It airs on SBS on Saturday at 00:15 (KST) beginning 23 July 2017. It is mainly a music talk show with the atmosphere of a club, with alcoholic drinks.

== Episodes ==
Episode #	Air date	Guests	Ref.
1	July 23, 2017	Lee Hyori, Yum Jung-ah	
2	July 30, 2017	Apink, Heize	
3	August 6, 2017	Kim Tae-woo, Urban Zakapa	
4	August 13, 2017	Jung Yong-hwa, Blackpink	
5	August 20, 2017	Rose Motel, Baek A-yeon, Lee Hi	
6	August 27, 2017	Cultwo, Winner	
7	September 3, 2017	Yoo Yeon-seok, Oh Man-seok, Park Hae-mi	
8	September 17, 2017	Yoon Jong-shin, Henry, Sunny, Eddy Kim, Hareem, Jo Jung-chi	
9	September 24, 2017	Part 1: Kim Wan-sun, Bada, Sunmi; Part 2: Baek Ji-young, Gummy	
10	October 1, 2017	Part 1: Baek Ji-young, Gummy; Part 2: EXO (Except: Lay)	
11	October 14, 2017	Suzy	
12	October 21, 2017	B1A4, Mamamoo	

== Program ==
The program usually has a segment called Song Grabbing (뺏고송), where guests each choose a song and perform it in a different way from the original song.

Episode #	Guests	Song (Original singer)
1	Lee Hyo-ri	"Bad Girl Good Girl" (miss A)
1	Yum Jung-ah	"Miss Korea" (Lee Hyo-ri)
2	Apink	"Star" (Heize)
2	Heize	"No No No" (Apink)
3	Kim Tae-woo	"Breathe" (Lee Hi)
3	Urban Zakapa	"Moai" (Seo Taiji)
4	Jung Yong-hwa	Playing With Fire (Blackpink)
4	Blackpink	"Sure Thing" (Miguel)
5	Baek A-yeon	"The House You Live In" (Park Jin-young)
5	Lee Hi	"Come Back Home" (2NE1)
5	Rose Motel	"Night After Night" (Insooni)
6	Cultwo	Napal Baji (Psy)
6	Kang Seung-yoon	"Instinctively" (Yoon Jong-shin)
6	Winner	"Nobody" (Wonder Girls)
7	Yoo Yeon-seok	"Amazing You" (Han Dong-geun)
7	Oh Man-seok	"Becoming Dust" (Kim Kwang-seok)
7	Park Hae-mi	"Maria" (Kim Ah-joong)
8	Henry	"Like It" (Yoon Jong-shin)
9	Sunmi	"The Dance In Rhythm" (Kim Wan-sun)
9	Kim Wan-sun	"Full Moon" (Sunmi)
9	Bada	Girls' Generation (Lee Seung-chul)
9	Baek Ji-young	"I Don't Love You" (Urban Zakapa) "Pick Me" (Produce 101)
9	Gummy	"Ko Ko Bop" (EXO)
10	EXO	"Creep" (Radiohead) "Sunday Morning" (Maroon 5)
11	Suzy	"Like It" (Yoon Jong-shin) "Me" (Tamia)
12	Solar	"SexyBack" (Justin Timberlake)
12	Sandeul	"Love, The Common Word" (Kim Yeon-woo)
12	B1A4	"In The Same Place" (Girls On Top from Produce 101)

== Ratings ==
- In the ratings below, the highest rating for the show will be in red, and the lowest rating for the show will be in blue each year.
- NR denotes that the show did not rank in the top 20 daily programs on that date.

Episode #	Air date	Average audience share	
Episode #	Air date	AGB Nielsen	TNmS Ratings
1	July 23, 2017	3.3%	2.6%
2	July 30, 2017	2.2%	1.9%
3	August 6, 2017	1.6%	1.8%
4	August 13, 2017	2.1%	1.9%
5	August 20, 2017	2.5%	2.2%
6	August 27, 2017	2.6%	1.5%
7	September 3, 2017	1.9%	2.1%
8	September 16, 2017	2.3%	2.3%
9	September 23, 2017	2.7%	(NR)
10	September 30, 2017	3.0%	2.5%
11	October 14, 2017	3.8%	2.8%
12	October 21, 2017	1.6%	2.0%
