= Dealing Dogs (film) =

- Directed by: Tom Simon; Sarah Teale
- Country of origin: United States
- Original language: English

Production
- Producers: Tom Simon; Sarah Teale
- Editor: Geof Bartz
- Running time: 75 minutes

Original release
- Network: HBO
- Release: 2006

Dealing Dogs is a 2006 documentary film created by animal rights group Last Chance for Animals (LCA) about animal welfare in the United States, specifically about the marketing and sale of dogs to veterinarian schools and research labs.

The film was a 2007 Emmy Nominee for Best Cable Documentary and for Outstanding Investigative Journalism - Long Form, and won a 2007 Genesis Award for Outstanding Cable Documentary.

It is the final episode of HBO's America Undercover series.

== Synopsis ==
The film involves an undercover investigation by LCA's special investigations unit of Martin Creek Kennel in Williford, Arkansas, an alleged "Class B" dealer. A member of the unit known simply as "Pete" to maintain his cover, obtains a job at the kennel and documents deplorable conditions: dead dogs, dying dogs, starving dogs, dogs covered with wounds, dogs with missing ears. Partially as a result of the documentation, the kennel was permanently shut down by federal authorities.
