= Stirr =

American streaming television service

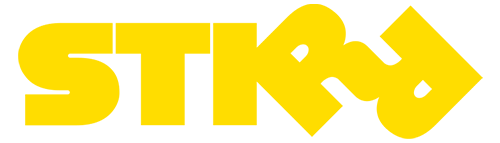
- Stirr logo
- Website type: streaming multi-channel platform
- Owners: Sinclair Broadcast Group (2019-2024); Thinking Media (2024-present)
- Website: stirr.com
- Commercial: Yes
- Launched: 16 January 2019; 7 years ago
- Current status: Active

Stirr is an American ad-supported video streaming service owned by Thinking Media. The streaming service is available on the web and via apps for iOS, Android devices and various streaming TV devices, including Amazon Fire TV, Roku, Apple TV, and Android TV. Stirr's slogan is, "the new free TV."

== History ==
Sinclair Broadcast Group began developing its technological infrastructure for the service before July 2017. Stirr would be formally announced in October 2018. Adam Ware would be Stirr's general manager. Sinclair hired Scott Ehrlich to head up the service and hired staff in Los Angeles and Seattle. Ehrlich was the Vice President of Emerging Platform Content at Sinclair. Prior to Stirr, Sinclair had also owned the Hummingbird streaming platform as well.

Stirr was launched on January 16, 2019 via a website and apps for iPhones, Android devices and various streaming TV devices, Amazon Fire TV, Apple TV and Roku. With the pending acquisition of the Fox Sports Networks, Sinclair indicated that they were looking at synergies between Stirr and those RSNs.

Sinclair Digital, Compulse (Sinclair's digital advertising unit) and Sinclair’s local stations would coordinate between them with ad revenue shared with content partners. Compulse was promoted through Sinclair's local stations.

=== Sale to Thinking Media ===
The last official press release referring to Stirr as an operating concern was in June 2022. Two years later, Stirr was sold to Thinking Media in January 2024. As a result, all remaining live streaming content owned by Sinclair (by that point including only the four remaining Sinclair-owned subchannel networks; as Sinclair had shut down Stirr City and cancelled its agreements with all other outside channels) was removed from the service.

== Channels ==
Stirr carries a variety of FAST channels among its current programming.

Under Sinclair ownership, Stirr originally drew on programming from Sinclair-owned TV stations and other live streaming channels, with some programming also available on demand. Although there are several US city regions to choose from when navigating the service, users did not have any geographic restrictions on what they could view. There were 20 national channels at launch on January 16, 2019 with expectations of having 50 by the end of the year. Stirr ultimately carried around 100 channels at its peak.

Stirr City was the service's primary streaming channel, which pulls content based on the location/station selected. When network programming ran on the local OTA channel, Stirr City would air alternate programming drawn from the other Stirr channels. WJLA-TV of Washington, D.C. was set as the default if no Sinclair news-carrying station is nearby. Second feeds could also be added to a local station's 'channel' during breaking news or severe weather events. Such was done for WBMA-LD's Stirr channel, where meteorologist James Spann's live coverage of tornadic events in the Birmingham, Alabama market and Alabama in general is popular nationwide.

Stirr featured a number of private label channels at launch, including Stirr Movies, Stirr Sports and Stirr Life. The service also carried other Sinclair-owned networks (such as Comet, Charge!, Stadium and Tennis Channel's streaming channel The T). Also, Stirr has TV series based channels. In addition, third-party networks carried on the service have included Buzzr and Circle (the latter owned by rival Gray Television), which Stirr stated was the most popular channel on the platform as of July 2019.
