= Carole Ita White =

American television and film actress

- Born: 1948 or 1949 (age 77–78)
- Other names: Carol Ita White; Carole White; Carol White
- Occupation: Actress
- Years active: 1972–present
- Father: Jesse White

Carole Ita White (born 1948 or 1949) is an American television and film actress.

== Early life ==
Carole Ita White's father is actor Jesse White. She grew up in Beverly Hills and attended Arizona State University.

== Career ==
Carole Ita White started appearing in episodic TV and small film roles in the early 1970s. Her first TV job was a TV movie titled Evil Roy Slade, starring John Astin, Mickey Rooney, and Milton Berle. The movie was written by producer and director Garry Marshall. Marshall cast her in a role on his series The Odd Couple.

She played Big Rosie Greenbaum on Laverne & Shirley. White landed the recurring role after an appearance as Raunchy Girl 1 in the first season episode "Dating Slump". Big Rosie was first seen as a nemesis to the title characters during the second season in the episode "Bachelor Mothers". She continued to make appearances as Big Rosie during the second and third seasons of the show. White did not appear again until the seventh season in an episode where Laverne and Shirley attend a high school reunion ("Class of '56").

White made guest starring appearances on such programs as Mary Hartman, Mary Hartman, The Love Boat, Beverly Hills, 90210, The Wayans Bros. and Profiler. She appeared on several game shows, including The $20,000 Pyramid.

White's film debut came in Up the Sandbox. She has continued to appear in small roles in films over the years, including Falling Down, The Witches of Eastwick, Grand Canyon, and The Fabulous Baker Boys. She appeared in the 2006 independent film Wannabe.

== Filmography ==
Year	Title	Role	Notes
1973	The Mary Tyler Moore Show	Girl At Party	1 episode
1973	Love, American Style	Alma	3 episodes (segment "Love and the Baby Derby" )
1975	S.W.A.T.	Augusta	1 episode
1975–1976	Starsky & Hutch	Bertha Zelinka	2 episodes
1976	Mary Hartman, Mary Hartman	Nurse Pudney	1 episode
1976	Helter Skelter	"Big Sal"	TV movie
1976	Baby Blue Marine	Girl On Bus	
1976	Pipe Dream	Rosey Rottencrotch	
1976–1982	Laverne & Shirley	Rosie Greenbaum	12 episodes
1978	The Love Boat	Penny Jacobs	1 episode
1980	Diff'rent Strokes	Valerie	1 episode
1982	The Concrete Jungle	"Cheeks"	
1983	Chained Heat	"Spider"	as Carol White
1983	Remington Steele	Terry Lowell Dannon	1 episode
1984	National Lampoon's Joy of Sex	Roberta	
1984	Savage Streets	Ms. Jenkins	
1984	Airwolf	Nurse	1 episode
1985	Trapper John, M.D.	Corky	1 episode
1985	Hellhole	Nurse Turner	
1986	The Naked Cage	"Trouble"	
1987	The Witches of Eastwick	The Cashier	
1987	Falcon Crest	Prostitute	1 episode
1988	The Wrong Guys	Ginger Grunski	as Carol Ita White
1989	The Fabulous Baker Boys	Bad Singer	
1990	Who's the Boss?	Receptionist	1 episode
1991	Life Goes On	Carol Matthews	1 episode
1991	Grand Canyon	Morning Nurse	
1992	The Jackie Thomas Show	Erin	1 episode
1994	The Unborn II	Marge Philips	
1994	Beverly Hills, 90210	Nurse Bethany	1 episode
1996	Bombshell	Carol	
1996	The Wayans Bros.	Doris	1 episode
1996	Ned and Stacey	Mary	1 episode
1997	Profiler	Unknown Role	1 episode
2005	Wannabe	Janice Peterson	
2006	Karla	Waitress	
