= Savage Streets =

1984 film by Danny Steinmann

- Original theatrical poster
- Directed by: Danny Steinmann
- Written by: Danny Steinmann; Norman Yonemoto
- Produced by: John Strong
- Starring: Linda Blair; Robert Dryer; Sal Landi; Johnny Venocur; Scott Mayer; John Vernon
- Cinematography: Stephen L. Posey
- Edited by: John A. O'Connor; Bruce Stubblefield
- Music by: John D'Andrea; Michael Lloyd
- Production company: Ginso Investment Corp.
- Distributed by: Motion Picture Marketing
- Release date: June 29, 1984 (Omaha, Nebraska)
- Running time: 93 minutes
- Country: United States
- Language: English
- Budget: $1 million – $2 million

Savage Streets is a 1984 American teen vigilante action thriller exploitation film directed by Danny Steinmann and starring Linda Blair, with Linnea Quigley and John Vernon appearing in supporting roles. It follows Los Angeles high school student Brenda who enacts revenge against the men in a gang who brutalize her deaf-mute younger sister Heather and murder her friend Francine Ramirez.

The project was originally developed by Billy Fine, who had previously directed Blair in Chained Heat (1983), with Tom DeSimone hired as the original director. Shortly into principal photography in early 1984, DeSimone was replaced by Steinmann. Filming took place in Los Angeles, and was completed in February 1984. The production was marked by financial difficulties, resulting in filming temporarily ceasing before producer John Strong became involved.

Following a successful appeal with the Motion Picture Association of America to revert its X rating, Savage Streets was first released regionally in the midwestern United States in the summer of 1984, and went on to become a major box-office hit in several South American countries, particularly Mexico and Argentina. The film was banned in Australia due to its graphic violence, and heavily edited for its original release in the United Kingdom by the British Board of Film Classification.

Savage Streets received largely unfavorable reviews from critics, who felt its depictions of rape and teenage violence were exploitative and crude, while Blair's lead performance was also harshly criticized. For her performance, Blair won the Golden Raspberry Award for Worst Actress. In the years since its initial release, it has become a cult film.

== Plot ==
Rebellious high-school student Brenda spends an evening on Hollywood Boulevard with her group of friends known as the Satins: Rachel, Stella, Francine Ramirez, Stevie and Maria. Accompanying them is Brenda's younger, innocent deaf-mute sister, Heather, of whom Brenda has grown extremely protective following their father's death. A reckless drug-dealing gang known as the Scars, which consists of Jake, Vince, Red and Fargo, nearly run the girls down on a street corner in Jake's convertible, causing Heather to fall to the ground. In retaliation, the girls steal the convertible before filling it with garbage and abandoning it on the street.

Jake exacts revenge by stalking the Satins at their high school, gaining the naïve Heather's trust before having his cohorts brutally beat and gang rape her. After school, the girls find Heather unconscious in the locker room, and she is hospitalized in a coma. Later that night, the girls visit a local disco where they encounter the Scars, and a fight breaks out after Fargo sexually harasses the pregnant Francine.

After Francine has a dress fitting for her impending wedding, she is stalked by the Scars, who chase her through an industrial section of the city before Jake murders her by throwing her off a viaduct spanning the Los Angeles River. The crime enrages Vince, the only member of the group who expresses remorse for their actions, and he cuts ties with the Scars. Later, Brenda encounters Vince apologizing to the comatose Heather in her hospital room. That night, Brenda confronts Vince at his house at knifepoint, where he admits the Scars have murdered Francine.

Seeking vengeance, an enraged Brenda visits a weapons store, where she purchases a crossbow and several bear traps. She ventures into a sparsely populated section of the city, where she locates the Scars near an abandoned textiles warehouse. Brenda taunts Fargo and Red, luring them into the warehouse, where she kills Fargo by shooting him through the neck with the crossbow, before dispatching Red by snapping a bear trap over his throat. Meanwhile, Jake kills Vince in a nearby alley by striking him with his car.

Jake finds Fargo and Red's corpses in the warehouse. He attempts to shoot Brenda with a pistol, but she incapacitates him by shooting him with the crossbow, and trapping him with a rope around his ankles which hangs him upside down. Brenda tortures the defenseless Jake by stabbing him with a hunting knife, but he manages to free himself and attacks her. Jake chases Brenda, cornering her inside a paint store. While the store's burglar alarm blares, Brenda douses Jake with paint before setting him on fire. Police arrive as the engulfed Jake stumbles out of the store and dies.

Some time later, Brenda, Heather, and the surviving members of the Satins visit Francine's grave. Brenda laments, "At least we made things right," to which Stevie responds, "No, Brenda, you made things right."

== Cast ==
- Linda Blair as Brenda
- Linnea Quigley as Heather
- Robert Dryer as Jake
- John Vernon as Principal Underwood
- Sal Landi as Fargo
- Johnny Venocur as Vince
- Scott Mayer as "Red"
- Debra Blee as Rachel
- Lisa Freeman as Francine Ramirez
- Marcia Karr as Stevie
- Luisa Leschin as Maria
- Ina Romeo as Stella
- Suzee Slater as Fadden's Girlfriend (uncredited)
- Rebecca Perle as Cindy Clark

== Production ==
=== Development ===
Tom DeSimone was originally hired to direct the film, which had been devised by director-screenwriter Billy Fine, who had previously directed Chained Heat (1983). The film was originally scheduled to go into production in June 1983, but it was postponed.

=== Casting ===
Cherie Currie was originally cast in the lead role of Brenda, but was replaced by Linda Blair. Blair, who had recently appeared in Fine's Chained Heat (1983), was hesitant to star as she did not want to make another exploitation film, describing Chained Heat as "not at all the film I set out to make." However, based on the box-office success of Chained Heat, as well as a profit participation agreement she had signed with Fine, Blair agreed to star. Linnea Quigley was cast as Heather, Blair's character's deaf-mute younger sister.

=== Filming ===
Principal photography occurred in Los Angeles on a budget of approximately $2 million, and was completed in February 1984. Tom DeSimone began as director with Fine producing. DeSimone was subsequently fired by Fine, after which Danny Steinmann, whose previous directorial credit was the slasher film The Unseen (1980), was hired as his replacement. Commenting on how he came to be involved with the film, Steinmann said:

I was working on a miniseries for Playboy Television starring Britt Ekland, when I got a call from a good friend of mine, Billy Fine. He was in big trouble. The picture that he was producing with Linda Blair was to begin literally tomorrow, problem was, he’d just fired the director. Would I take over? Playboy understood. I was free to go.

The shooting of Savage Streets was troubled: According to Blair and Steinmann, the production was shut down approximately two weeks after filming began, attributed to funding issues. Steinmann recounted that Fine clashed with him on the set, and alleged that Fine's original financing for the film had been sourced from mobsters. After Fine left the project, producer John Strong became involved and filming was able to resume. According to Steinmann, he and Strong began to clash on the set toward the end of the production, recounting: "He was employed to protect the investors. I had agreed with their decision that John would act on their behalf and could do nothing to counteract them. John would look in the camera on most shots, talk with the actors, and always question me about everything." The film's screenplay was reworked throughout the filming process, and Steinmann disagreed with Strong's insistence that the finale feature Blair's character exacting revenge alone, which Steinmann felt was unrealistic.

Actress Linnea Quigley reflected on her experiences making the film that Blair was "great to work with," but added, "However, my scenes involved being raped... It was a very hard film to make." Steinmann also praised Blair's work ethic on the film, commenting: "Linda Blair is a true professional. She worked hard and never complained."

== Release ==
Savage Streets opened in Omaha, Nebraska, on June 29, 1984, and subsequently screened in Detroit and several other southern Michigan cities on July 6, 1984, where it earned $400,000 during its opening week. It premiered in New York City on October 5, 1984.

=== Censorship ===
In the United States, the Motion Picture Association of America (MPAA) originally gave the film an X rating, which was successfully appealed by the producers on June 22, 1984. The central rape sequence remained truncated by the MPAA in the final cut, which was originally longer; according to Steinmann, "The girl’s torment was much more brutal. Each gang member took turns with her. It probably was overkill and what’s left is good enough." The film was banned in Australia due to its excessive violence, and its original 93-minute cut was rejected by the British Board of Film Classification, who authorized only a highly edited 80-minute version.

=== Box office ===
During the first week of its theatrical run in Michigan, beginning July 6, 1984, the film earned $400,000. It was a major commercial success in South America, ranking as one of the highest-earning films in Mexico for the first half of 1985, outperforming the American box-office hits Ghostbusters and Beverly Hills Cop. The film ranked number one at the box office in Argentina during the first two weeks of its release.

=== Critical response ===
Variety described the film as having "deliciously vulgar dialog and well-directed confrontation scenes," and likening Blair to "a tawdry, delightfully trashy sweater girl in a league with 1950s B-heroines such as Beverly Michaels, Juli Reding and Mamie Van Doren." TV Guide awarded the film one star and said of star Linda Blair: "This is Blair's best performance since The Exorcist (1973), but that's not saying much."

Stephen Holden of The New York Times derided the film, writing: "Savage Streets doesn't even have a rudimentary continuity between its scenes, and its performances are crude cartoons. The one quality it does exude is a kind of manic delight in its own awfulness." Desmond Ryan of The Philadelphia Inquirer disliked the film, calling it "the kind of crude nonsense that reminds us that Hollywood doesn't always resort to comedy in separating teenagers from their dollars," while The Roanoke Times's Chris Glidden declared it one of the worst films of the year. Critic Stephen Hunter also felt the film was poorly made, "low on brains and style and high on mean-spirited violence and undistinguished rock'n'roll." Lou Lumenick of the Hackensack Record commented that the film was unintentionally comical rather than thrilling, declaring: "Expect the worst."

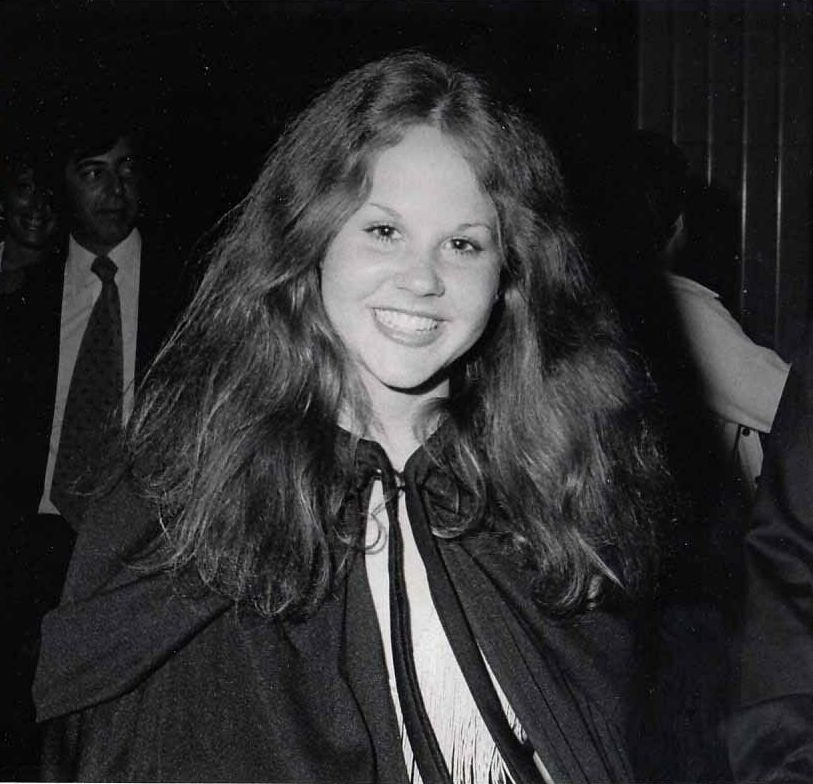
Linda Blair received criticism for her performance and won a Razzie Award for Worst Actress

Several critics felt the film was a major misstep for actress Linda Blair, including The Miami Herald's Bill Cosford, who wrote that "Blair has taken us deeper and deeper into the shadow world of bad film. Blair movies are the cinema equivalent of the life of Hobbes' natural man: Nasty, brutish and short." Critic Malcolm L. Johnson wrote in the Hartford Courant that director Steinmann "is intent on using the talentless, pudgy-faced Blair as the come-on for a badly crafted exploitation film. The carelessness is visible throughout." Scott Cain of The Atlanta Constitution felt Blair's performance was notably lackluster, describing it as "embarrassingly bad," insisting that she "remains the most resolutely unbelievable actress in movies today."

The film's depiction of rape was also a point of criticism, with F. X. Feeney of LA Weekly remarking that its central sexual assault scene with Linnea Quigley was mean-spirited and excessively graphic, feeling "the sense that by looking at all, I was encouraging the filmmakers' twisted delusion that the act was somehow meaningful or entertaining." Feeney ultimately described the film as a "cinematic herpes blister." Johnson also described the rape sequence negatively, deeming it "the most sickening [film] passage in memory." The Miami News's Jon Marlowe echoed a similar sentiment, feeling the film was sexist and exploitative, but conceded that it "still doesn't stop us from hanging onto the edge of our seats until the final frame rolls and the last arrow flies." In her book Men, Women, and Chainsaws (1993), film critic and scholar Carol J. Clover offered a different opinion, writing that the film, "despite being otherwise relentlessly invasive in its relationship to female bodies, manages to rein in its voyeuristic impulses during the rape proper."

In a retrospective review, Jacob Knight, writing for Birth.Movies.Death., described the film as "positively revolting," concluding: "Savage Streets is an angry motion picture, and will only appeal to those who enjoy unrepentant unpleasantness... [it] offers a reminder that, at one point during film history, you could wander into a flophouse and watch something you more than likely shouldn’t."

==== Accolades ====
Award	Category	Nominee(s)	Result	Ref.
Golden Raspberry Awards	Worst Actress	Linda Blair (also for Night Patrol and Savage Island)	Won	

=== Home media ===
Vestron Video released Savage Streets on VHS in July 1985. On September 23, 2008, it was released in a 2-disc set "Special Edition" by Bryanston Distributors/Motion Picture Marketing in association with BCI Eclipse/Navarre Corporation with bonus features produced by Red Shirt Productions and Code Red. Scorpion Releasing issued a new DVD edition in 2012. In 2021, Kino Lorber released a Blu-ray edition of the film.

=== Distribution lawsuit ===
In 2007, the film's distributor, Motion Picture Marketing, sold the rights to the film to Bryanston Film Distributors. In June 2013, Bryanston became aware that The Cinefamily had been advertising and selling tickets to late-night screenings of the film, which Bryanston had not authorized. Bryanston proceeded to sue The Cinefamily, alleging that The Cinefamily had infringed on the film's copyright.

== Soundtrack ==
The soundtrack featuring the theme song "Justice for One" performed by John Farnham was never officially released to the public but may be found on rare promos which were sent to DJs at the time of the picture's release. Some LP releases were put out by the Curb Records

== Legacy ==
In the years since its initial release, Savage Streets has developed a cult following and been exhibited at various horror and exploitation film revival screenings, including at the New Beverly Cinema in 2008 and the American Cinematheque in 2016.

Film scholar Alexandra Heller-Nicholas cites Savage Streets alongside Ms .45 (1981) and Positive I.D. (1987) as one of a series of rape and revenge films produced in the 1980s that featured "vampish and overtly sexualized" models of agency for abused women. Writer Art Tavana likens the film to a feminist version of Michael Winner's Death Wish (1974).

== Sources ==
- Budnik, Dan (2017). '80s Action Movies on the Cheap: 284 Low Budget, High Impact Pictures. Jefferson, North Carolina: McFarland. ISBN 978-0-786-49741-6.
- Clover, Carol J. (1993). Men, Women, and Chain Saws: Gender in the Modern Horror Film. Princeton, New Jersey: Princeton University Press. ISBN 978-0-691-00620-8.
- Craddock, James (2000). Video Hounds Golden Movie Retrievee: The Complete Guide to Movies on Videocassette, DVD and Laserdisc. Detroit, Michigan: Visible Ink Press. ISBN 978-1-578-59120-6.
- Heller-Nicholas, Alexandra (2021) [2011]. Rape-Revenge Films: A Critical Study (Second ed.). Jefferson, North Carolina: McFarland. ISBN 978-1-476-64490-5.
- Kermode, Mark (2010). It's Only a Movie: Reel Life Adventures of a Film Obsessive. London, England: Arrow Books. ISBN 978-1-409-09916-1.
- Paul, Louis (2014). Tales from the Cult Film Trenches: Interviews with 36 Actors from Horror, Science Fiction and Exploitation Cinema. Jefferson, North Carolina: McFarland. ISBN 978-0-786-48402-7.
- Tavana, Art (2021). Goodbye, Guns N' Roses: The Crime, Beauty, and Amplified Chaos of America's Most Polarizing Band. Toronto, Ontario: ECW Press. ISBN 978-1-773-05726-2.
