= Possessed by the Night =

- Film Poster
- Directed by: Fred Olen Ray
- Screenplay by: Mark Thomas McGee
- Story by: Fred Olen Ray
- Produced by: Alan Amiel
- Starring: Shannon Tweed; Ted Prior; Sandahl Bergman; Chad McQueen; Frank Sivero
- Cinematography: Gary Graver
- Edited by: Steven Nielson; Fima Noveck
- Music by: Chuck Cirino
- Distributed by: MDP Worldwide
- Release date: 1994
- Running time: 84 minutes
- Country: United States
- Language: English

Possessed by the Night is a 1994 erotic thriller directed by Fred Olen Ray, who also co-wrote and had a brief appearance in the film. It also stars Shannon Tweed.

== Synopsis ==
When a horror writer named Howard Hansen buys an oversized jar containing a strange-looking pickled monster from a tiny shop in Chinatown, he quickly falls under its supernatural influence. Not only can he churn out manuscript pages like never before, he also becomes more sexually aggressive. His unusual change begins to trouble his wife, Peggy, particularly after the arrival of his new sexy blonde live-in secretary, Carol McKay.

What Howard and Peggy don't know is that Carol is conspiring with her partner Murray Dunlap, Howard's greedy agent, to steal his manuscript. Carol soon becomes possessed by the thing in the jar as well, playing sexual violent games with Howard and Peggy, terrorizing Peggy at every turn, and ultimately turning on Murray, leading to a hyper-violent climax which has nearly everyone blasting away at their co-conspirator with automatic weaponry.

== Cast ==
- Shannon Tweed as Carol McKay
- Ted Prior as Howard Hansen
- Sandahl Bergman as Peggy Hansen
- Chad McQueen as Gus
- Frank Sivero as Murray Dunlap
- Turhan Bey as Calvin
- Henry Silva as Scott Lindsey
- Sigal Diamant as The Receptionist
- Joe Kuroda as Mr. Wong
- Byron Mann as Fok Ping Wong
- Melissa Brasselle as Trina
- Fred Olen Ray as The Waiter
- Amy Rochelle as Bikini Woman
- Alan Amiel as Detective
- Elana Shoshan as Sheila
- Peter Spellos as Ed "Big Ed"
- Kimberly O'Brien as Jill
- Dawn Warner Ramos as Prostitute (uncredited)
