= Chained Heat =

- Poster
- Directed by: Paul Nicholas
- Written by: Aaron Butler; Paul Nicholas
- Produced by: Billy Fine; Monica Teuber
- Starring: Linda Blair; John Vernon; Sybil Danning; Tamara Dobson; Stella Stevens; Sharon Hughes; Susan Meschner; Greta Blackburn; Robert Miano; Edy Williams; Jennifer Ashley; Kendall Kaldwell; Dee Biederbeck; Leila Chrystie; Louisa Moritz; Nita Talbot; Michael Callan; Henry Silva
- Cinematography: Mac Ahlberg
- Edited by: Nino di Marco
- Music by: Joseph Conlan
- Production companies: Intercontinental Pictures; Jensen Farley Pictures; TAT Filmproduktion
- Distributed by: Jensen Farley Pictures
- Release dates: May 27, 1983 (USA); August 12, 1983 (West Germany)
- Running time: 95 minutes
- Countries: United States; West Germany
- Languages: English; German
- Budget: $1.3 million
- Box office: $3 million

Chained Heat (known as Das Frauenlager in West Germany) is a 1983 women-in-prison film, co-written and directed by Paul Nicholas for Jensen Farley Pictures. The film was produced by Paul Fine, who had previously produced The Concrete Jungle.

== Plot ==
The film takes place in the California women's prison in which naïve teenager Carol Henderson is sentenced to serve 18 months for accidentally killing a man. Warden Ernie Backman has a hot tub in his office; his assistant, Captain Taylor controls the prison's prostitutes and has a lover, Lester, who is also involved in a clandestine affair with Ericka, the leader of the white prisoners, while the black prisoners are led by Duchess. Eventually the administration pushes the prisoners too far and they drop their race-based feuding to revolt against their common enemy.

== Cast ==
- Linda Blair as Carol Henderson
- John Vernon as Warden Ernie Backman
- Sybil Danning as Ericka
- Tamara Dobson as Duchess
- Stella Stevens as Captain Taylor
- Henry Silva as Lester
- Sharon Hughes as Val
- Susan Meschner as Gunderson
- Robert Miano as Stone
- Greta Blackburn as Lulu
- Jennifer Ashley as Grinder
- Kendall Kaldwell as Boots
- Dee Biederbeck as Bobbi
- Leila Chrystie as Chena
- Nita Talbot as Kaufman
- Louisa Moritz as Bubbles
- Marcia Karr as Twinks
- Monique Gabrielle as Debbie
- Edy Williams as Paula
- Carole Ita White as Spider
- Michael Callan as Martin
- Irwin Keyes as Lorenzo
- Kate Vernon as Cellmate

== Production and release ==
Chained Heat was produced for $950,000. It opened on May 27, 1983 in 404 theaters nationwide and made $2,252,682 in its opening weekend. The film was in theaters for two and a half weeks in total. As of 2009, the film's domestic gross is $6,149,983.

== Reception ==
During its release the film came under fire from critics for its sexism and from gay rights activists for negative and stereotypical portrayals of lesbians as violent and predatory. A Variety review described it as "silly, almost campy" and judged Paul Nicholas to have "display[ed] little feel for the prison genre, emphasizing archaic sex-for-voyeurs scenes". As of August 2026, Chained Heat's rating on Rotten Tomatoes is 63% positive, based on 8 reviews.

The film was nominated for two Golden Raspberry Awards including Worst Actress for Linda Blair and won Worst Supporting Actress for Sybil Danning at the 4th Golden Raspberry Awards for her performances in this film and Hercules.

Chained Heat (uncut and remastered edition) was released in 2011 in a "Women in Prison" DVD box set with Red Heat (1985) and Jungle Warriors (1984).

== Sequels ==
In 1993, the sequel Chained Heat II, starring Brigitte Nielsen, Paul Koslo, Kimberley Kates and Kari Whitman was released. The film was directed by Lloyd A. Simandl and released in Canada. This was followed by the 1998 release of Chained Heat 3: Hell Mountain. The film stars Nicole Nieth, Kate Rodgers, and Bentley Mitchum and was directed by Mike Rhol from a screenplay by Chris Hyde.

Both sequels bear little to no relation to the first film.
