= Ted Prior (actor) =

American actor

- Born: August 9, 1959 (age 67); Newark, New Jersey, United States
- Occupations: Actor; producer; bodybuilder; model
- Years active: 1983–present
- Spouse: Raye Hollitt (m. 1990–1992)
- Children: 4
- Relatives: David A. Prior (brother)

Ted Prior (born August 9, 1959) is an American actor, film producer, and bodybuilder. Born in Newark, New Jersey, Prior moved to Los Angeles in the late 1970s to pursue a career as a bodybuilder. With his brother David A. Prior directing, he acted in the horror film Sledgehammer (1983), and starred in Killzone (1985). Eventually, David co-founded Action International Pictures, which specialized in making low budget genre films. In their first effort for the company, Ted had a supporting role in the horror film Killer Workout (1987) and the lead in the action film Deadly Prey (1987).

Moving forward, Prior became an action film leading man for Action International Pictures until the 1990s. Separately from them, Prior acted in Hardcase and Fist (1989), Possessed by the Night (1994), Day of the Warrior (1996), among others.

Ted and David made several films together, including Future Zone (1990), The Final Sanction (1990), Raw Nerve (1991), and Night Claws (2012). Upon noticing the cult following that had arisen around Deadly Prey, they made a sequel, Deadliest Prey in 2013.

== Early life and bodybuilding ==
Ted Prior was born on August 9, 1959. Prior said "I got into bodybuilding when I was 15 years old. I won the Teenage Mr. Maryland contest along with 10 other titles by the time I was 19. The reason I moved to California was to go to “gold’s gym” and become a pro bodybuilder."

== Career ==
=== 1983-1985: Early works ===
In 1983, Prior acted in the horror film Sledgehammer with his brother David directing. Katie Rife of The A.V. Club said the film "has the distinction of being the first shot-on-video slasher movie. That film established patterns that would persist throughout Prior’s (David) career, namely, extremely low budgets, hammy dialogue, outrageous action, and, most importantly, the presence of his brother Ted".

In 1984, was the centerfold model for the magazine Playgirl for their March edition. Prior said of the experience "I never really wanted to model. That was just something that fell into my lap. I did it because I was dancing for Chippendales at the time and it helped to promote us and make money."

In 1985, Prior starred in a lead role in Killzone.

=== 1987-1999: Action film leading man ===
In 1987, Prior acted in two Action International Pictures releases. The first was a supporting role in the horror film Killer Workout. Prior's second Action International Pictures film was in the leading role in action film Deadly Prey, co-starring Cameron Mitchell.

In 1988, he acted in Hell on the Battleground, and The Lost Platoon.

In 1989, Prior was a lead in Hardcase and Fist, Jungle Assault, Hell on the Battleground, and Born Killer. That year he also acted in Heaven can help.

In 1990, Prior was a lead in two films directed by his brother: Future Zone, and The Final Sanction.

In 1991, Prior acted in Raw Nerve and Maximum Breakout.

In 1992, Prior acted in Center of the web.

In 1993, he acted in Double Threat and Possessed by the Night.

In 1994, Prior acted in Raw Justice.

In 1996, Prior acted in Day of the warrior.

In 1998, Prior acted in Dead by dawn.

In 2000, Prior started managing Next Level Acting Studios in California and became a partner of the production company All American Pictures. Prior said of the experience: "I taught acting in Hollywood for a number of years. There’s many ways to approach developing a character. For me it starts with the role. Who am I, What do I want, why do I want, and how do I get it. There’s all kinds of silly answers to these questions but at the end of the day you get out there and do it."

In 2003, Prior acted in Mutant Species.

In 2012, Prior acted in Night Claws.

In 2013, Prior acted in Deadliest Prey. On making a sequel to Deadly Prey, Prior said that he and his brother "decided to do a sequel based on fan mail, screenings, and all that stuff. I’ve talked to lot of fans of the movie, and after having all kinds of ideas thrown at us, Dave and I have decided to stick to the basic formula as the original. Fast pace and hard hitting."

In 2015, Prior acted in The Last House.

== Filmography ==
- The Last House (2015)
- Relentless Justice (2015)
- The Deadliest Prey (2013)
- Lost at War (2007)
- The Hostage (1998)
- Dead by Dawn (1998)
- The P.A.C.K. (1997)
- Day of the Warrior (1996)
- Mutant Species (1995)
- Raw Justice (1994)
- Possessed by the Night (1994)
- Double Threat (1993)
- Ultraman: The Ultimate Hero (1 episode)
- Falling Stars Spell Trouble
- Center of the Web (1992)
- Raw Nerve (1991)
- Born Killer (1991)
- Maximum Breakout (1991)
- The Final Sanction (1990)
- Future Zone (1990)
- Jungle Assault (1989)
- Hell on the Battleground (1989)
- Hardcase and Fist (1989)
- Deadly Prey (1988)
- Karate Warrior 2 (1988)
- Operation Warzone (1988)
- Surf Nazis Must Die (1987)
- Killer Workout (1986)
- Killzone (1985)
- Sledgehammer (1983)
