= Frank Sivero =

American actor (born 1952)

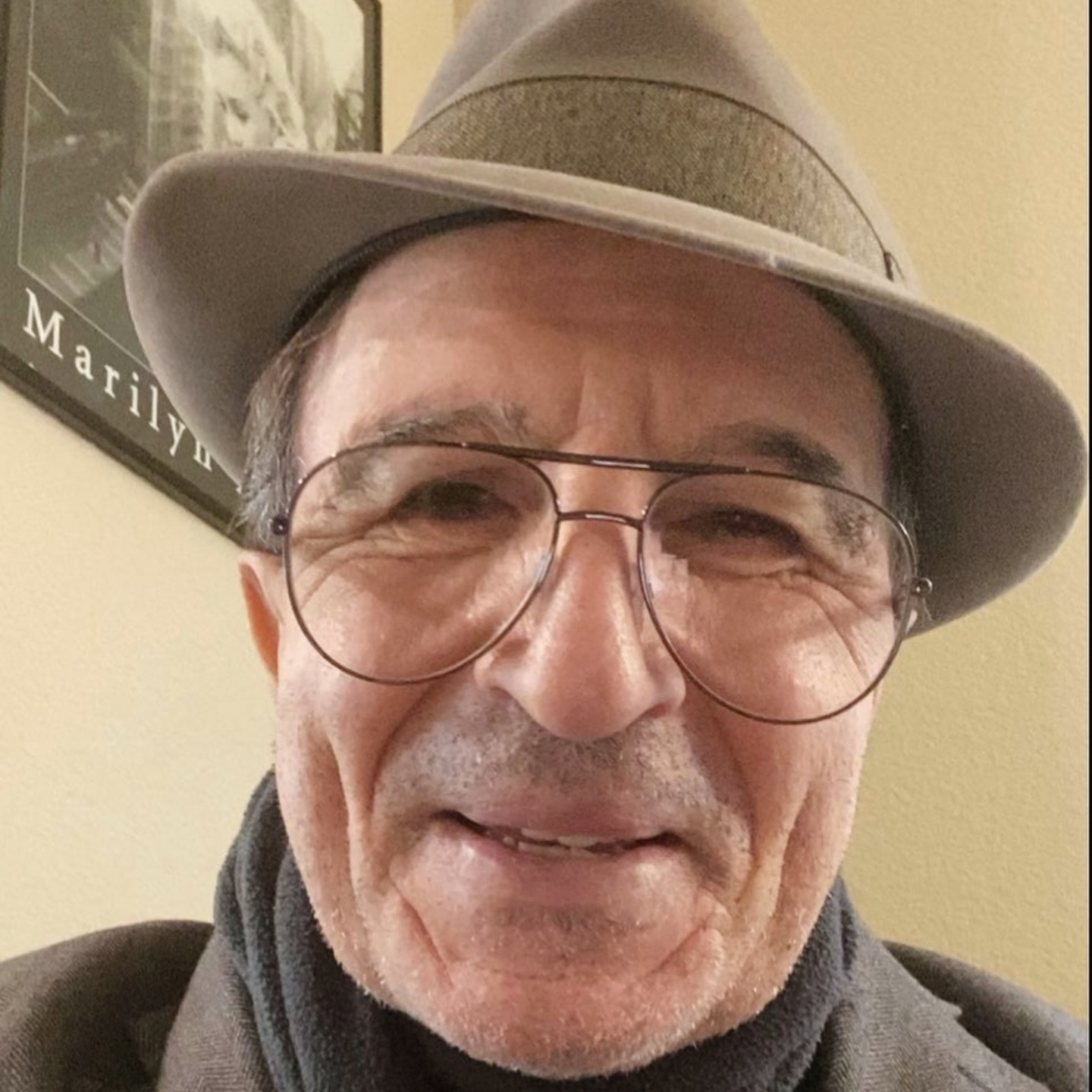
- Sivero in 2021
- Born: Francesco Lo Giudice; January 6, 1952 (age 74); Siculiana, Sicily, Italy
- Occupation: Actor
- Years active: 1966–present

Frank Sivero (born Francesco Lo Giudice; January 6, 1952) is an Italian-American actor. He played Genco Abbandando in Francis Ford Coppola's The Godfather Part II, and Frankie Carbone in Martin Scorsese's Goodfellas.

== Early life ==
Sivero was born Francesco Lo Giudice in Sicily, Italy. His family worked as farmers, and they lived in the town of Siculiana. The family moved to Brooklyn, New York, when he was 11 years old. Before his career, he studied acting at drama workshops.

== Career ==
Sivero was noted for his role in the 1974 film The Godfather Part II, directed by Francis Ford Coppola, in which he played Genco Abbandando, the original consigliere to mobster Vito Corleone. In 1990, he played Frankie Carbone, based on real-life gangster Angelo Sepe, in Martin Scorsese's film Goodfellas. Sivero's filmography also includes the 1998 romantic comedy The Wedding Singer, in which he appeared as the brother-in-law of the title character, Robbie.

== The Simpsons lawsuit ==
In October 2014, Sivero initiated a $250 million lawsuit against Fox Television Studios. The lawsuit alleged that in 1989 Sivero was living next door to writers from The Simpsons and the writers knew he was working on his Goodfellas character. It alleged that the writers "were aware that the entire character of 'Frankie Carbone' was created and developed by Sivero, who based this character on his own personality." A short time later, a character named Louie began appearing on The Simpsons. Louie was described as a mafioso character, second in command to Fat Tony, and similar in appearance and mannerisms to Sivero, and Sivero alleged that his "likeness [was] being infringed in violation of California's publicity rights law." The case was dismissed in August 2015, with the judge asserting that the character Louie was a parody of several mob characters.

== Filmography ==
- The Godfather (1972) - extra in the Sonny beats Carlo scene (uncredited)
- Shamus (1973) - Bookie
- The Gambler (1974) - Donny's driver
- The Godfather Part II (1974) - Genco Abbandando
- Happy Days (1974) - Pockets
- New York, New York (1977) - Eddie DiMuzio
- The Billion Dollar Hobo (1977) - Ernie
- Fyre (1979) - Pickpocket
- Sunnyside (1979) - Dezi
- Going Ape! (1981) - Bad Habit
- Fighting Back (1982) - Frank Russo
- Blood Feud (1983) - Anthony Russo
- Fear City (1984) - Mobster #2
- The Ratings Game (1984) - Bruno
- Ruthless People (1986) - Mugger
- 52 Pick-Up (1986) - Vendor
- The Galucci Brothers (1987) - Frankie
- Crossing the Mob (1988) - Frank
- Goodfellas (1990) - Frank Carbone
- Cop and a Half (1993) - Chu
- Fist of Honor (1993) - Frankie Pop
- Painted Desert (1993) - Johnny
- Possessed by the Night (1994) - Murray Dunlap
- Dumb Luck in Vegas (1997) - Snake
- The Wedding Singer (1998) - Andy
- Urban Relics (1998) - Tommy Two-Lips
- Foolish (1999) - Giovanni
- Mariah#1's (1999) - Henchman (segment "Honey")
- Carlo's Wake (1999) - Uncle Leo
- Little Nicky (2000) - Alumni Hall Announcer
- Truth Be Told (2002) - LaTrenta
- The Aviator (2004) - Photographer (uncredited)
- Eddie Monroe (2006) - Angelo
- Shortcut to Happiness (2007) - Luigi
- Ring of Death (2008) - Tommy Micelli
- Hotel California (2008) - Sal
