= Wizards of the Demon Sword =

- VHS cover art
- Directed by: Fred Olen Ray
- Screenplay by: Dan Golden; Ernest Farin
- Produced by: Grant Austin Waldman; Fred Olen Ray
- Starring: Russ Tamblyn
- Cinematography: Gary Graver
- Distributed by: Troma
- Release date: 1991
- Country: United States
- Language: English

Wizards of the Demon Sword is a 1991 American film directed by Fred Olen Ray and starring Russ Tamblyn.

== Plot ==
Ulric's daughter unites with warrior Thane against evil Lord Khoura, who covets the knife of Aktar.

== Cast ==
- Lyle Waggoner as Lord Khoura
- Russ Tamblyn as Ulric
- Blake Bahner as Thane
- Heidi Paine as Malina
- Jay Richardson as Omar
- Dawn Wildsmith as Selena
- Dan Speaker as Damon
- Hoke Howell as Seer of Roebuck
- Dan Golden as Gorgon
- Lawrence Tierney as Slave Master
- Michael Berryman
- Jim Mitchum

== Production ==
Fred Olen Ray says the film has its genesis with sets left over from Roger Corman's Masque of the Red Death. The sets were going to be torn down so Ray decided to use them for a film. A script was written, actors hired (including Russ Tamblyn) and Ray shot two days of a sword-and-sorcery film, Wizards of the Demon Sword. He then planned filming the rest of the film. They only needed four days, and had five days' use left of the camera equipment. Ray decided to make another movie, Bad Girls from Mars. It was one of several collaborations between Tamblyn and Ray.

Dan Golden rewrote a script from another writer.

== Reception ==
According to Ray, Demon Sword "tanked financially" in part because the film wound up at Troma who "ripped him off".
