= Nita Talbot =

American actress (born 1930)

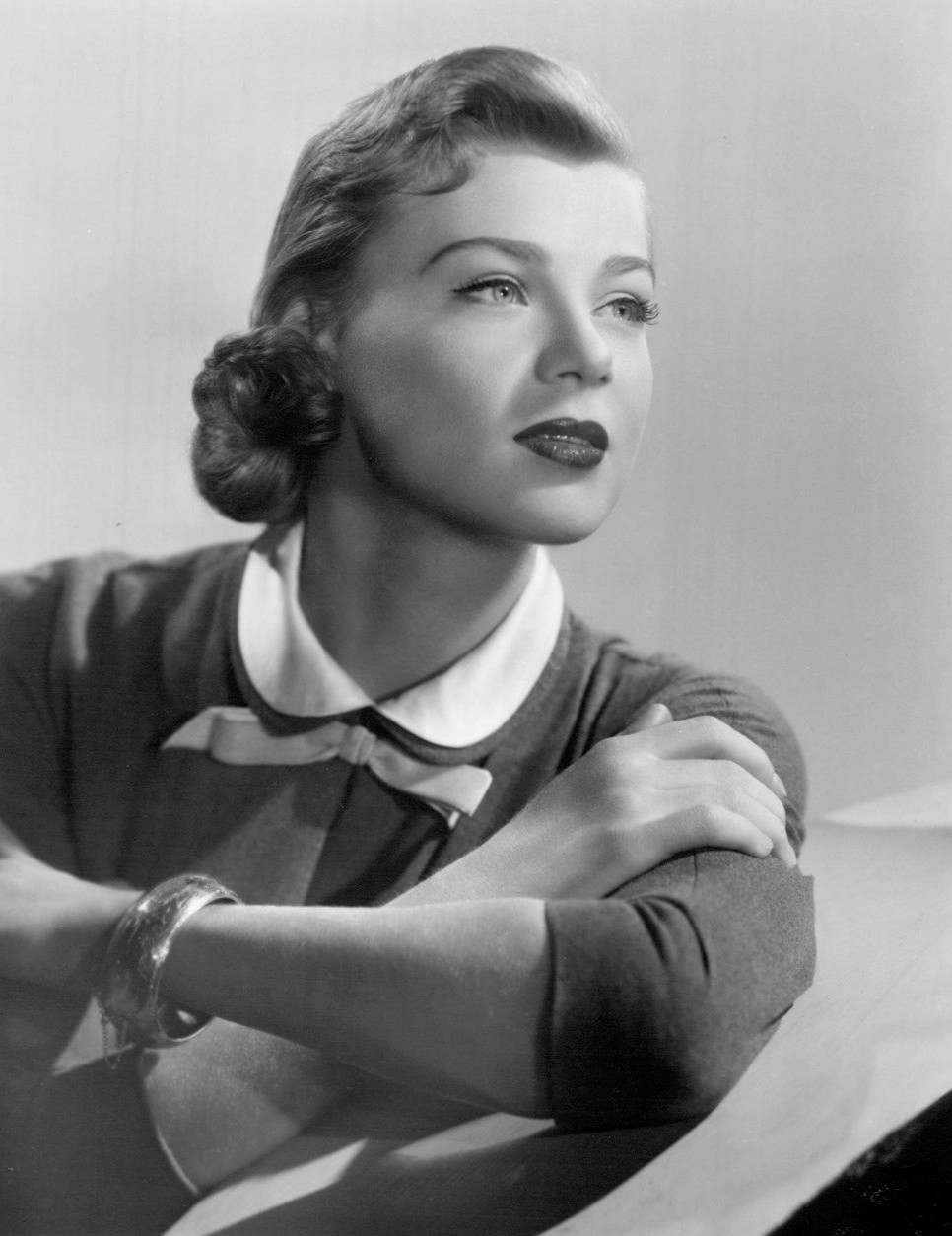
- Talbot in 1956
- Born: Anita Sokol; August 8, 1930 (age 96); New York City, U.S.
- Occupation: Actress
- Years active: 1949–1997
- Spouses: Don Gordon (m. 1954; div. 1958) Thomas A. Geas (m. 1961; div. 1964)
- Children: 1

Nita Talbot (born Anita Sokol; August 8, 1930) is an American former actress. She received an Emmy Award nomination for Best Supporting Actress in a Comedy Series for the 1967–68 season of Hogan's Heroes.

== Film ==
Born in New York City on August 8, 1930, of Hungarian-Jewish ancestry, Talbot began her acting career appearing as a model in the 1949 film It's a Great Feeling. She was afforded a wealth of varied screen roles, from the love-starved switchboard operator in A Very Special Favor (1965) to the sharp-tongued Madame Esther in Buck and the Preacher (1972). She also appeared in such films as Bright Leaf (1950), This Could Be the Night (1957), I Married a Woman (1958), Who's Got the Action? (1962), Girl Happy (1965), The Day of the Locust (1975), Serial (1980), Night Shift (1982), Chained Heat (1983), Fraternity Vacation (1985), and Puppet Master II (1990).

== Television ==
Appearing in many TV series, Talbot was seen as Mabel Spooner opposite Larry Blyden's Joe Spooner in Joe and Mabel (1956); Iris Anderson in the 1958 Perry Mason episode "The Case of the Pint-Sized Client"; con-woman Blondie Collins in the second season of The Thin Man (1958–59); con-woman/struggling actress Susan Reed in the first-season episode "Beautiful, Blue and Deadly" of Mickey Spillane's Mike Hammer (1958–59); the immigrant wife in "Land Deal" (season 4, episode 9) on Gunsmoke (1958); and as Belle in "Belle's Back" (1960). In 1960, she also appeared in The Tab Hunter Show episode "Be My Guest."

She was in the Alfred Hitchcock Presents episode "Maria" (1961), as a circus blonde who loses her husband to an evil dwarf woman (whose act consists of playing a monkey able to draw what it sees) who made her husband believe she had been unfaithful. She appeared with Jack Kelly in the Maverick third-season episode "Easy Mark" (1959) as a woman hired to "distract" Bart masquerading as millionaire Cornelius Van Rennselaer Jr., and played against type in the Maverick third-season episode "The Resurrection of Joe November" with James Garner (1960). She was the resourceful Girl-Friday, Dora Miles, on The Jim Backus Show (also known as Hot Off the Wire), snooty socialite Judy Evans in Here We Go Again (1973), and hypercynical Rose opposite Bill Daily in Starting from Scratch (1988).

Between 1966 and 1971, Talbot appeared in seven episodes of Hogan's Heroes as pretend White Russian spy Marya, a role for which she received a Primetime Emmy Award nomination for Best Supporting Actress in a Comedy Series in 1968 for the episode "The Hostage". She was a recurring guest star on several other series, including Man Against Crime, Bourbon Street Beat (four episodes as Lusti Weather), The Secret Storm, Mannix and Supertrain, while also appearing in single episodes of other shows, including the Kolchak: The Night Stalker episode, 'The Werewolf'. Talbot also had long-running roles in Search for Tomorrow and General Hospital. On General Hospital, she portrayed Delfina from 1981 to 1983 (and again in 1992), Tiffany Hill's old friend who takes over designing Luke and Laura's wedding.

In 1971, Talbot was cast in the pilot episode of the CBS sitcom Funny Face starring actress-comedian Sandy Duncan as Sandy Stockton, a young UCLA student from Illinois majoring in education and making ends meet by working part-time as an actress in television commercials for the Prescott Advertising Agency. Talbot played Sandy's agent, Maggie Prescott. Shortly after filming the pilot, CBS picked up the programme for the autumn of 1971, but revised the format slightly, resulting in Talbot being dropped from the cast. She appeared in "A Stitch in Crime", episode 6 of the second season of Columbo (1973). Her last acting role was in 1997, when she voiced the character of Anastasia Hardy, the businesswoman mother of Felicia Hardy, the Black Cat, in the animated series Spider-Man.

== Personal life ==
Talbot was married twice—first to actor Don Gordon (September 7, 1954, to April 11, 1958; divorced) and then to actor Thomas A. Geas (from August 13, 1961, until their divorce in 1964). She has one daughter, Nicole Andrea Geas, who was born in Los Angeles on May 28, 1962. Talbot is Jewish.

== Selected credits ==
From Hollywood.com

Film
Year	Film	Role	Notes
1949	Always Leave Them Laughing	Showgirl	Uncredited
1950	Caged	Inmate	Uncredited
1950	This Side of the Law	Miss Goff	
1951	On Dangerous Ground	Woman in bar	Uncredited
1956	Bundle of Joy	Mary	
1958	I Married a Woman	Miss Anderson	
1962	Who's Got the Action?	Saturday Knight	
1965	Girl Happy	Sunny Daze	
1965	A Very Special Favor	Mickey	
1965	That Funny Feeling	Audrey	
1967	The Cool Ones	Dee Dee Howitzer	Alternative title: Cool Baby, Cool!
1972	Buck and the Preacher	Madam Esther	
1975	The Manchu Eagle Murder Caper Mystery	Jasmine Cornell	
1975	The Day of the Locust	Joan	
1980	Serial	Angela Stone	
1980	Island Claws	Rosie	Alternative title: Night of the Claw
1982	Night Shift	Vivian	
1982	The Concrete Jungle	Shelly Meyers	
1983	Frightmare	Mrs. Rohmer	
1983	Chained Heat	Kaufman	
1985	Fraternity Vacation	Mrs. Ferret	
1985	Movers & Shakers	Dorothy	
1991	Puppet Master II	Camille Kenney	Direct-to-video release
1992	Amityville: It's About Time	Iris Wheeler	Alternative title: Amityville 1992: It's About Time, direct-to-video release
Television
Year	Title	Role	Notes
1952	Tales of Tomorrow	Nicki	1 episode
1954	Inner Sanctum	Millie	1 episode
1955	Producers' Showcase	Olga	1 episode
1956	Joe and Mabel	Mabel	13 episodes
1957	Climax!	Esther Gardener	1 episode
1958	Jane Wyman Presents The Fireside Theatre	Sally	1 episode
1958	Mr. Adams and Eve	Anna	1 episode
1958	Gunsmoke	Sidna Calhoun	1 episode "Land Deal"
1958	Alfred Hitchcock Presents	Louise Williams	Season 3 Episode 14: "The Percentage"
1958	Perry Mason	Iris Anderson	1 episode "The Case Of The Pint-Sized Client"
1958	Mickey Spillane's Mike Hammer	Susan Reed	1 episode
1959	The Lineup	Donna	1 episode
1959	Maverick	Jeannie	2 episodes "Easy Mark" and "Resurrection of Joe November"
1959	Peter Gunn	Rowena	1 episode
1959	Johnny Staccato	Narcissa	1 episode "The Man in the Pit"
1959	Mickey Spillane's Mike Hammer	Mimi	1 episode "Save Me in San Salvador"
1959	The Lawless Years	Selma Kasoff	1 episode "The Muddy Kasoff Story"
1960	The Jim Backus Show	Dora Miles	Unknown episodes
1960	The Man from Blackhawk	Kay	1 episode: "In His Steps"
1960	Mr. Lucky	Kitten Conner	1 episode
1960	The Untouchables	Alice	1 episode
1960	Gunsmoke	Belle Ainsley	1 episode
1960	The Tab Hunter Show	Stephanie	1 episode "Be My Guest"
1961	Alfred Hitchcock Presents	Carol Thorby	Season 7 Episode 3: "Maria"
1961	Follow the Sun	Florence	1 episode
1961	The Lawless Years	Mildred Greyson	1 episode "Triple Cross"
1963	The Littlest Hobo	Marguerite Marlowe	1 episode "Cry Wolf"
1964	The Lieutenant	Marie Newton	1 episode
1966	The Fugitive	Paula Jellison	1 episode "This'll Kill You" with Mickey Rooney
1966	The Virginian	Melinda	1 episode
1966–1971	Hogan's Heroes	Marya	7 episodes, Primetime Emmy Award nomination
1966	Daniel Boone	Sylvie Du Marais	S2/E24 "The Search"
1967	Mannix	Gloria Turnbull	1 episode
1967	Bonanza	Gladys	1 episode
1968	The Monkees	The Assistant	1 episode, "Monkees Watch Their Feet"
1968	Gomer Pyle – USMC	Pola Prevost	1 episode
1971	Love, American Style	Connie	1 episode
1971	The Jimmy Stewart Show	Roxy	1 episode
1972	Bewitched	Mrs. Rollnick	1 episode
1972	Mannix	Joan Martin	1 episode
1973	Columbo	Marsha Dalton	1 episode, "A Stitch in Crime"
1973	Needles and Pins	Francine	1 episode, "The Endangered Species"
1973	The Partridge Family	Doris Stevens	1 episode
1973	Here We Go Again	Judy Evans	13 episodes
1974	Police Story	Teresa	1 episode
1974	The Rockford Files	Mildred Elias	2 episodes, "Backlash of the Hunter" pts 1 & 2
1974	Kolchak: The Night Stalker	Paula Griffin	1 Episode, "The Werewolf"
1975	Police Woman	Audrey Roth	1 episode
1977	All in the Family	Marcia	1 episode
1977–1978	Soap	Sheila Fine	3 episodes
1978	CHiPs	Driving Instructor	1 episode
1978	Hawaii-Five-O	Eudora	1 episode
1979	Charlie's Angels	Willamena	1 episode
1979	Supertrain	Rose Casey	5 episodes
1980	Nobody's Perfect	Lush	1 episode
1981–1982	General Hospital	Delfina	
1984	Remington Steele	Shirley Mellish	1 episode
1985	Scarecrow and Mrs. King	Wilma	1 episode
1987	It's a Living	Rose	1 episode
1989	Jake Spanner, Private Eye	Nurse	Television movie
1990	Gabriel's Fire	Laura Pickles	1 episode
1991	The New Adam-12	Madam Lousanga	1 episode
1994	Empty Nest	Mrs. Koontz	1 episode
1995	Pig Sty	Cecile	1 episode
1997	Spider-Man: The Animated Series	Anastacia Hardy	Voice
