= Killer Workout =

1987 film by David A. Prior

- Promotional poster
- Directed by: David A. Prior
- Written by: David A. Prior
- Produced by: Peter Yuval
- Starring: Marcia Karr; David Campbell; Fritz Matthews; Ted Prior; Teresa Van der Woude; Richard Bravo
- Cinematography: Peter Bonilla
- Edited by: David A. Prior
- Music by: Todd Hayen
- Production company: Maverick Films Productions
- Distributed by: Academy Home Entertainment
- Release date: March 27, 1987
- Running time: 86 minutes
- Country: United States
- Language: English

Killer Workout (originally titled Aerobicide) is a 1987 American slasher film written and directed by David A. Prior, and starring Marcia Karr, David James Campbell, Fritz Matthews, Ted Prior, Teresa Van der Woude, and Richard Bravo. The story revolves around a Los Angeles fitness club owned by Rhonda Johnson, whose twin sister burned in a tanning salon five years ago. Detective Morgan begins to investigate the gym, after several of its members are brutally murdered by an unknown attacker.

== Plot ==
A young model, Valerie, is burned in a tanning salon accident. Five years later, Valerie's twin sister Rhonda Johnson is operating a fitness club in Los Angeles. Rhonda chastises one of her employees, Jaimy, for missing an aerobics class she was supposed to lead. Shortly after, a killer brandishing a large safety pin enters the women's locker room and slashes Rachael, a client, to death. While closing the club, Jaimy finds her corpse stuffed in a locker, as well as a blood-soaked knitting needle in the locker of Diane Matthews. Detective Morgan is assigned to the murder case and questions Rhonda and Jaimy.

The next day, Chuck is unexpectedly hired by Rhonda's senior managing partner of the club. Chuck gets into a physical fight with patron Jimmy, which impresses club patron Debbie, Jimmy's ex-girlfriend. Later, Morgan learns that Diane's knitting needle was not the weapon used to kill Rachael. Later that night, a group of teenagers vandalize the club with spray paint, only to be brutally murdered by an unseen assailant.

The next day, Tom, a club patron whom Morgan has deemed a suspect, is murdered in the locker room, and later, Jaimy is found hanged inside the club. Rhonda harangues Morgan for her perceived ineffectiveness of his investigation. Morgan uncovers that Rhonda is in fact Valerie, who survived the tanning accident, and that she never had a twin sister—instead, she legally changed her name to Rhonda and has kept her badly-scarred body hidden with clothing and a wig. Morgan confronts Rhonda with his discovery, and she admits it, but remains stern and impervious to his assertion that she may be the murderer, killing out of jealousy.

Shortly after, Chuck is murdered. Morgan tracks Jimmy to a nearby concrete plant, believing that Jimmy has taken the fall as a suspect given there is no evidence linking him to the crimes. Morgan confronts Jimmy at gunpoint, questioning him if Rhonda committed the murders, but Jimmy manages to incapacitate Morgan. Jimmy returns to the gym and is shot to death by Rhonda, but not before admitting he killed Chuck out of his love for her, hoping to implicate himself to spare her from being suspected by police. Rhonda claims self-defense, and Jimmy is widely believed to have committed the serial killings.

Some time later, Rhonda is brought to a wooded area by Morgan. When asked why they are there, Morgan recounts a story of his police officer father, who enacted vigilante justice against a serial killer whose case was dismissed on a technicality. Knowing that Rhonda will not be prosecuted for her crimes due to Jimmy's involvement, Morgan attempts to kill Rhonda, but she manages to kill him using a shovel.

Rhonda returns to her gym to oversee it, and is congratulated by her patrons, who herald her as a hero. In her office, she removes the large safety pin from her desk and fondles it, smiling.

== Cast ==
- Marcia Karr as Rhonda Johnson
- David James Campbell as Lt. Morgan
- Fritz Matthews as Jimmy
- Ted Prior as Chuck
- Teresa Van der Woude as Jaimy
- Dianne Copeland as Debbie
- Laurel Mock as Diane Matthews
- Teresa Truesdale as Rachael McClee
- Lynn Meighan as Cathy
- Denise Martell as Marsha
- Michael Beck as Curtis

== Release ==
=== Home media ===
Killer Workout was released direct-to-video in the United Kingdom under the alternative title Aerobicide in the spring of 1987. Academy Home Entertainment released the film on video in the United States on March 27, 1987. In 2016, Olive Films released a Blu-ray edition under their Slasher Video sub-label.

The high-definition release faced scrutiny from home video reviewers for technical issues regarding playback speed and audio pitch. Because the original camera negatives are considered lost, the transfer was sourced and upconverted from a PAL Beta SP tape master. Because this source material was derived from a European PAL broadcast master, the 4% PAL speedup was baked into the 1080i video transfer. Consequently, the release features a shorter runtime and an artificially higher audio pitch compared to the original NTSC theatrical standard and older standard-definition video releases.

=== Critical reception ===
A reviewer credited as "Lor." of Variety reviewed the film on March 14, 1987 on VHS by Academy Home Entertainment. "Lor." described the film as a "pretty standard slasher" and "unexciting", "Lor." noted the film was too sparing in nude scenes to satisfy a voyeur audience while the final reel "boasts a couple of nice twists and an amoral ending."

In his book Horror and Science Fiction Film IV, Donald C Willis referred to the film as a "lame horror thriller" that was "crude at everything - t&a displays in the gym, suspense sequences, plot twists." In their review of the blu-ray, Bloody Disgusting opined that "the plot is the very basic slasher setup in that you meet a handful of characters and an unknown killer begins picking them off one by one...none of the characters are very well developed and are introduced to fit two very specific needs – be eye candy and become victims...this won’t result in a groundbreaking slasher that breaks the mold, but it works perfectly to create some enjoyable trash".

== See also ==
- Death Spa

== Sources ==
- Lor. (1991). Variety's Film Reviews 1987-1988. Vol. 20. R. R. Bowker. There are no page numbers in this book. This entry is found under the header "April 15, 1987". ISBN 978-0-835-23273-9.
- Willis, Donald C. (1997). Horror and Science Fiction Films IV. Lanham, Maryland: Scarecrow Press. ISBN 978-0-810-83055-4.
