= She (1984 film) =

Post apocalyptic film by Avi Nesher

- Directed by: Avi Nesher
- Screenplay by: Avi Nesher
- Based on: She by H. Rider Haggard
- Produced by: Renato Dandi
- Starring: Sandahl Bergman; David Goss; Quin Kessler; Harrison Muller Jr.
- Cinematography: Sandro Mancori
- Edited by: Nicholas Wentworth
- Music by: Phil Campbell; Justin Hayward; Rick Wakeman
- Production companies: Continental Motion Pictures; Royal Films B.V.; Trans World Entertainment (TWE)
- Release date: 19 September 1984 (Panama)
- Running time: 106 minutes
- Country: Italy

She is an Italian post apocalyptic film directed by Avi Nesher and starring Sandahl Bergman. It was based on H. Rider Haggard's 1887 novel She: A History of Adventure.

== Plot ==
The film, set in a land of warring tribes 23 years after a nuclear war, follows Tom and his friend Dick, whose sister Hari has been captured by a powerful tribe called the Norks. Tom and Dick set out to find and rescue Hari, attempting to avoid dangerous tribes along the way. They are captured by a matriarchal clan called the Urechs, led by "She" (Sandahl Bergman). The two manage to escape. She's forces track them down, but She decides to help them in their quest after hearing a prophecy from a local seer about a man she is destined to meet. She and her lieutenant Shanda join Tom and Dick on their travels.

They encounter many other tribes, each led by their own post-apocalyptic 'god', with the encounters usually ending in a battle. Each tribal ‘god’ has an army of mutants with special abilities apparently granted by the nuclear radiation. One god-pretender, Godan, can levitate his enemies, but is betrayed by his second-in-command, a woman in red who is upset that Godan has taken She as a lover. The heroes also face a tutu-wearing giant, toga-wearing werewolves, high society vampires, mutants bandaged like Egyptian mummies, and a man named Xenon who can create clones of himself from severed parts of his body. The group becomes separated and make their way separately to the Nork fortress.

After being captured by the Norks, She, Tom, and Dick, all masked, are forced into a gladiator combat melee with a group of Nork applicants. Fortunately, after dispatching the other combatants, the three recognize each other and stop the fight. Hari, who has been made the concubine of the Nork leader, rushes to their side. The Nork leader considers this an affront, and tells the party that they may leave, but that as punishment his forces will attack and enslave the Urechs the next day.

They are released, but She decides to mount an ambush of the Nork forces on a bridge before the Norks can get close to Urech lands. Tom, Dick, and Hari aid her in setting numerous traps. When the Nork forces arrive, the party faces wave after wave of combatants. As the Norks finally begin to overwhelm them, they are rescued when Shanda and a squad of Urech warriors arrive and rout the remaining Norks. Finally victorious, the group celebrates. Dick and Shanda, She's second-in-command, have fallen in love, and Dick elects to stay with the Urechs. Tom and She silently decide to love each other from a distance. As Tom takes a barge with his sister Hari to other faraway lands, She pensively watches then depart.

== Cast ==
- Sandahl Bergman – She
- David Goss – Tom
- Quin Kessler – Shanda
- Harrison Muller – Dick
- Elena Wiedermann – Hari
- Gordon Mitchell – Hector
- Mario Pedone - Rudolph
- Donald Hodson - Rabel
- Maria Cumani Quasimodo - Moona
- David Kirk Traylor - Xenon

== Production ==
In the January 1983 issue of Starlog, it was reported that Sandahl Bergman was currently in Rome filming She.

== Release ==
She was shown in Panama on September 19, 1984.

She was released in the United States on December 25, 1985, with a 106-minute running time.

== Reception ==
TV Guide gave the film two of five stars, noting the film was full of lowbrow humor and an incoherent plot, and that after a delayed release it "finally was foisted onto audiences courtesy of the Cinemax cable television network, a veritable dumping ground for movies that can't even get into third-run cinemas." In John Stanley's Creature Features movie guide, the film also received two of five stars, noting it was a black parody full of anachronisms. As of June 2019, the film had a score of 18% at Rotten Tomatoes. Kim Newman found the film similar to others of the genre, with little new to offer.

Neil Gaiman reviewed She for Imagine magazine, and stated that the film was "just bad enough to be very funny for those willing to ignore the fact that the plot, the acting and the direction are of Plan Nine From Outer Space standard. A must for anyone who likes throwing popcorn at the screen."
