= Marcia Karr =

US actress active in the 1980s

Marcia Karr (/mɑːrsiːə/; born June 29, 1963) is an American former actress who appeared in several exploitation and horror films in the 1980s, including Chained Heat (1983), Savage Streets (1984), Killer Workout (1987), and Maniac Cop (1988).

== Biography ==
Karr was born and raised in Pennsauken Township, New Jersey. As a teenager, Karr ran away and relocated to Los Angeles. She began her film career performing as a body double for Barbara Hershey in the 1981 horror film The Entity.

Karr made her feature film debut in The Concrete Jungle (1982), and subsequently appeared opposite Linda Blair in the women-in-prison film Chained Heat (1983). The following year, she again co-starred with Blair in the exploitation vigilante film Savage Streets (1984). She later had a lead role in the slasher film Killer Workout (1987), playing the proprietor of a fitness spa where a series of murders are occurring. She also had a supporting role in the slasher film Maniac Cop (1988). In 1988, she served as a casting director for the horror film Cheerleader Camp.

After retiring from acting in the early 1990s, Karr relocated to Arizona with her husband and worked for eight years as a corporate fundraiser for the Make-A-Wish Foundation. She has since worked for the non-profit charities ChildFund and International Medical Corps.

== Filmography ==
Year	Title	Role	Notes	Ref.
1981	The Entity		Body double for Barbara Hershey	
1982	The Concrete Jungle	Marcy		
1983	Chained Heat	Twinks		
1984	Hardbodies	Hardbody on the stairs		
1984	Savage Streets	Stevie		
1985	Real Genius	Cornell's Girl at Party		
1986	Sex Appeal	Christina		
1987	The Night Stalker	H. J. Salters		
1987	Killer Workout	Rhonda Johnson	Alternate title: Aerobicide	
1987	Death Blow: A Cry for Justice	Sophie	Alternate title: W.A.R.: Women Against Rape	
1988	Maniac Cop	Nancy		
1988	Night of the Kickfighters	Kedesha		
1989	Narco Dollar	Eva Jimenez		
1990	Nobody's Perfect	Marge		
