= Edy Williams =

American television and film actress (born 1942)

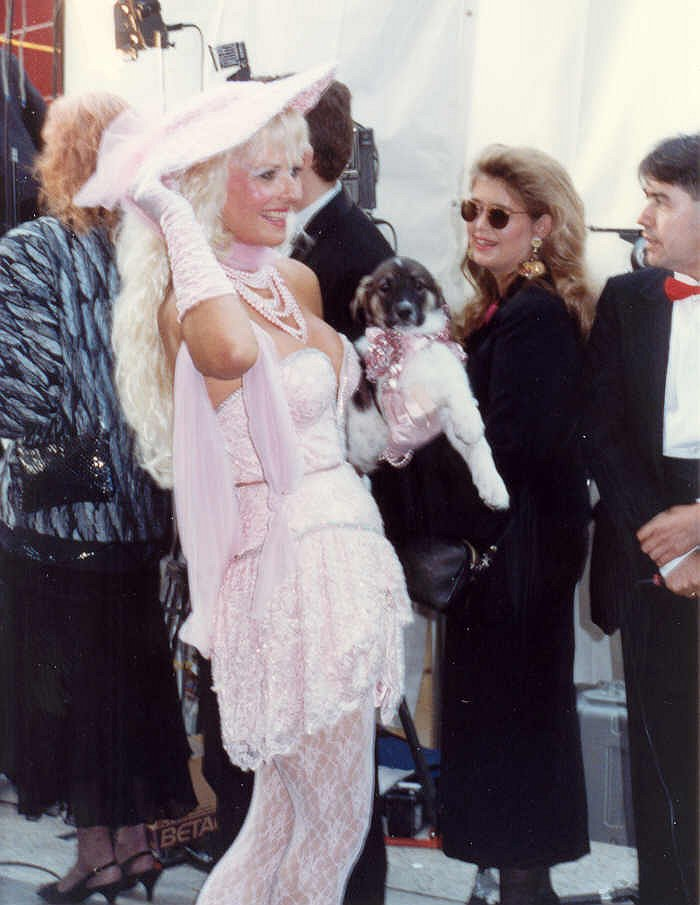
- Williams at the 62nd Academy Awards, 1990
- Born: Edwina Beth Williams; July 9, 1942 (age 83); Salt Lake City, Utah, U.S.
- Occupations: Actress and model
- Years active: 1962–1995
- Height: 5 ft 7 in (170 cm)
- Spouse: Russ Meyer (m. 1970–1975)

Edwina Beth Williams (born July 9, 1942) is a retired American television and film actress who is best known for her acting work in the films of Russ Meyer, to whom she was married from 1970 to 1975.

== Early years ==
Williams was born in Salt Lake City, Utah, and raised in Southern California. She began her career as a model and beauty pageant contestant. After winning several local pageants, she was signed as a contract player by 20th Century Fox.

== Career ==
Throughout the 1960s, Williams appeared in several television series and films including roles in The Beverly Hillbillies, The Twilight Zone, Batman, Adam-12, Lost in Space, The Naked Kiss, and the Sonny & Cher film, Good Times (1967). In 1970, she appeared as Ashley St. Ives in Russ Meyer's first mainstream film, Beyond the Valley of the Dolls, followed by his second mainstream film, The Seven Minutes (1971). Meyer and Williams married in 1970, shortly after the release of Beyond the Valley of the Dolls.

In March 1973, she was photographed for Playboy in a full color photo spread by then-husband Russ Meyer. After her divorce from Meyer in 1977, Williams continued acting, mainly appearing in films, many of which involved nudity.

In 1982, she appeared on an episode of The People's Court as a defendant in a case titled "The Star Who Wouldn't Pay". She was sued for payment for publicity work the plaintiff had done for her. She countersued for half of the retainer she had paid him. After this, she was sporadically active in films during the 1980s and early 1990s.

Since the 1970s, she has traditionally appeared at both the Academy Awards and the Cannes Film Festival in revealing and flamboyant outfits.

== TV and filmography ==
Year	Title	Role	Notes
1962	The Twilight Zone	Chorus Girl	Episode: "The Dummy"
1963	For Love or Money	Edy	
1964	Man's Favorite Sport?	Second Girl	
1964	The Brass Bottle	Slave Girl	
1964	A House Is Not a Home	Call Girl	
1964	The Naked Kiss	Hatrack	Alternative title: The Iron Kiss
1965	Harlow	Mail Room Girl	
1966	Run for Your Life	Watusi Dancer	Episode: "Carnival Ends at Midnight"
1966	Nevada Smith	Saloon Girl	
1966	Paradise, Hawaiian Style	Brunette girl	
1966	Batman	Hostess/Rae	3 episodes (37, 49 and 50)
1966	Beverly Hillbillies	Bank Employee	Season 4, Episode 28 "Jethro's Pad"
1967	Good Times	Mordicus' Girl	Alternative title: Sonny & Chér in Good Times
1967	Lost in Space	Non	Episode: "Two Weeks in Space"
1968	I Sailed to Tahiti with an All Girl Crew	Marilyn	
1968	The Secret Life of an American Wife	Susie Steinberg	
1969	Where It's At	Phyllis Horrigan	
1970	Beyond the Valley of the Dolls	Ashley St. Ives	
1971	The Seven Minutes	Faye Osborn	
1973	Adam-12	Tammy Warren	Episode: "Venice Division"
1975	Dr. Minx	Dr. Carol Evans	
1977	The Happy Hooker Goes to Washington	Professor Simmons	
1979	An Almost Perfect Affair	Herself	Uncredited
1980	Willie & Phil	Ashley	Alternative title: Paul Mazurksy's Willie & Phil
1983	Chained Heat	Paula	
1984	Hollywood Hot Tubs	Desiree	
1984	Bad Manners	Mrs. Slatt	Alternative title: Growing Pains
1985	Hellhole	Vera	
1987	Mankillers	Sgt. Roberts	Alternative title: 12 Wild Women
1987	Sledge Hammer!	Dream Girl	Episode: "They Call Me Mr. Trunk"
1988	Rented Lips	Heather Darling	1988 "Nudity Required"
1989	Dr. Alien	Buckmeister	Alternative titles: I Was a Teenage Sex Maniac; I Was a Teenage Sex Mutant
1991	Bad Girls from Mars	Emanuelle	
