= Danny Steinmann =

American film director (1942–2012)

- Born: January 7, 1942; New York City, New York, U.S.
- Died: December 18, 2012 (aged 70); Los Angeles, California, U.S.
- Occupation: Director
- Years active: 1966–1985

Danny Steinmann (January 7, 1942 – December 18, 2012) was an American film director. Steinmann made his debut as both writer and director with the hardcore porno picture High Rise (1973), on which he used the alias Danny Stone. Steinmann was a production associate on Arthur Hiller's The Man in the Glass Booth (1975) and served as an associate producer on the offbeat Gene Roddenberry made-for-TV supernatural film Spectre (1977). In addition, Steinmann headed a production company in Puerto Rico that made TV commercials for such companies as International House of Pancakes, Chase Manhattan Bank and Wesson Oil.

Steinmann directed and co-wrote the horror film The Unseen (1980). Dissatisfied with the finished version of the film, Steinmann attributed his directorial credit to the pseudonym Peter Foleg. He followed this film with the teen exploitation action/revenge thriller Savage Streets (1984). Steinmann achieved relatively mainstream success with the horror sequel Friday the 13th: A New Beginning (1985). Although the movie was a financial success, the production was very troubled and proved to be his final film. He was announced as the director for a proposed sequel to the notorious The Last House on the Left (1972) but this project never came to be.

== Biography ==
Steinmann was born in New York City. He was an excellent athlete and post high school graduation distinguished himself in soccer at Clark University in Worcester, Massachusetts (1958-1960). He started his filming career as writer and director of the hardcore porn High Rise. In 1980, he directed the mainstream horror-thriller film The Unseen and in 1984 he filmed the action-crime film Savage Streets starring Linda Blair. His last film was Friday the 13th Part V: A New Beginning (1985).

== Death ==
Steinmann died on December 18, 2012, at the age of 70.

== Filmography ==
As Director

- 1973: High Rise
- 1980: The Unseen
- 1984: Savage Streets
- 1985: Friday the 13th: A New Beginning

As Actor

- 2009: His Name Was Jason: 30 Years of Friday the 13th (Documentary film) - Himself
- 2013: Crystal Lake Memories: The Complete History of Friday the 13th (Documentary film) - Himself, posthumous role
