= Mark Thomas McGee =

Mark Thomas McGee (born 1947 in San Gabriel, California) is a screenwriter and author. Most of his movie work was for Fred Olen Ray and Jim Wynorski. Although he played bit parts in some of these movies, he is not an actor and has been confused with a Mark McGee who actually is an actor. When he was in high school, Mark teamed with Dennis Muren and David Allen to make The Equinox ... A Journey into the Supernatural, released to theaters in an altered version by producer Jack H. Harris.

He is also the author of a number of books on motion pictures, mostly concerning low budget movies and their makers. He is retired and living in Palm Desert where he continues to write books.

He wrote a book on Roger Corman and told Corman that he wanted to write a script for him. McGee did drafts of Sorority House Massacre II (1989) that were not used. He also wrote an unused script for Joe Solomon and did a week's work on the script for Transylvania Twist with Jim Wynorski. He was fired at the behest of Roger Corman. However, when Wynorski hired MgGee to work on the script for Hard to Die, Corman did not object.

== Select screenplay credits ==
- Equinox (1970)
- Bad Girls from Mars (1990)
- Hard to Die (1990)
- Inner Sanctum (1991)
- Stepmonster (1993)
- Sins of Desire (1993)
- Mind Twister (1994)
- Possessed by the Night (1994)
- Sorceress (1995)
- Witch Academy (1995)

== Select books ==
- J. D. Films: Juvenile Delinquency in the Movies with R.J. Robertson (1982)
- Fast and Furious: The Story of American International Pictures (1984)
- The Little Shop of Horrors Book with John McCarty (1988)
- Faster and Furiouser: Revised and Fattened Fable of American International Pictures (1996)
- Roger Corman: The Best of the Cheap Acts (1998)
- Beyond Ballyhoo: Motion Picture Promotion and Gimmicks (2001)
- The Rock and Roll Movie Encyclopedia of the 1950s (2002)
- Invasion of the Body Snatchers: The Making of a Classic (2012)
- You Won't Believe Your Eyes: A Front Row Look at the Sci-Fi Horror Films of the 50s (2013) with R.J. Robertson
- Talk's Cheap, Action's Expensive - The Films of Robert L. Lippert (2014)
- Katzman, Nicholson, Corman Shaping Hollywood's Future (2016)

Bullets Are My Business (2021) Novel
