= A Very Special Favor =

1965 film by Michael Gordon

- Theatrical poster
- Directed by: Michael Gordon
- Written by: Stanley Shapiro; Nate Monaster
- Produced by: Stanley Shapiro
- Starring: Rock Hudson; Leslie Caron; Charles Boyer
- Cinematography: Leo Tover
- Edited by: Russell F. Schoengarth
- Music by: Vic Mizzy
- Production companies: The Lankershim Company; Gibraltar Productions
- Distributed by: Universal Pictures
- Release date: August 14, 1965
- Running time: 105 minutes
- Country: United States
- Language: English
- Box office: $1,750,000

A Very Special Favor is a 1965 American romantic comedy film directed by Michael Gordon and starring Rock Hudson and Leslie Caron. The film was co-produced by Hudson's Gibraltar Productions and Shapiro's Lankershim Company.

== Plot ==
Paul Chadwick (Hudson) is a wealthy American oilman who is in a Parisian court, where he is up against the opposing lawyer Michel Boullard (Charles Boyer). Paul wins the case, but only by seducing the judge, who happens to be a woman. Shortly after, Boullard sets out to New York, where he plans on reuniting with his daughter Lauren (Caron), whom he has not seen for over 25 years, since his American wife divorced him for flirting with another woman. On the plane, he meets Paul, to whom he complains about having lost because of his charm, a French quality. Paul apologizes for having hurt his French pride and offers a favor in return.

In New York, Boullard is shocked to find out that Lauren has become an intimidating career woman, working as a psychologist. Despite her engagement to Arnold Plum, a pushover who lives to serve his fiancée, Boullard is convinced that she an old spinster at just 30 years old. Instead of revealing his identity, he decides to help her from a distance. He contacts Paul to have an affair with her, to open up her mind to passion, rather than her career. Paul would be the perfect man for the deed: he is the ultimate womanizer. One woman comes in each day to cook for him, the other is happy to wash his clothes.

Initially, Paul is reluctant to help out Boullard, suspecting that Lauren is less than attractive, but because he notices that Boullard is suspicious of why he really won the case, he decides to help him out. To grow closer to her, he poses as her patient, telling her that he is irresistible to women and that he is too afraid to turn down a woman, because it led to suicide in the past. The relationship between the two is at first strictly professional, until one night they go out to a restaurant, an event with which Lauren tries to prove that he can enjoy a night out without worrying about women flirting with him.

Before the night is over, Lauren passes out from drinking too much champagne, and Paul brings her back to her hotel and creates a scene, which makes it looks as if they have slept with each other. The next morning, Lauren is freaked out, but she later finds out that the setting was staged. At that moment, Boullard reveals his identity to her, and together they come up with a plan to get back at Paul. She comes up with a Spanish lover and tells all about him to Paul, which shatters his ego. He goes out on a drinking spree and uses the help of a switchboard operator (Nita Talbot) — who falls in love with a chauffeur (Larry Storch) in the process — to make Lauren jealous. They succeed, and Paul and Lauren are finally brought together. In the end, they are married, and the parents of several children.

== Cast ==
- Rock Hudson as Paul Chadwick
- Leslie Caron as Dr. Lauren Boullard
- Charles Boyer as Michel Boullard
- Walter Slezak as Etienne
- Dick Shawn as Arnold Plum, Lauren's fiancé
- Larry Storch as Larry, the taxi driver
- Nita Talbot as Mickey, the switchboard operator
- Norma Varden as Mother Plum
- George Furth as Pete

== Production ==
During production, Rock Hudson openly complained about "sex comedies" such as A Very Special Favor: "I think the public is weary. The cycle has been pushed about as far as it can go, and I think light comedy is on the wane. The boundaries have been extended almost to the limit, with producers trying to see how dirty it can get. [A Very Special Favor] was filthy. I thought it was filthy when I read the script, and I still think it's filthy."

== See also ==
- List of American films of 1965
