= Raw Nerve (1991 film) =

- Raw Nerve' theatrical poster
- Directed by: David A. Prior
- Written by: David A. Prior; Lawrence L. Simeone
- Produced by: Robert Willoughby; David Winters; Mark Winters; Ruta K Aras
- Starring: Glenn Ford; Jan-Michael Vincent; Traci Lords
- Cinematography: Andrew Parke
- Edited by: Tony Malanowski
- Music by: Greg Turner
- Distributed by: Distributors Action International Pictures (AIP) (1991) (USA) (theatrical); Action International Pictures Home Video (AIP) (USA) (VHS); Echo Bridge Home Entertainment (2007) (USA) (DVD); Pyramid Film Distribution
- Release date: 1991
- Running time: 91 min.
- Country: United States
- Language: English

Raw Nerve is a 1991 film directed and written by David A. Prior. The film stars Glenn Ford in his final film role, Jan-Michael Vincent, and Traci Lords.

== Plot ==
A series of grotesque murders plagues the city of Mobile, Alabama where an unknown serial killer is killing women with a pump-action shotgun. A young race car driver, named Jimmy Clayton (Ted Prior), goes to the police where he talks with Lt. Detective Bruce Ellis (Jan-Michael Vincent) and his superior Captain Gavin (Glenn Ford) claiming that he has been having visions about the killer. Unfortunately, the police do not take him seriously, and Jimmy gets locked up as the suspect. A reporter named Gloria Freedman (Sandahl Bergman), who happens to be Ellis's ex-wife, falls in love with Jimmy and sets out prove his innocence and find the real killer.

Meanwhile, a rogue biker named Blake Garrett (Tex Cobb) learns about the murders and that Jimmy may be a suspect. He follows and accosts Gloria; telling her to stay away from Jimmy. Then Blake kidnaps Jimmy's younger sister Gina (Traci Lords) and attempts to leave the country with her, claiming that he is "protecting her". When Lt. Ellis begins to believe Jimmy's claims of innocence, he has Jimmy released and has him followed to find Blake who takes Gina to a local airport where he is attempting to leave the country with her. Thinking that Blake is the serial killer, the police chase him through the airport and in his pickup truck through the city where they corner him on a top ledge of a parking garage. When Jimmy attempts to talk to Blake, he releases Gina but drives his truck off the ledge and kills himself. When Captain Gavin finds a shotgun in Blake's truck which forensic tests prove it to be the murder weapon, the case of the "shotgun slayings" is closed. Or is it?

In the final scene, Gloria goes to Jimmy's house one evening for them go out on their first date when Jimmy begins acting strange toward her and suddenly attempts to kill her. It is revealed here that Jimmy really is the killer all along and that he committed the murders under a split-personality. Jimmy's alter ego, who is named 'Billy', murdered his and Gina's parents years earlier after they found out that Jimmy has dissociative identity disorder resulting from physical abuse by both his mother and father. Blake knew the whole time about Jimmy's D.I.D. and protected him out of blind loyalty. When Jimmy apparently discovered the truth, 'Billy' completely took over and he attempts to kill Gloria (A very similar plot twist and setting is used several years later in the 2005 thriller Hide and Seek.) After a chase through the house, just when Gloria is about to be killed, Lt. Ellis runs in and saves her by shooting Billy/Jimmy dead.

== Cast ==
- Glenn Ford as Captain Gavin
- Sandahl Bergman as Gloria Freedman
- Randall 'Tex' Cobb as Blake Garrett
- Ted Prior as Jimmy Clayton
- Traci Lords as Gina Clayton
- Jan-Michael Vincent as Lieutenant Bruce Ellis
- Red West as Dave
- Karen Johnson Miller as Paramedic
