= Sandahl Bergman =

American actress

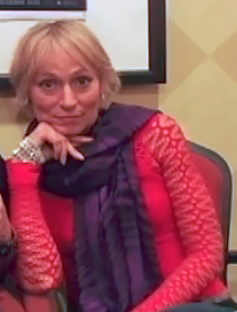
- Bergman in 2011
- Born: 14 November 1951 (age 74); Kansas City, Missouri, U.S.
- Occupations: Actress, dancer
- Years active: 1970–2003
- Height: 6 ft 0 in (1.83 m)
- Spouse: Josh Taylor (divorced)

Sandahl Bergman (born November 14, 1951) is an American actress and dancer. Trained as a dancer, she first gained recognition performing on Broadway before transitioning to film roles. She attracted early film attention for her appearance in the dance sequence “Air Erotica” in Bob Fosse’s film All That Jazz (1979). Bergman achieved wider recognition for her role as Valeria, Queen of Thieves, in the fantasy film Conan the Barbarian (1982), for which she received a Golden Globe Award for New Star of the Year – Actress.

Before her film career, Bergman appeared in several stage productions and musicals, including Broadway productions such as Pippin, A Chorus Line, and Dancin'. Known for her athletic dancing and physical screen roles, she transitioned from stage work into film during the late 1970s and early 1980s.

== Early life and family ==
Bergman was born November 14, 1951, in Kansas City, Missouri. She was raised in Shawnee Mission, Kansas. Her parents were Howard Bergman and Polly Bergman, and she had a younger sister, Nanci Lee. The family lived in Prairie Village, Kansas.

Bergman attended Shawnee Mission East High School in Prairie Village. She began studying dance at the age of five, training in classical ballet, jazz, tap, and flamenco, and later studied flamenco with dancer José Greco. She began performing at Starlight Theatre in Kansas City at age twelve and later joined a touring production of West Side Story at age sixteen.

Standing 6 ft 0 in (1.83 m), Bergman has often been described as athletic and statuesque.

== Career ==
=== Stage career ===
Bergman began performing as a dancer in Kansas City, appearing in productions at Starlight Theatre as a teenager. At age sixteen she joined a touring production of West Side Story.

Early in her career she also worked as a dancer on television variety programs including The Dean Martin Show, The Brady Bunch Hour, and Donny & Marie.

She later moved to New York City and appeared in several Broadway productions. Choreographer Bob Fosse noticed her and cast her as a replacement dancer in Pippin. She had a secondary lead in the stage version of the film Gigi in 1973, and later appeared in Mack & Mabel, and as Judy in the "new New York cast" of A Chorus Line when many of the original actors left the show in 1977.

Fosse cast Bergman again in his critically acclaimed dance concert/musical Dancin' (1978), which featured many of the leading dancers on Broadway at the time.

=== Film and television ===
Early in her career she appeared as a dancer in the film Mame (1974).

Bergman's movie career began in 1978 with a small role in the television film How to Pick Up Girls!. She followed that with the Bob Fosse film All That Jazz (1979), in which she was a featured performer in the "Take Off with Us" sequence. In the film Xanadu (1980), she appears as one of the nine immortal Muses during the opening song "I'm Alive" by ELO, as well as in the film's final title number "Xanadu".

Bergman's participation in Xanadu also led indirectly to her eviction from her apartment in New York and subsequent relocation to California. She had been subletting her apartment in New York in violation of a clause in her rental contract, and during the four months she spent in California filming the movie, her landlord became aware of the arrangement. Bergman later said she did not return to New York and instead had friends pack and ship her belongings to her.

Her best-known role is playing Valeria opposite Arnold Schwarzenegger in the fantasy film Conan the Barbarian (1982). For her performance she received the Golden Globe Award for New Star of the Year – Actress and the Saturn Award for Best Actress. Because no stunt women could be found to match her size, Bergman performed her own stunt work. Preparation for the role included extensive physical conditioning and sword training. She later recalled the demanding filming conditions, stating that she nearly lost a finger during a sword-fighting scene.

In 1983, Bergman was featured in the music video for "Heavy Metal Love" by the Canadian Hard Rock band, Helix.

In 1984 she played the title role in the post-apocalyptic comedy adventure She. The following year she appeared as Queen Gedren in Red Sonja (1985). Although she had initially been offered the title role, she chose instead to play the villain.

Bergman subsequently appeared in a number of low-budget films, including the comedy Stewardess School (1986), the post-apocalyptic film Hell Comes to Frogtown (1988), and the neo-noir film Raw Nerve (1991). Other appearances include a lunar base officer in Airplane II: The Sequel, the music video "Heavy Metal Love" by the band Helix, and the Fred Olen Ray film Possessed by the Night (1994). She also made guest appearances on television series including Hart to Hart and performed in a dance sequence choreographed by Stanley Donen in an episode of Moonlighting.

Her most recent film work came in 2003 when she appeared as a dancer in the film adaptation of The Singing Detective.

Bergman also worked as an instructor for the FIRM series of exercise videos in the 1980s.

Bergman later retired from acting but has occasionally appeared at science-fiction conventions.

== Filmography ==
=== Film ===
Year	Title	Role	Notes
1974	Mame	Dancer	Uncredited
1979	All That Jazz	Principal Dancer	
1980	Xanadu	Muse 1	
1982	Conan the Barbarian	Valeria	Golden Globe Award for New Star of the Year – Actress; Saturn Award for Best Actress
1982	Airplane II: The Sequel	Officer #1	
1984	She	She	
1984	Getting Physical	Nadine Cawley	Television movie
1985	The Ferret	Chandra	Television movie
1985	Red Sonja	Queen Gedren	Nominated—Razzie Award for Worst Supporting Actress
1986	Stewardess School	Wanda Polanski	
1987	Programmed to Kill	Samira	
1987	Kandyland	Harlow Divine	
1988	Hell Comes to Frogtown	Spangle	
1991	Raw Nerve	Gloria Freedman	
1992	In the Arms of a Killer	Nurse Henninger	Television movie
1992	Loving Lulu	Lulu	
1992	Revenge on the Highway	Python	Television movie
1994	Lipstick Camera	Lilly Miller	
1994	TekWar: TekJustice	Valkyrie	Television movie
1994	Possessed by the Night	Peggy Hansen	Direct-to-video
1994	Inner Sanctum II	Sharon Reed	
1994	Night of the Archer	Marla Miles	
1995	Ice Cream Man	Marion Cassera	Direct-to-video
1996	The Assault	Helen	
1997	Sorceress II: The Temptress	Virginia	
2003	The Singing Detective	Dancer	

=== Television ===
Year	Title	Role	Notes
1970–1973	The Dean Martin Comedy World	Golddigger	50 episodes
1978	How to Pick Up Girls!	Blond jogger	TV movie
1982	Hart to Hart	Miranda	Episode: "From the Depths of My Heart"
1986	Moonlighting	Female Dancer	Episode: "Big Man on Mulberry Street"
1988	Dirty Dancing	Delia	Episode: "Save the Last Dance for Me"
1989	Cheers	Judy Marlowe	Episode: "Send in the Crane"
1989	Hard Time on Planet Earth	Danielle Spencer	Episode: "Battle of the Sexes"
1990	Freddy's Nightmares	Ginger 'Tracker' Morgan	2 episodes
1990	Designing Women	Davida Daniels	Episode: "Nowhere to Run To"
1991	Swamp Thing	Sienna	Episode: "Tremors of the Heart"
1992	Dark Justice	Meredith	Episode: "Lead Rain"
1993	Murder, She Wrote	Sgt. Daisy Kenny	Episode: "The Petrified Florist"
1994	Silk Stalkings	Sgt. Steele	Episode: "The Scarlet Shadow"
1994	Under Suspicion	Petrella Gideon	Episode: "Serial Killer - Part 1"
1999	Sliders	Lead Female Dancer	Episode: "The Java Jive"
