= Sydney Lassick =

American actor (1922–2003)

- Born: July 23, 1922; Chicago, Illinois, U.S.
- Died: April 12, 2003 (aged 80); Los Angeles, California, U.S.
- Resting place: Mount Sinai Memorial Park Cemetery
- Other name: Sidney Lassick
- Occupation: Actor
- Years active: 1958–2000
- Notable work: Charlie Cheswick in One Flew Over the Cuckoo's Nest (1975); Mr. Fromm in Stephen King's Carrie (1976); Ernest Keller in The Unseen (1980); Luke Gutchel in Alligator (1980); Roscoe in Cool as Ice (1991)

Sydney Lassick (July 23, 1922 – April 12, 2003) was an American character actor perhaps best known for his role as Charlie Cheswick in the feature film One Flew Over the Cuckoo's Nest. Lassick's first name was sometimes spelled Sidney.

== Biography ==
He was born in Chicago, Illinois, to Russian Jewish immigrants. Lassick, who served in the U.S. Navy during World War II, and afterwards studied drama at DePaul University, began acting in both films and TV shows in the late 1950s.

Lassick is perhaps best known for his portrayal of Charlie Cheswick, a whiny and childish manic depressive patient in the 1975 Academy Award-winning film One Who Flew Over the Cuckoo's Nest. Other memorable roles include a fey Fairy Godfather in the lowbrow Sinderella and the Golden Bra; Mr. Fromm, the spitefully sarcastic English teacher in the 1976 film adaptation of Stephen King's novel Carrie; the perverse and abusive innkeeper Ernest Keller in slasher horror The Unseen; the slimy Charlie P. in the cult film Sonny Boy; and the effeminate lackey Gopher in Deep Cover (1992). Lassick also was the voice of Straycatcher #2 in the 1992 animated feature film Tom and Jerry: The Movie.

In television, Lassick guest starred on such shows as Eight Is Enough, Baretta, Hawaii Five-O, Barney Miller, Matt Houston, Moonlighting, Night Court, Knots Landing, Dream On and The X-Files. While usually a supporting actor, he played the lead in an episode of Amazing Stories called "Remote Control Man".

== Death ==
Lassick died of complications of diabetes at age 80 in Midway Hospital in Los Angeles, California. Lassick was buried at Mount Sinai Memorial Park Cemetery in Los Angeles, California. His grave marker is a simple small stone memorial showing only his name and the Star of David.

== Filmography ==
Lassick's filmography
Year	Title	Role	Notes
1958	The Bonnie Parker Story	Scout Master	
1959	Paratroop Command	Interpreter	
1959	Al Capone	Hot Dog Vendor	Uncredited
1964	Sinderella and the Golden Bra	Fairy Godfather	As Sid Lassick
1975	One Flew Over the Cuckoo's Nest	Charlie Cheswick	
1976	Carrie	Mr. Fromm	
1977	The Happy Hooker Goes to Washington	Percy Bowlder	
1977	The Billion Dollar Hobo	Mitchell	
1978	China 9, Liberty 37	Sheriff's friend	
1979	Hot Stuff	Hymie	
1979	Skatetown, U.S.A.	Murray	
1979	1941	Salesman	Uncredited
1980	Alligator	Luke Gutchel	As Sidney Lassick
1980	The Unseen	Ernest Keller	
1981	History of the World: Part I	Applecore Vendor	
1982	Pandemonium	Man in Bus Station	
1982	Partners	Photo Shoot Assistant	Uncredited
1982	Fast-Walking	Ted	
1982	Forty Days of Musa Dagh	Osman	
1984	Silent Madness	Sheriff Liggett	
1984	Night Patrol	Peeping Tom	As Sidney Lassick
1984	Monaco Forever	American Tourist	
1985	Stitches	Sheldon Mendlebaum	
1986	Ratboy	Lee 'Dial-A-Prayer'	
1987	Body Slam	Shapiro	
1988	Lady in White	Mr. Lowry	
1988	The Further Adventures of Tennessee Buck	Wolfgang Meyer	
1989	Sonny Boy	Charlie P.	
1989	Out on Bail	Otis T. Smiley	
1989	Curse II: The Bite	George	
1989	Tale of Two Sisters	Dad	
1989	Judgement	Dr. Henry Silver	
1990	Pacific Palisades	Mr. Beer	
1990	Smoothtalker	Mr. Nathan	
1990	Wishful Thinking	Dr. Harding	
1991	Committed	Gow	
1991	Don't Tell Mom the Babysitter's Dead	Franklin	
1991	The Art of Dying	Wallie	
1991	Shakes the Clown	Peppy the Clown	
1991	Cool as Ice	Roscoe	
1992	Deep Cover	Gopher	
1992	Judgement	Dr. Henry Silver	
1992	Miracle Beach	Tooth Fairy	
1992	Tom and Jerry: The Movie	Straycatcher #2	Voice
1993	Eye of the Stranger	Oli	
1993	Sister Act 2: Back in the Habit	Competition Announcer	
1994	Future Shock	Mr. Johnson	
1996	Freeway	Woody Wilson	
1996	Johns	Al	
1996	Squanderers	Peter Chisholm	
1997	American Vampire	Bruno	
1999	Man on the Moon	Crystal Healer	
2000	Something to Sing About	Elderly Man	Final film role

== Television ==
Year	Title	Role	Notes
1976	Serpico	Goldman	Episode: "The Deadly Game"
1976	Family	Benson Margotte	2 episodes
1977	Bunco		TV movie
1977	Man from Atlantis	Smith	Episode: "The Hawk of Mu"
1977	Eight Is Enough	Mr. Kaminsky	Episode: "Dark Horse"
1977	Baretta	Davey Scafali	"Who Can Make the Sun Shine?"
1977	Tabitha	Warlock	Episode: "What's Wrong with Mister Right?"
1978	Hawaii Five-O	Benilea	Episode: "Invitation to Murder"
1978	Kaz		Episode: "Which Side Are You On?"
1978	Greatest Heroes of the Bible	King Agadiz	Miniseries
1978-1980	Barney Miller	Mr. Cummings/Victor Carse	2 episodes
1979	The Cracker Factory	Ernie	2 episodes
1981	Archie Bunker's Place	Sid	2 episodes
1983	Gloria	Dr. Montego	Episode: "Class Struggle"
1983	Matt Houston	Brady	Episode: "Needle in a Haystack"
1984	Night Court	Leo	Episode: "Pick a Number"
1985	Amazing Stories	Walter Poindexter	Episode: "Remote Control Man"
1986	Moonlighting	Neighbor	Episode: "The Bride of Tupperman"
1991	Gabriel's Fire	Liebowitz	Episode: "One Flew Over the Bird's Nest"
1992	On the Air	Mr. Zoblotnick	2 episodes
1994	Dream On	Mr. Janovic	Episode: "Martin Tupper in 'Magnum Farce'"
1997	The X-Files	Chuck Forsch	Episode: "Elegy"
