= Witch Academy =

- Film poster
- Directed by: Fred Olen Ray
- Written by: Mark Thomas McGee
- Starring: Priscilla Barnes, Veronica Carothers, and Robert Vaughn
- Cinematography: Gary Graver
- Release date: 1995
- Country: United States
- Language: English

Witch Academy (aka Little Devils) is a 1995 American comedy horror film directed by Fred Olen Ray and starring Priscilla Barnes, Veronica Carothers, and Robert Vaughn.

It was written by Mark Thomas McGee and shot by Gary Graver. Ray said it was the last of his "scream queen" films as the bottom was about to drop out of that market.

== Plot ==
Leslie is a new student at college and she is harassed by other girls at her sorority. She is soon possessed by demonic forces that help her revenge.

== Cast ==
- Priscilla Barnes as Edith
- Michelle Bauer as Tara, in her last major film appearance
- Veronica Carothers as Leslie / Becky
- Ruth Collins as Darla
- Don Dowe as Neal
- John Henry Richardson (credited as Jay Richardson) as Professor Lamar
- Robert Vaughn as The Devil
- Steve Controneo as The Devil In Make-Up (uncredited)
- Ron Pardina as “Monster” (uncredited)

== Home video ==
A Blu-ray version was released in 2022.

== Reception ==
A retrospective review stated that "Fred Olen Ray loves his bottle films (a film that takes place in one location) and Witch Academy might be his best." Another commentator found that the only comment they can make about the film is praise Vaughn's performance.
