= John Vernon =

Canadian actor (1932–2005)

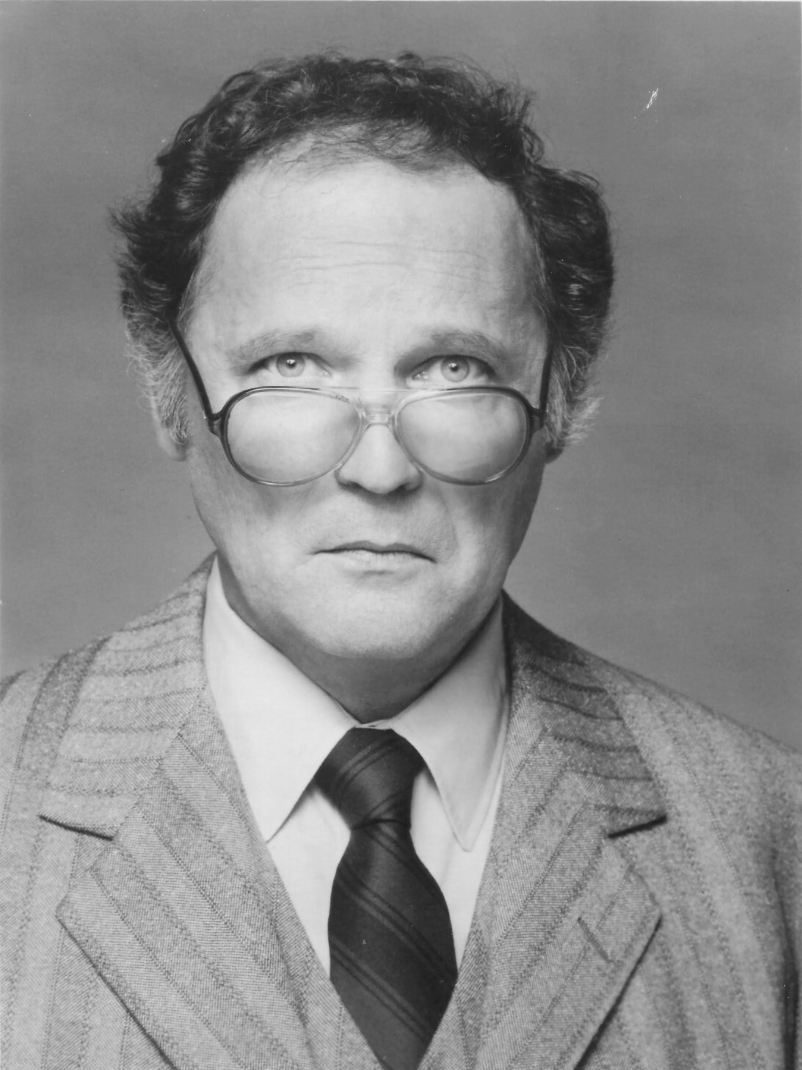
- Vernon in Delta House, 1979
- Born: Adolphus Raymondus Vernon Agopsowicz; 24 February 1932; Zehner, Saskatchewan, Canada
- Died: 1 February 2005 (aged 72); Los Angeles, California, U.S.
- Education: Banff School of Fine Arts; Royal Academy of Dramatic Arts
- Occupations: Actor, voice actor
- Years active: 1956–2005
- Spouse: Nancy West (divorced)
- Children: 3, including Kate and Nan

John Keith Vernon (born Adolphus Raymondus Vernon Agopsowicz; 24 February 1932 – 1 February 2005) was a Canadian actor. He made a career in Hollywood films after achieving initial television stardom in Canada, and was known for his roles as villainous authority figures.

His best-known film roles included the Mayor in Dirty Harry (1971), Fletcher in The Outlaw Josey Wales (1976), and Dean Wormer in Animal House (1978). In his later career, he provided voiceover work in many animated productions and video games, such as mob boss Rupert Thorne on Batman: The Animated Series and General Thunderbolt Ross on The Incredible Hulk. In 1966, Vernon provided the voices of Iron Man, Namor the Sub-Mariner, and Major Glenn Talbot in the animated television series The Marvel Super Heroes.

== Early life and education ==
Born as Adolphus Raymondus Vernon Agopsowicz in Zehner, Saskatchewan, Vernon was one of two sons of Adolf Agopsowicz, a grocer, and his wife Eleonore Krückel (also spelled as Kriekle or Kriekel). Both his parents' families emigrated to the Edenwold district in the late 19th century from the Austrian crownland and duchy of Bukovina. The Agopsowicz family was part of the Armenian community in Poland. Vernon was of Armenian, German, and Polish descent.

Raised Catholic, from 1935 to 1953, he attended St. Joseph's School and Campion College in Regina, Saskatchewan, where his acting career began under the direction of the Rev. Arthur Nelson and S.J. and Mary Ellen Burgess at the Regina Little Theatre. Vernon was educated at the Banff School of Fine Arts and the Royal Academy of Dramatic Art in London before becoming a live stage actor for CBC Television's dramatic programs.

== Career ==
=== Early roles ===
Vernon made his film debut in 1956 as the voice of Big Brother in Michael Anderson's film version of George Orwell's 1984 starring Edmond O'Brien. He returned to Canada afterwards, and gained experience by appearing on the TV series The Adventures of Tugboat Annie and The Last of the Mohicans. He also performed on stage with Crest Theatre in Toronto in the 1959-60 season, appearing in The Matchmaker, Under Milk Wood, Mrs. Gibbon's Boys, Macbeth, You Can't Take It With You, The Schoolmistress and Heartbreak House.

He debuted on Broadway in 1964 as DeSoto opposite Christopher Plummer and David Carradine in The Royal Hunt of the Sun. During the Golden Age of CBC Drama in the 1960s, he co-starred in Edna O'Brien's A Cheap Bunch of Nice Flowers, opposite Colleen Dewhurst; and in Uncle Vanya, opposite William Hutt and Rita Gam.

Starting in 1966, Vernon played the crime-fighting medical examiner Dr. Steve Wojeck in the CBC TV series Wojeck. It was an instant critical success, and also quickly became the most popular Canadian-produced dramatic series aired at the time. However, due to budget constraints, it ran sporadically, and the CBC could not promise that Wojeck would continue for more than a few episodes at a time. As well, the pay rate for the cast was far less than an American series could offer. With TV work proving precarious, and the Canadian film industry essentially nonexistent at the time, by the end of 1967, Vernon decided to go to the United States to further his acting career.

In 1967, he appeared opposite Lee Marvin in Point Blank.

In 1969, he played Cuban revolutionary Rico Parra in Alfred Hitchcock's Cold War-era spy film Topaz. He appeared on The High Chaparral as the leader of a group of striking Irish miners (1969) in "No Irish Need Apply".

In 1970, he guest-starred in the Hawaii Five-O episode "Force Of Waves" as Cal Anderson, and he appeared in the two-part episode "The Banker" of The Silent Force in 1971. In the late 1960s and early 1970s, he made four appearances over five years on the TV series Mission: Impossible as four different lead villains. In 1974, Vernon turned in a supporting performance in Mary Jane Harper Cried Last Night.

In 1971, he played the by-the-book mayor of San Francisco, perpetually frustrated by Clint Eastwood, in the first Dirty Harry film. He later parodied this role in the film One More Train to Rob and the premiere episode of Sledge Hammer!.

In 1974, he completed a season at the Royal Shakespeare Theatre in Stratford-upon-Avon, England, playing Malvolio.

In 1974, he co-starred in the film The Black Windmill with Michael Caine and Donald Pleasence. Also in 1974, he appeared in The Questor Tapes.

In 1976, he played Fletcher in Eastwood's The Outlaw Josey Wales.

In 1977, he played the husband in the Italian film A Special Day, with Sophia Loren and Marcello Mastroianni.

=== Villains ===
In 1972, he appeared as a villain in Fear Is the Key and in 1973, Vernon appeared in Charley Varrick, as a sketchy banker with a bigtime mob connection, Maynard Boyle.

In 1975, Vernon portrayed Chicago gangster Ben Larkin in the John Wayne film Brannigan, which was set in London, England, starring alongside Wayne and Richard Attenborough.

Vernon played Dean Vernon Wormer of fictional Faber College in 1978's Animal House (a role that he would reprise in the short-lived television sequel Delta House). He also played Mr. Prindle in 1980's Herbie Goes Bananas, Ted Striker's psychiatrist Dr. Stone in 1982's Airplane II: The Sequel (having appeared in a small role in the original 1956 television play on which Airplane! had been based, Flight into Danger), and Sherman Krader in 1987's Ernest Goes to Camp.

In 1979, Vernon played villainous American bigot Jonathon Pritts in New Mexico, who was trying to steal the land from Mexican landowners in the Louis L'Amour story of The Sacketts.

In 1980, Vernon made a guest appearance in the TV series The Littlest Hobo, playing the cruel hunter Sam Burrows.

He also appeared in several cult exploitation and action films in the 1980s, most notably Chained Heat and Savage Streets, both starring Linda Blair, and Jungle Warriors, opposite Sybil Danning. He underplayed his villain image (playing a character called "Mr. Big") in the 1988 Blaxploitation spoof I'm Gonna Git You Sucka: a character thinks Vernon should be "above exploitation films" and Vernon replies that many famous actors have done exploitation films, listing Jamie Lee Curtis, Angie Dickinson, and Shelley Winters as examples.

Vernon played Ted Jarrett in the season-two The A-Team episode "Labor Pains" (1983). Vernon also played Cameron Zachary in the season-two Knight Rider episode "A Good Knight's Work" (1984). He appeared in three episodes of The Fall Guy, as Carson Connally in the season-two episode "Just a Small Circle of Friends" (1983), as Ellis in the season-three episode "Boom" (1984), and as Mardovitch in the season-four episode "High Orbit" (1985). Vernon later played John Bradford Horn in the season-three Airwolf episode "Discovery" (1986).

In 1986, he played the principal in Fuzz Bucket. He played Sergeant Curt Mooney in Killer Klowns from Outer Space, and was a lead in the short-lived 1990s series Acapulco H.E.A.T. In 1995, he appeared on Walker, Texas Ranger in the episode "Final Justice", in which he played Clint Murdock, a criminal who murdered Cordell Walker's (Chuck Norris) parents when the latter was a kid, and he also served as Walker's arch nemesis in the episode.

Vernon guest-starred as the grouchy principal Dinkler in "Brad to Worse", an episode of Duckman on USA Network.

=== Voice work ===
Vernon also did voice work, including voicing Iron Man and Namor in The Marvel Super Heroes, Rupert Thorne in Batman: The Animated Series, Thunderbolt Ross in The Incredible Hulk series, and Shao Kahn in Mortal Kombat: Defenders of the Realm.

== Personal life ==
Vernon was married to and later divorced Nancy West. The couple had three children; actress Kate Vernon, musician Nan Vernon, and actor Chris Vernon.

=== Death ===
Vernon died of complications following heart surgery on February 1, 2005, in Westwood, Los Angeles at the age of 72.

== Selected filmography ==
- 1984 (1956) as Big Brother (uncredited)
- Nobody Waved Good-bye (1964) as Lot Supervisor
- Point Blank (1967) as Mal Reese
- Bonanza (1968 TV) as Yonder Man
- Justine (1969) as Nessim
- Tell Them Willie Boy Is Here (1969) as George Hacker
- Topaz (1969) as Rico Parra
- Mission Impossible (1969–1972) as Colonel Josef Strom, General Ramon Sabattini, Ramone Fuego, Norman Shields
- One More Train to Rob (1971) as Timothy Xavier Nolan
- Face-Off (1971) as Fred Wares
- Dirty Harry (1971) as The Mayor
- Bearcats! (1971) as Jason Ryker in episode 1, "The Devil Wears Armor"
- Journey (1972) as Boulder Allin
- Fear Is the Key (1972) as Vyland
- Cannon (1972–1975), 2x14 "Hard Rock Roller Coaster", 3x07 "Night Flight To Murder", 4x19 "The Set Up", 5x13/14 "The Star"
- Six Million Dollar Man: The Solid Gold Kidnapping (1973) as Julian Peck
- Charley Varrick (1973) as Maynard Boyle
- Hunter (1973) as David Hunter
- More Joy in Heaven (1973) as Kip Caley
- The Questor Tapes (1974) as Geoffrey Darrow
- Sweet Movie (1974) as Aristote Alplanalpe, a.k.a. M. Kapital
- The Black Windmill (1974) as McKee
- W (1974) as Arnie Felson
- Brannigan (1975) as Larkin
- Gunsmoke (1975) as Oliver Harker
- Swiss Family Robinson (1975) as Charles Forsythe
- The Outlaw Josey Wales (1976) as Fletcher
- Drum (1976) (scenes deleted)
- A Special Day (1977) as Emanuele, the husband of Antonietta
- The Uncanny (1977) as Pomeroy (segment "Hollywood 1936")
- Golden Rendezvous (1977) as Luis Carreras
- Angela (1978) as Ben Kincaid
- National Lampoon's Animal House (1978) as Dean Vernon Wormer
- It Rained All Night the Day I Left (1980) as Killian
- Fantastica (1980) as Jim McPherson
- Herbie Goes Bananas (1980) as Prindle
- The Kinky Coaches and the Pom Pom Pussycats (1981) as Coach 'Bulldog' Malone
- Airplane II: The Sequel (1982) as Dr. Stone
- Curtains (1983) as Jonathan Stryker
- Chained Heat (1983) as Warden Bacman
- Jungle Warriors (1984) as Vito Mastranga
- Knight Rider (1984) as Cameron Zachary
- Savage Streets (1984) as Principal Underwood
- The Blood of Others (1984) as Charles
- Fraternity Vacation (1985) as Chief Ferret
- Doin' Time (1985) as Big Mac
- Rat Tales (1986)
- Terminal Exposure (1987) as Mr. Karrothers
- Ernest Goes to Camp (1987) as Sherman Krader
- Blue Monkey (1987) as Roger Levering
- Dixie Lanes (1988) as Elmer Sinclair
- Killer Klowns from Outer Space (1988) as Curtis Mooney
- Deadly Stranger (1988) as Mr. Mitchell
- Two Men (1988) as Alex Koves
- Office Party (1988) as Mayor
- I'm Gonna Git You Sucka (1988) as Mr. Big
- War of the Worlds (1988) as General Wilson
- Afganistan - The last war bus (L'ultimo bus di guerra) (1989) as Ken Ross
- Mob Story (1989) as Don "Luce" Luciano
- Object of Desire (1990)
- The Naked Truth (1992) as Von Bulo
- Malicious (1995) as Detective Pronzini
- The Gnomes' Great Adventure (1995) as Omar / Master Ghost (voice)
- Stageghost (2000) as Slim
- Sorority Boys (2002) as Old Man
- Welcome to America (2002) as Det. Golding

=== Animation ===
List of voice performances in films
Year	Title	Role	Notes
1981	Heavy Metal	Prosecutor	Segment: "Captain Sternn"
2003	Batman: Mystery of the Batwoman	Rupert Thorne	Direct-to-video
2008	Delgo	Nohrin Judge	Posthumous release; final film role

List of voice performances in television
Year	Title	Role	Notes
1966	The Marvel Super Heroes	Iron Man, Namor, Glenn Talbot	
1986	Wildfire	Wildfire	13 episodes
1992–94	Batman: The Animated Series	Rupert Thorne	9 episodes
1992	Dinosaurs	Mr. Ashland	Episode: "Power Erupts"
1993	SWAT Kats: The Radical Squadron	Rex Shard	Episode: "Chaos in Crystal"
1994	Fantastic Four	Doctor Doom	Episodes: "The Mask of Doom"
1995	Pinky and the Brain	Admiral	Episode: "Das Mouse"
1996	Mortal Kombat: Defenders of the Realm	Shao Kahn	3 episodes
1996	Spider-Man: The Animated Series	Doctor Strange	Episode: "Doctor Strange"
1994	Duckman	Principal Dinkler	Episode: "From Brad to Worse"
1996–97	The Incredible Hulk	Thunderbolt Ross	14 episodes
1998	Pinky, Elmyra & the Brain	Principal Cheevers	Episode: "Gee, Your Hair Spells Terrific"
2000	Pigs Next Door	Grand Porcinus	Episode: "Hog Island"; uncredited
2003–2005	The Grim Adventures of Billy & Mandy	Dean Toadblatt	3 episodes

List of voice performances in video games
Year	Title	Role	Notes
1994	The Adventures of Batman & Robin	Rupert Thorne	
1995	Shannara	Troll Guard	
2000	Command & Conquer: Red Alert 2	Tesla Trooper	
2000	Baldur's Gate II: Shadows of Amn	Goldander Blackenrock, Baron Ployer	
2000	Star Trek: Klingon Academy	Academy Communications Officer, Federation Commander	
2002	Earth & Beyond	Proconsul Dionysius Kerr	
2004	Fallout: Brotherhood of Steel	Rhombus, Glowing Ghoul	
2005	Area 51	Additional voices	
