= Sledgehammer (film) =

- DVD release cover, replicating the original VHS cover art
- Directed by: David A. Prior
- Written by: David A. Prior
- Produced by: Nicolas T. Kimaz
- Starring: Ted Prior; Tim Aguilar; Linda McGill; Sandy Brooke; John Eastman; Janine Scheer; Stephen Wright
- Cinematography: Salim Kimaz
- Edited by: Ralph Cutter
- Music by: Ted Prior; Marc Adams; Philip G. Slate
- Production companies: I & I Productions
- Distributed by: World Video Pictures, Inc.
- Release date: 1983 (United States)
- Running time: 87 minutes
- Country: United States
- Language: English
- Budget: $40,000

Sledgehammer is a 1983 independent slasher film written and directed by David A. Prior. The film tells the story of a young boy who murdered his mother and her lover with a sledgehammer. Ten years after the murder and the child's mysterious disappearance, a group of teens stay in the house for a weekend when they are terrorized by the ghost of the little boy.

Sledgehammer was one of the earliest horror films to be shot-on-video, though not the first, a distinction claimed by Boardinghouse which was released one year earlier. However, while Boardinghouse received a limited theatrical release, Sledgehammer was originally released direct-to-video. It has retained a cult following, and was re-released on DVD in 2011 by Intervision, a sub-label of cult film distributor Severin Films.

== Plot ==
In a remote house, an abusive mother locks her young son in a closet, then goes into another room to meet the man she is cheating on her husband with. The man and woman intend to abandon their respective spouses, but their plans are cut short when an unseen killer appears and murders them with a sledgehammer. The bodies are found by the authorities, with the boy presumed dead.

Ten years later, seven friends have rented out the house to party in. They are driven to the house in a van by a local mechanic, who leaves with the intent of picking them up afterwards. When night falls, Chuck convinces the others to participate in a séance to try and summon the spirits of the couple that died in the house, so they can learn who killed them. In actuality, the séance is an elaborate prank concocted by Chuck and Joey, but it succeeds in bringing forth the ghost of the missing boy, which appears as a towering man in a smiling translucent mask. The spirit murders Joey with a knife through the neck, then hides his body. The next day, it murders Jimmy and Carol while they are having sex, snapping Carol's neck and hitting Jimmy in the chest with a sledgehammer.

Discovering the fates of their friends, the remaining four teenagers decide to hold up in the house until morning, intending to set out for the nearest town afterwards. When the others fall asleep, John grabs a knife and goes off in search of the killer. He finds the boy's skull in a closet, a newspaper clipping mentioning his disappearance, and Carol and Jimmy's bodies seated at a table near a Satanic pentagram painted in blood. John is confronted by the ghost, and tries to fight it off, but is killed by a knife in the back. The phantom then corners Mary, and is found stabbing her to death by Chuck and Joni, having regressed to the form of the boy; the boy tells them that he had to kill his mother because she took him away from his father in order to continue her affair. The spirit assumes its adult form, knocks Chuck unconscious, and goes after Joni. Joni fends off the ghost long enough for Chuck to recover, and after a struggle, he grabs its own sledgehammer and bashes it in the face, seemingly defeating it.

Joni and Chuck leave the house as the sun rises. Unseen by them, the spirit of the boy watches them depart from the upstairs window.

== Cast ==
- Ted Prior as Chuck
- Linda McGill as Joni
- John Eastman as John
- Jeanine Scheer as Mary
- Tim Aguilar as Jimmy
- Sandy Brooke as Carol
- Stephen Wright as Joey
- Michael Shanahan as Lover
- Mary Mendez as Mother
- Justin Greer as The Boy
- Doug Matley as The Killer
- Ray Lawrence as The Driver

== Reception ==
DVD Talk, which awarded the film one and a half stars out of five, wrote, "A movie that could only have been made in the eighties, Sledgehammer is shot on video crap of the highest caliber, a veritable disasterpiece of a movie that anyone curious as to how low cult movies can go really ought to see for themselves. Horrible in every sense of the word and endlessly entertaining for all the wrong reasons".

DVD Verdict described it as so "innocently and consistently incompetent that it is hard not love. [sic]" They particularly noted its many prolonged slow motion shots and irritating synth-based soundtrack.

Oh, the Horror! (which gave Sledgehammer the tag "Buy it!") said, "Most will call this crap, but others will call it charming. If you're in the latter category, you will find a lot to like, as stuff like this carries a lot of nostalgic currency. And while that doesn't cover up its obvious flaws (poor acting and a non-existent plot) the feeling it exudes is distinctive."

Hysteria Lives! gave Sledgehammer two and a half stars out of five, opening its review with, "whilst this early shot-on-video oddity certainly isn't going to win any awards it is cheesy (and even sometimes a little creepy) enough fun to keep most fans of the subgenre entertained."
