= Louis Febre =

Mexican born composer

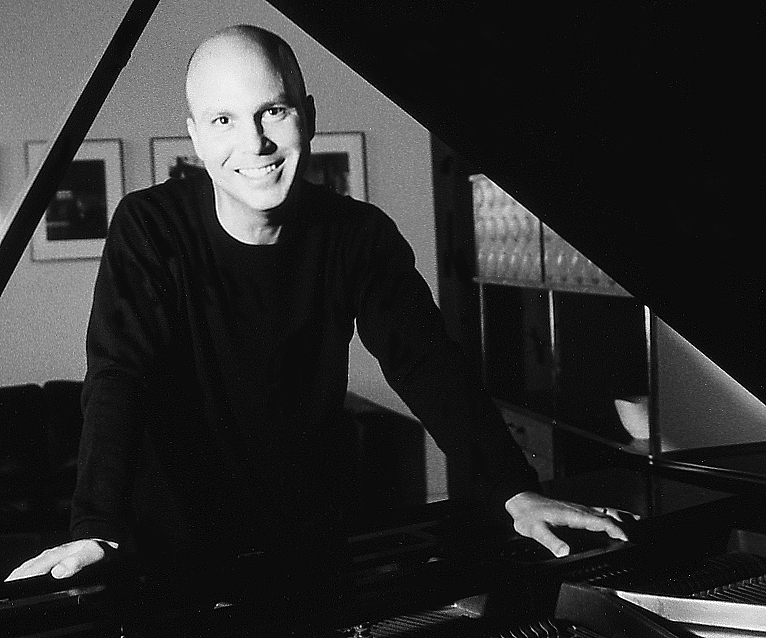

Background information
- Born: June 21, 1959 (age 65); Saltillo, Mexico
- Genres: Television score, Film scores, soundtracks
- Occupation: Composer
- Years active: 1992–present
- Website: http://louisfebre.com

Louis Febre (born June 21, 1959) is a Mexican born composer, best known for his work on the television series Smallville. He also won an Emmy Award for his score to The Cape in 1997.

== Life ==
Born in the city of Saltillo, Mexico, Febre composed his first works for the piano at age 8 while studying piano at a private academy in Northern Mexico. In 1973, his family moved to Los Angeles where he continued his study of the piano under the tutelage of Robert Turner and Françoise Régnat.

Febre went on to formal composition study with Lorraine Kimball and Frank Campo. During this period, he wrote several chamber works and other large form compositions.

He is married to Lisa Febre, a Los Angeles-area multi-instrumentalist performer and teacher.

== Career ==
In 1992, Febre was employed by B-movie company PM Entertainment, where he discovered his true compositional passion: film scoring. In 1996, he met his mentor John Debney, a partnership that would produce successful collaborative efforts such as the movie Doctor Who in 1996 and led to Louis’ first television series The Cape which would earn him an Emmy in 1997 for Best Dramatic Underscore.

Febre has enjoyed success with the movies Swimfan (2002), Tower of Terror (Disney) and a set of Scooby-Doo straight-to-video movies in 2001. He earned an Annie Award nomination for his score for Scooby-Doo and the Alien Invaders. That same year, he won a Pixie Award for the independent short film: Revenge of the Red Balloon. According to some critics, his score for Alien Trespass transcended the tepid reviews of the film itself. Variety compared it to the classic sci-fi scores of noted composer Bernard Herrmann.

In 2004, Febre collaborated with Steve Jablonsky on the first season of the hit television series Desperate Housewives. As an additional orchestrator, he worked again with John Debney on Cats & Dogs, Jimmy Neutron, the Disney film Chicken Little, Disney World Tokyo, and with Mark Snow on The X-Files (1998).

=== Smallville ===
Febre is probably best known for his work on the hit television series Smallville. With the departure of Mark Snow from Smallville, Febre became the credited composer in season seven. His score reflected the maturation of the series' protagonist, Clark Kent: "as Clark grew emotionally and intellectually more complex, [he] found a need to comment musically on his growth, and as he drew closer to his Superman persona, it became obvious that a 'Superman' theme would be required."

Febre maintains a prominent presence in the Smallville fan community. He is a featured personality on fan sites where he blogs about his process for composing for the show, and several fan magazines have published interviews with him on the subject of score composition for Smallville.

In 2011, Smallville: Score From The Complete Series Vol. 1 with Mark Snow, was released.

== Awards ==
Year	Award	Result
1997	Emmy Award - Outstanding Music Composition for a Series (Dramatic Underscore): The Cape: Pilot	Win
1998	BMI TV Music Award	Win
2001	Annie Award - Outstanding Music Score in an Animated Feature Production: Scooby-Doo and the Alien Invaders	Nomination

== Filmography ==
=== Television ===
Title	Studio
Charlie's Angels	Sony/ABC
Smallville	Warner Bros./WB
Desperate Housewives	Touchstone Television/ABC
Birds of Prey	Warner Bros./WB
The Fugitive	Warner Bros./WB
Mr. Murder	Pratchett-Kaufman/ABC
Medusa's Child	Topanga Productions/NBC
The Cape	MTM Entertainment/Syndication
Doctor Who	BBC/Universal/Fox
LA Heat	PM Entertainment

=== Feature films ===
Title	Director	Studio
Control	Tim Hunter	Millennium Films
Nine Lives	David Carson	Millennium Films
Bad Girls from Mars	Fred Olen Ray	
Swimfan	John Polson	20th Century Fox
A Woman's A Helluva Thing	Karen Leigh Hopkins	Regent Entertainment
Jack and Gord	John Comri	C3 Productions, Inc.
Hobb's End	Philip David Segal	A.V.R.I.O. Filmworks/Avrio Filmworks/Polestar Entertainment Group

=== Video feature films ===
Title	Director	Studio
Scooby-Doo and the Cyber Chase	Jim Strenstrum	Hanna-Barbera Prod.
Scooby-Doo and the Alien Invaders	Jim Strenstrum	Hanna-Barbera Prod.
Scooby-Doo! and the Witch's Ghost	Jim Strenstrum	Hanna-Barbera Prod.
The Force	Mark Rossman	Republic Entertainment
Last Man Standing	Joseph Merhi	PM Entertainment
Martial Outlaw	Karl Anderson	Image Organization
Private Wars	John Weidner	PM Entertainment
Rage	Youssef Kdiry, Joseph Merhi	PM Entertainment
Fist of Honor	Richard Pepin	PM Entertainment
Scanner Cop	Pierre David	Image Organization
Serial Killer	Pierre David	Image Organization
The Silencers	Richard Pepin	PM Entertainment
Two Bits & Pepper	Carey Michael Eubanks	Republic Pictures

=== Cable films ===
Title	Director	Studio
Time Bomb	Steven Gyllenhaal	Viacom/CBS
Cyber Seduction: His Secret Life	Tom McLoughlin	Working Title/Lifetime
3: The Dale Earnhardt Story	Russell Mulcahy	Orly Adelson Prod/ESPN
Red Water	Charles Robert Carner	Sony Pictures/TBS
Homeless to Harvard: The Liz Murray Story	Peter Levin	Patriarch Pictures / Lifetime
Christmas Rush	Charles Robert Carner	Sony Pictures TV/TBS
Dead in a Heartbeat	Dan Sackheim	Shavick Entertainment / TBS
Hidden Target	Armand Mastroianni	Columbia TriStar TV / TBS
First Target	Armand Mastroianni	Columbia TriStar TV / TBS
Nowhere to Run	Armand Mastroianni	Columbia TriStar TV / TBS
Final Run	Armand Mastroianni	Columbia TriStar TV / TBS
First Daughter	Armand Mastroianni	Columbia TriStar TV / TBS
To Love, Honor and Betray	Peter Levin	Orly Adelson / CBS
My Father's Shadow	Peter Levin	Jaffe Braunstein Films / CBS
Tower of Terror	D.J. McHale	Disney TV / ABC
The Secretary	Andrew Lane	Imagine / CBS
