= Hardcase and Fist =

- Directed by: Tony Zarrindast
- Written by: Tony Zarrindast
- Produced by: Tony Zarrindast
- Starring: Ted Prior
- Cinematography: Robert Hayes
- Music by: Matthew Tucciarone; Tom Tucciarone
- Release date: 1989
- Language: English

Hardcase and Fist is a 1989 American action film written and directed by Tony Zarindast and starring Ted Prior.

== Plot ==
When Bud McCall is indicted on a drug charge, he ends up in prison and must prove his innocence by testifying against his former police partner to put him and his gang behind bars forever.

== Cast ==
- Ted Prior as Bud McCall
- Carter Wong as Eddy Lee
- Tony Zarindast as Tony Marino
- Christina Lunde as Sharon
- Vincent Barbi as Vincent
- Maureen LaVette as Nora
- Debra Lamb as Chieko
- Angelyne as Sly Fox Dancer
- Tony Margulies as Cowboy
