= Tom DeSimone =

American film director (1939–2026)

- Born: Thomas DeSimone; July 1, 1939; Cambridge, Massachusetts, U.S.
- Died: October 17, 2026 (aged 87); Palm Springs, California, U.S.
- Education: Emerson College; University of California, Los Angeles
- Occupations: Director, writer, producer, editor

Thomas DeSimone (July 1, 1939 – October 17, 2026) was an American director, writer, producer and editor, perhaps best known for directing the cult films Chatterbox (1977), Hell Night (1981), and The Concrete Jungle (1982) and a number of pornographic films for Hand in Hand Films, a gay production studio established in the "golden age" of adult films in the early 1970s.

== Life and career ==
Thomas DeSimone was born in Cambridge, Massachusetts, on July 1, 1939. He received his bachelor's degree in directing from Emerson College in Boston and then headed West to UCLA where he earned a master's degree in Motion Picture production. Following graduation Tom worked briefly as Post Production Supervisor at Bosustow Productions in West Los Angeles.

He began his career as a director of numerous adult films in the late 1960s, including several gay pornography films under the pseudonym Lancer Brooks. His 1970 film The Collection was the first X-rated gay feature film to include dialogue and a plot while his 1971 effort Confessions of a Male Groupie or: How I Learned to Stop Worrying and Love the Electric Banana was awarded the Mama Cass award in the "Wet Dream Film Festival" in Amsterdam that same year.

Under Hand in Hand Films, DiSimone worked behind the scenes as a camera man on three of the gay porn studio's releases and directed some of his own, including Catching Up (1975) and The Idol (1979).

Chatterbox (1977), the cult musical sexcapade released by American International, was Tom's crossover film from the adult film world to mainstream Hollywood features. The film was produced by Bruce Cohn Curtis who would then hire him to direct his subsequent film Hell Night (1981), starring Linda Blair. Other films he directed include Reform School Girls, his send-up of women's prison films starring Wendy O Williams, The Concrete Jungle and the television series Freddy's Nightmares and Dark Justice.

After signing with Creative Artists Agency (CAA) he moved from features to television where the remainder of his career was spent directing episodic television for various production studios and networks including. Lorimar, Warner Bros, MGM Television, CBS Television, and the USA Network. He also did a one-year stint in Mexico City where he directed all 120 episodes of the Telenova, Acapulco Bay, for Televisa Studios.

His awards include a Golden Eagle award/Cine Film Festival for his short, Wooden Lullaby; a UCLA Film School scholarship for his film, The Game, and a Lifetime Achievement award in the 2005 Gayvn Hall of Fame. He resided in Palm Springs.

DeSimone died in Palm Springs, California, on October 17, 2026, at the age of 87. He was living with terminal cancer and chose to die with medical assistance.

== Filmography ==
=== Film ===
Year	Title	Notes
1970	How to Make a Homo Movie	As Lancer Brooks
1970	Dust Unto Dust	As Lancer Brooks
1970	The Collection	As Lancer Brooks
1970	The Upstairs Room	
1970	Inside A.M.G. (The Athletic Model Guild Story)	Documentary film
1971	Lust in the Afternoon	
1971	Assault	As Lancer Brooks
1971	Confessions of a Male Groupie	
1972	Chained	As Lancer Brooks
1972	Prison Girls	As Thomas DeSimone
1973	Swap Meat	As Lancer Brooks
1973	Sons of Satan	As Lancer Brooks
1973	Games Without Rules	As L. Brooks
1973	Black Heat	As Lancer Brooks
1973	Erotikus: A History of the Gay Movie	As L. Brooks
1973	The Classified Caper	As Lancer Brooks
1974	Duffy's Tavern	As Lancer Brooks
1974	Station to Station	As L. Brooks
1974	Everything Goes	As L. Brooks
1974	Bad, Bad Boys	As Lancer Brooks
1975	Good Hot Stuff	As Thomas DeSimone
1975	Catching Up	
1977	The Harder They Fall	As Lancer Brooks
1977	Chatterbox	
1977	Heavy Equipment	As Lancer Brooks
1978	Hot Truckin'	As Lancer Brooks
1979	Gay Guide to Hawaii	
1979	The Idol	
1979	Gettin' Down	As Lancer Brooks
1980	Wet Shorts	
1980	The Dirty Picture Show	As De Simone
1981	Hell Night	
1982	The Concrete Jungle	
1982	Skin Deep	As Lancer Brooks
1984	Savage Streets	Uncredited
1985	Bi-Coastal	As Lancer Brooks
1985	Bi-bi Love	As Lancer Brooks
1986	Reform School Girls	
1988	Angel III: The Final Chapter	
1997	Coming Distractions	As Lancer Brooks

=== Television ===
Year	Title	Notes
1988–9	Freddy's Nightmares	4 episodes
1991–2	Super Force	6 episodes
1992–3	Swamp Thing	3 episodes
1991–3	Dark Justice	17 episodes
1995	Acapulco Bay	
1996–7	The Big Easy	4 episodes
1998	Pensacola: Wings of Gold	1 episode
2002	She Spies	2 episodes

== Sources ==
- Harper, Jim (2004). Legacy of Blood: A Comprehensive Guide to Slasher Movies. Manchester: Critical Vision. ISBN 978-1-900-48639-2.
- Murray, Raymond (1998). Images in the Dark: An Encyclopedia of Gay and Lesbian Film and Video (Revised ed.). Titan Books. ISBN 978-1-840-23033-8.
- Rockoff, Adam (2011). Going to Pieces: The Rise and Fall of the Slasher Film, 1978-1986. Jefferson, North Carolina: McFarland. ISBN 978-0-786-46932-1.
