= Bad Girls from Mars =

- Directed by: Fred Olen Ray
- Screenplay by: Mark Thomas McGee; Fred Olen Ray (as Sherman Scott)
- Produced by: Fred Olen Ray; Grant Austin Waldman
- Starring: Edy Williams; Oliver Darrow; Brinke Stevens; Jay Richardson
- Cinematography: Gary Graver
- Edited by: Christopher Roth
- Music by: Louis Febre; Peter Rotter
- Distributed by: Vidmark Entertainment
- Release date: 1990
- Running time: 88 minutes
- Country: United States
- Language: English
- Budget: $19,000

Bad Girls from Mars is a 1990 American black comedy science fiction slasher film written by Mark Thomas McGee and directed by Fred Olen Ray. It stars Edy Williams, Oliver Darrow, Brinke Stevens and Jay Richardson.

== Plot ==
Someone is killing off the female leads of the movie production of Bad Girls from Mars. The producers feel they should try to finish the film, even though they're making a lucrative amount from insurance payoffs, so they fly in European sex bomb Emanuelle as the new lead. Emanuelle immediately begins embarrassing the producers by leading a wild party life around town. Meanwhile, the killings continue, and detectives try to stop the fiend responsible.

== Cast ==
- Edy Williams as Emanuelle
- Oliver Darrow as T.J. McMasters
- Brinke Stevens as Myra
- Jay Richardson as Richard Trent
- Jeffrey Culver as Mac Regan
- Bob Ruth as Al, The Cop
- Dana Bentley as Martine
- Jasae as Terry
- Al Bordighi as Ortelli
- Jerry Miller as Walt

== Production ==
Fred Olen Ray says the film had its genesis with sets left over from Roger Corman's The Masque of the Red Death. The sets were going to be torn down so Ray decided to use them for a film. A script was written, actors hired (including Russ Tamblyn) and Ray shot two days of a sword and sorcery film, Wizards of the Demon Sword. He then planned filming the rest of the film, which was completed in four days. Ray then had five days use left of the camera equipment and $19,000 left, so he decided to make another movie, which became Bad Girls from Mars. He was inspired by Hollywood Boulevard (1976) and decided to make a movie about making a movie. He says they wanted Adam West and Burt Ward so there are references to Batgirls from Mars and bat symbols in the film, but the actors were not available. Ray says it was one of the first movies to mention Ed Wood. When they started filming, it was called Emmanuel Goes to Hollywood.

== Reception ==
Bad Girls from Mars proved quite popular, being released by Lionsgate, tripling its money.

According to TV Guide, "What begins as a dirty, simple-mindedly funny sci-fi parody winds up becoming an over-extended murder-mystery spoof."
