= The Unseen (1980 film) =

1980 film by Danny Steinmann

- Theatrical release poster
- Directed by: Danny Steinmann
- Screenplay by: Michael L. Grace
- Story by: Nancy Rifkin; Danny Steinmann
- Produced by: Anthony B. Unger
- Starring: Stephen Furst; Sydney Lassick; Barbara Bach; Karen Lamm
- Cinematography: Roberto A. Quezada
- Edited by: Jonathon Braun
- Music by: Michael J. Lewis
- Production company: Triune Films (II)
- Distributed by: World Northal
- Release date: June 5, 1981
- Running time: 94 minutes
- Country: United States
- Language: English
- Budget: $2 million

The Unseen is a 1980 American slasher film directed and written by Danny Steinmann (credited as "Peter Foleg’), and starring Stephen Furst, Barbara Bach, Sydney Lassick, and Lelia Goldoni. Its plot follows three female news reporters who arrive in Solvang, California, to cover the town's annual Danish festival, and end up staying in the Victorian home of a middle-aged couple harboring a dark secret in their basement.

The film originally began with a screenplay by Michael Viner and Kim Henkel, which was significantly altered and rewritten by Steinmann and Michael L. Grace.

== Plot ==
After a hotel reservation mix up, two sisters, Karen and Jennifer, and their friend Vicki Thompson, meet a friendly but shady character named Ernest Keller, the owner of a small town museum near Solvang, California. Ernest convinces the three women into accepting an invitation for cheap room and board at his large farmhouse outside of town, where he lives with his wife Virginia. Once there, Jennifer and Karen leave for the Danish cultural festival which Jennifer is completing a story on. At the festival, Jennifer is met by her estranged boyfriend, Tony, who gets her to stay behind to talk about their relationship.

Meanwhile, back at the house, Vicki prepares to take a nap in her room, but is attacked by an unseen figure. The figure eventually begins to pull Vicki into a floor vent; when she tries to escape, the grate of the vent slams down on her neck, killing her. At the parade, Karen leaves Jennifer and Tony to talk, and makes her way back to the house alone, where she too is then attacked and killed by the unseen, as it attempts to pull her by her scarf through a vent into the basement. Virginia, who had been in the barn slaughtering a chicken, soon after comes inside to find the bodies of both Vicki and Karen, and is distraught.

When Ernest arrives back at the house, he finds Virginia in shock over the murders. It is revealed that Virginia and Ernest are, in fact, brother and sister, and that Ernest had murdered his own sadistic father over 20 years ago in order to maintain his incestuous relationship with Virginia. They keep their inbred son named "Junior" locked up in the basement, where he is often viciously beaten by Ernest. Ernest convinces the subservient Virginia that Jennifer must be killed upon her return, in order to keep everything under cover.

When Jennifer gets back that evening, she is lured into the basement by Ernest, who locks her inside. She wanders around looking for a way out, only to stumble upon Karen and Vicki's dead bodies. In a panic, she is confronted by Junior, an intellectually disabled and infantile grown man. Junior attempts to play with Jennifer, but she is frightened by his rough behavior. Ernest comes into the basement to kill Jennifer, but Virginia, having had a change of heart, attempts to stop him. Ernest attacks Virginia, but Junior, enraged by the sight, intervenes to protect his mother. Ernest kills Junior by stabbing him in the head.

Jennifer escapes the basement, pursued by Ernest. Tony, who has returned to try to rekindle his relationship with Jennifer, tries to intervene but stumbles due to his leg injury. As Ernest is about to kill Jennifer, Virginia shoots him to death. She then returns to the basement to hold Junior's corpse.

== Cast ==
- Stephen Furst as "Junior" Keller (The Unseen)
- Barbara Bach as Jennifer Fast
- Sydney Lassick as Ernest Keller
- Karen Lamm as Karen Fast
- Lelia Goldoni as Virginia Keller
- Douglas Barr as Tony Ross
- Lois Young as Vicki Thompson
- Maida Severn as Solvang Lady

== Production ==
Festival footage was shot on location in Solvang, California, in September 1979, while principal photography began in Solvang and Altadena on November 16, 1979. Filming officially completed on January 10, 1980.

== Release ==
The Unseen was released theatrically in the United States by World Northal in June 1981, first showing in Tucson, Arizona. It subsequently opened in Los Angeles on October 23, 1981.

=== Home media ===
The film was released for the first time on DVD by Prism on September 3, 2001. It was released on September 5, the following year by Digital Entertainment. It was later released as a two-disk by Code Red on July 15, 2008. Scorpion Records later released the film for the first time on Blu-ray on August 20, 2013. The company would also release the film on DVD the same day.

== Reception ==
The Unseen received little attention from mainstream critics; existing reviews of the film have been mixed. TV Guide awarded the film 2/4 stars, calling it "a vile and perverse horror film that manages to be interesting and compelling nonetheless". Donald Guarisco from AllMovie gave the film a positive review, commending its creepy atmosphere, direction, and performances of Furst, Goldoni, and Lassick. Concluding his review on the film, Guarisco wrote, "The Unseen is a nice surprise for horror fans and well worth rediscovering." Hysteria Lives! awarded the film 2.5 out of 5 stars, calling it "a genuine oddity".

== See also ==
- Horror-of-personality
- Exploitation film
- Splatter film
- Slasher film
