= Dawn Rochelle Warner =

American model, actress and entrepreneur

Dawn Rochelle
- Born: Dawn Rochelle Warner; Dexter, Kansas, United States
- Spouse: Josue Ramos (1999–2007)
- Modeling information
- Height: 5 ft 8 in (1.73 m)
- Hair color: Blonde
- Eye color: Blue
- Website: Dawn Rochelle Website

Dawn Rochelle is an American model, actress, television host and entrepreneur. She became a well-known model in the 1990s for mainstream swimwear brands and later appeared in Maxim Magazine and Playboy Lingerie. She developed a career as an actress through movies and the popular television series Walker, Texas Ranger.

Aside from acting and modeling, Warner founded the Miss Bikini United States pageant and the agency Warner Models Agency in 2008.

In 2006, she was named as one of the Sexiest Vegetarians Alive by PETA and one of the 101 Hottest Women by Maxim magazine.

In 2011, Warner became affiliated with Playboy. She was selected as one of Playboy Intimates' top 50 lingerie models of 2012.

== Personal life ==
Warner is the only child of Jeanie and Robert Warner. In 1999 she married Josue Ramos, a citizen of Spain. They later divorced but have one son, Canyon Joshua. Warner likes surfing. She and her son are avid surfers. In addition to surfing, she and her son are strict vegetarians.

== Career ==
Warner began her career at the age of 9 when she went to a commercial audition with friends and landed the role of the middle child in a commercial for ABC Broadcasting. She enjoyed the experience and began competing in beauty pageants. Her career in pageantry lead her to modeling. Her modeling career led her down two paths, one of entrepreneurship and one of film acting and corresponding.

=== Pageants ===
In her pageantry she went on to hold titles like Miss Texas Lonestar, Miss Hawaiian Tropics National Finalist, Miss US Glamour Girl, Miss Summer Nationals, and was top ten semi-finalist in the Miss Kansas USA Pageant, official preliminary to the Miss USA and Miss Universe Pageants.

=== Modeling ===
Early in her career, Warner became a swimwear model for Catalina Swimwear, Body Glove, and Cole of California Swimwear. She has done product endorsements for Pepsi and Coors Light. She later found success by working in Milan, Paris, London and the US appearing in campaigns for Adrienne Vittidini, Anne Cole, Bell Fitness, Dodge, Body Glove, Rodeo Rose, Miss Me Denim and Fortune Denim. Warner has appeared in numerous magazines including: Maxim, Esquire, Playboy Lingerie, Focus Magazine, Modern Bride Platform and South Beach Magazine.

=== Correspondent ===
Warner's hosting and correspondent credits include the "Billboard Latin Music Awards", "MLW Planet Hollywood Press Conference", "Girls Night Out- Key West" for Clear Channel Radio, and "Model Camp Las Vegas" for Univision. During the 2006 Baseball season, she was heard in Dallas/Ft Worth on KRLD (CBS Radio) as a KRLD Diva and was live at KRLD radio remotes and professional sporting events including the Texas Rangers Baseball team. She also has credits on shows for the E! Channel, ESPN, and Telemundo. She has interviewed international stars and celebrities including Enrique Iglesias, Laura Bozzo, and Donald Trump.

=== Entrepreneur ===
Dawn Rochelle founded (DRP) which has become a known entity producing beauty and fashion entertainment and events, including the Miss Bikini United States pageant at Miami Swim Week. She also founded Warner Models Agency.

== Acting ==
=== Filmography ===
Year	Film
1992	Three Days To A Kill
1993	Bikini Squad
1994	Possessed by the Night
1996	Keys to Tulsa
2014	LaBare

Dawn appears on the cover art for the movie "Three Days To A Kill".

In Keys to Tulsa she worked with Eric Stoltz, James Spader and Cameron Diaz.

She supports local up & coming film makers by appearing in independent films.

=== Television ===
Year	TV Show	Episode
1995	Walker, Texas Ranger	Deep Cover & War Zone
2007	Hottest Moms in America	
2010	The B Squad	
2011	Mother's Day Special	
2011	Dallas	
2011	Toddlers & Tiaras	Universal Royalty: The Ultimate Showdown
2021	"Miss Bikini United States”	
2021	“Rising Fashion”	

== Media recognition ==
In 2006 (20 years ago), Maxim Magazine named Warner as one of the "Hottest 101 Women in the World". That same year, PETA named her as one of the "10 Sexiest Vegetarians Alive".

In 2011 (15 years ago), Warner was selected as one of the "Top 50 Models for Playboy Intimates Lingerie of 2012".
