= Jungle Warriors =

Jungle Warriors (Euer Weg führt durch die Hölle)
- DVD Cover
- Directed by: Ernst R. von Theumer
- Written by: Robert Collector, Marc Furstenberg
- Produced by: Norbert Blecha
- Starring: Nina Van Pallandt; Paul L. Smith; John Vernon; Alex Cord; Sybil Danning; Marjoe Gortner; Woody Strode; Kai Wulff; Dana Elcar
- Distributed by: Kora-Film
- Release date: 1984
- Running time: 95 minutes
- Country: West Germany
- Language: English

Jungle Warriors, also called The Czar of Brazil (Euer Weg führt durch die Hölle, "Your Path Leads Through Hell", in Germany) is an action sexploitation film, released in the United States in November 1984. The film was shot in Mexico and the old West Germany, but recreated the scenario of a South American jungle. Though is not a well-known film, it stars—among other recognized names—Sybil Danning (a famous American B-movie actress), Dana Elcar (MacGyver's boss on the celebrated TV series) and Paul L. Smith (who appeared in movies like Midnight Express, Dune and Red Sonja). Renowned movie star Dennis Hopper had a secondary role on the film, but later was replaced by actor Marjoe Gortner.

== Plot ==
A group of eight virgin gorgeous American models take a long trip to South America, to participate in a photo session on a location deep in the jungle, apparently somewhere around Peruvian tropical forest. While flying over a cocaine plantation, their plane is shot down by Cesar, a dangerous drug lord, and the girls are taken prisoner by his army. Cesar suspects that an undercover police officer is among the models (in fact, one of the women actually is a special agent), so he orders his mercenaries to drag the girls into his dungeon for interrogation. After being tortured by Angel, Cesar's sister, and each one is cruelly gang-raped by at least twenty soldiers, the models are imprisoned in an underground cell to await Cesar's decision whether to execute them or keep them as slaves for his soldier's "entertainment". With the help of an old female servant, the models manage to escape from the basement jail and get some guns. As they make their way toward freedom, they run into a high-level Mafia meeting there in Cesar's manor. A final gunfight breaks out as the women fight to take revenge and escape alive.

The movie follows the line of sexploitation films (with a mix of Women in prison film and rape and revenge films), being a low-budget production with some nudity and rough sexual-violence. In fact, it contains a large rape scene, showing the defenseless girls tied by the wrists to the dungeon's ceiling and fences and being sadistically stripped, groped and abused by dozens of soldiers. Precisely, this strong scene made the film rated R and, consequently, couldn't aim to a mass audience. On later releases and in the edited for T.V. version, this scene has been deleted, to allow for a wider audience.

== Cast ==
- Nina Van Pallandt as Joanna Quinn
- Paul L. Smith as Cesar Santiago
- John Vernon as Vito Mastranga
- Alex Cord as Nick Spilotro
- Sybil Danning as Angel
- Marjoe Gortner as Larry Schecter
- Woody Strode as Luther
- Kai Wulff as Ben Sturges
- Dana Elcar as D'Antoni
- Suzi Horne as Pam Ross
- Mindi Iden as Marci
- Kari Lloyd as Brie Klinger
- Ava Cadell as Didi Belair
- Myra Chason as Cindy Cassidy
- Angela Robinson as Monique Rogers
- Louisa Moritz as Laura McCashin

== See also ==
- Rape and revenge
- Women-in-prison film
