= The Concrete Jungle (film) =

1982 film by Tom DeSimone

- Directed by: Tom DeSimone
- Written by: Alan J. Adler
- Produced by: Billy Fine; Mark L. Rosen
- Starring: Jill St. John; Tracey E. Bregman; Barbara Luna; Sean O'Kane; Sondra Currie
- Cinematography: Andrew W. Friend
- Edited by: Nino di Marco
- Music by: Joseph Conlan
- Distributed by: Motion Picture Marketing
- Release date: September 3, 1982
- Running time: 99 minutes
- Country: United States
- Language: English
- Budget: $700,000
- Box office: $11 million or $3.2 million

The Concrete Jungle is a 1982 American women in prison film directed by Tom DeSimone and featuring Jill St. John and Tracey E. Bregman.

== Plot ==
A woman is unsuspectingly used to carry her boyfriend's stash of cocaine in her skis and is caught by airport security. She is tried, convicted and sent to prison where she quickly learns to toughen up if she wants to survive.

== Cast ==
- Jill St. John as Warden Fletcher
- Tracey E. Bregman as Elizabeth (credited as Tracy Bregman)
- BarBara Luna as Cat (credited as Barbara Luna)
- Nita Talbot as Shelly Meyers
- June Barrett as "Icy"
- Aimée Eccles as "Spider"
- Sondra Currie as Katherine
- Peter Brown as Danny
- Carol Connors as Carol Davies
- Camille Keaton as Rita Newman
- Marcia Karr as Marcy
- Sean O'Kane as "Athlete" (uncredited)
