= SVS/Triumph Home Video =

American home video distributor

- Formerly: Sony Video Software Operations (1981–1985); Sony Video Software Company (1985–1988); SVS, Inc. (1988–1991)
- Founded: 1981; 45 years ago
- Founder: John O'Donnell
- Defunct: 1992
- Fate: Folded into Columbia TriStar Home Video
- Successor: Columbia TriStar Home Video (home video); Triumph Films (film)
- Headquarters: New York City, New York (1981–1991); Burbank, California (1991–1992)
- Parent: Sony Corporation of America (1981–1991); Columbia TriStar Home Video (1991–1992)
- Divisions: SVS Films; Fighting Fury Video; Sony Video 45; Sony Video LP; Sony Video EP; Japan Film Collection

SVS/Triumph Home Video was a home video distributor that was originally founded in 1981 as Sony Video Software Operations by John O'Donnell as a unit of Sony Consumer Products, itself a subsidiary of Sony Corporation of America. It evolved from products for Betamax to a full-fledged home video company before becoming a division of Columbia TriStar Home Video in 1991, in turn only to be eventually folded a year later.

== History ==
In 1981, Sony Corporation employer and future Central Park Media founder John O'Donnell moved from Japan to the United States and formed a unit for Sony Consumer Products, itself a subsidiary of Sony Corporation of America, called Sony Video Software Operations. The company initially started selling products and product lines for the Betamax format, and soon expanded into music programming.

The company branched out into home video production, in 1983, starting the Sony Video 45 label, followed by the Sony Video LP and Sony Video EP labels, primarily consisting of music output. The first hit on the label was Duran Duran. The company soon later expanded to titles beyond music, with The Hobbit, Curious George and The Snowman being the first key titles. The success led Sony to spin off Sony Video Software Operations into a separate company in 1984.

In 1985, Sony acquired the home video rights to the television show Voltron: Defender of the Universe and marketed it to North America as one of its first kids titles in the catalog. The success gave Sony more titles in its home video inventory, in which it also secured the rights to various John Wayne films from Fox Lorber Associates in the middle of the year. The company later changed its name to Sony Video Software Company in late 1985. The company launched a label dedicated to martial arts films, called Fighting Fury Video, in late 1985. In 1986, the company partnered with Virgin Video to bring the Virgin Music Video label to North America. The name was also used by Japanese Sony Video Software International, as well as the European Sony Video Software, which was later founded in 1986 for the European market.

The company soon made its entry into movies in 1987, initially releasing B-movies, before entering the theatrical market in 1987 with the release of the movie The Fringe Dwellers, which Sony co-distributed with Atlantic Releasing Corporation. The company made a four film partnership with Action International Pictures, to finance films for theatrical and home video release. Also that year, the company made a partnership with Rabbit Ears Productions for home video release. The company also acquired the rights to the film Spookies, also for theatrical release under the brand SVSC Films and home video release. In 1988, the company launched the line Japan Film Collection.

In mid-1988, the company reorganized its theatrical business as Sony Pictures (unrelated to Columbia Pictures Entertainment, which Sony acquired in 1989 and which was eventually renamed in 1991), and its first and only release with the name was Tiger Warsaw. In late 1988, the company name was shortened to SVS, Inc., with its film division becoming SVS Films.

The company hit big when Sony acquired Columbia Pictures Entertainment in 1989. Shortly afterwards, John O'Donnell, the head of SVS left the company to form Central Park Media in 1990. SVS' control was transitioned into Columbia Pictures in 1990. Its film production division SVS Films moved distribution operations to Triumph Releasing Corporation before folded in 1991.

When CPE was renamed as Sony Pictures Entertainment in 1991, SVS was demoted to a division of RCA/Columbia Pictures Home Video and renamed as SVS/Triumph Home Video, with the Triumph name taken from film releasing label Triumph Releasing Corporation. The New York office shuttered in favor of the Burbank office of the parent. The SVS/Triumph name was eventually dropped a year later. Triumph Films had closed down its first relaunched iteration in 1997, and its role was later taken by Screen Gems.

== Films ==
Release date	Title	Notes
August 1986	The Appointment	Distribution only; produced by First Principle Film Productions Ltd.
May 1987	Honeymoon Horror	Distribution only; produced by Omega Cinema Productions
August 1987	No Dead Heroes	Distribution only; produced by CineVentures and Maharaj-Miller Film
September 1987	The Occult Experience	Distribution only; produced by CineTel Productions
October 1987	Dirty Laundry	Distribution only; produced by Westwind
November 2, 1987	Deadly Prey	Distribution only; produced by Action International Pictures
November 1987	Mankillers	Distribution only; produced by Action International Pictures
February 1, 1988	Mirror of Death	Distribution only; produced by Mad Women Productions
February 1988	Slaughterhouse Rock	Co-distribution only with Taurus Entertainment; produced by Arista Films and First American Film Capital
February 22, 1988	Spookies	North American distribution only as SVSC Films; produced by Safir Films
March 1988	Night Wars	Distribution only as SVSC Films; produced by Action International Pictures
March 1988	Contagion	Distribution only; produced by Premiere Film Marketing Ltd. and Reef Films
July 1988	The Rejuvenator	Distribution only as SVS Films; co-production with Jewel Productions
August 1988	Nothing Underneath	Distribution only; produced by Faso Film
September 23, 1988	Tiger Warsaw	Distribution only as Sony Pictures; produced by Continental Film Group
September 23, 1988	Stones of Death	Distribution only; produced by David Hannay Productions, Premiere Film Marketing Ltd. and Medusa Communications
October 1988	Party Line	Distribution only, produced by Westwind
October 31, 1988	Phoenix the Warrior	Distribution only; produced by Action International Pictures
December 1988	Vicious	Distribution only as SVS Films; produced by David Hannay Productions, Premiere Film Marketing Ltd. and Medusa Communications
January 13, 1989	Cameron's Closet	Distribution only as SVS Films; produced by Smart Egg Pictures
January 1989	Escape from Safehaven	Distribution only as SVS Films; produced by Avalon Productions
March 3, 1989	Summer Job	as SVS Films; co-production with Gomillion Studios, Kayes and Movie Job
April 28, 1989	An Unremarkable Life	Distribution only as SVS Films; produced by Continental Film Group
June 16, 1989	Malarek	Distribution only as SVS Films; produced by Malofilm and Telescene
June 28, 1989	Out of the Body	North American distribution only; produced by David Hannay Productions, Medusa Communications and Premiere Film Marketing Ltd.
July 1989	Midnight	Distribution only as SVS Films; produced by Midnight Inc.
July 1, 1989	Underground	Distribution only as SVS Films; produced by Triangle Productions
October 1, 1989	Prime Suspect	Distribution only; produced by Premiere Pictures Corporation
October 20, 1989	The Last Warrior	Distribution only as SVS Films; produced by ITC Entertainment Group, Label Productions and Martin Wragge Productions
November 10, 1989	Best of the Best	Distributed by Taurus Entertainment, co-production with The Movie Group and Kuys Entertainment
December 8, 1989	One Man Out	Distribution only as SVS Films; produced by Expatriate Productions and SC Entertainment
April 20, 1990	Modern Love	Distributed by Triumph Releasing Corporation; produced by Lyric Films
April 28, 1990	An American Summer	Distributed by Castle Hill Productions; co-production with Boss Entertainment Group
October 12, 1990	To Sleep with Anger	Distributed by The Samuel Goldwyn Company; produced by Edward R. Pressman Film Corporation
November 9, 1990	Mister Frost	Distributed by Triumph Releasing Corporation; co-production with AAA Productions, Hugo Films and Overseas Multi Media
April 12, 1991	Eminent Domain	Distributed by Triumph Releasing Corporation; co-production with Arama Entertainment and Harlech Films
July 11, 1991	Zoo Radio	Distribution only; produced by Wells Entertainment Group
January 1992	By the Sword	Distributed by Hansen Entertainment; produced by The Movie Group, Film Horizon and Foil Productions Inc.
