= Mark Mancina =

American film composer (born 1957)

- Born: March 9, 1957 (age 69); Santa Monica, California
- Genres: Film score, television score, rock, pop, progressive rock, video game soundtrack
- Occupations: Composer, producer, arranger
- Years active: 1987–present
- Website: mark-mancina.com

Mark Mancina (born March 9, 1957) is an American film composer. A veteran of Hans Zimmer's Media Ventures, Mancina has scored over sixty films and television series including Speed, Bad Boys, Twister, Tarzan, Training Day, Brother Bear, Criminal Minds, Blood+, Planes, and Moana. He has also composed music for the PlayStation 3 game Sorcery.

He has made several collaborations with The Walt Disney Company, and has won two Grammy Awards, and was nominated for an Annie Award for Brother Bear. For his work on the Disney Theatrical Productions adaptation of The Lion King, he was nominated for a Tony Award for Best Original Score in a Musical and won a Grammy Award for Best Musical Show Album.

== Career ==
Mancina has worked primarily as a composer for Hollywood soundtracks, such as his collaboration with Trevor Rabin on the soundtrack for Con Air. He arranged many of the songs behind Disney's The Lion King (while Hans Zimmer wrote the orchestral score with Nick Glennie-Smith and Lebo M for the African chants) including the Broadway musical. He composed the score for the thriller Twister (1996) and the action films Speed (1994) and Bad Boys (1995). Mancina co-wrote several songs for Hanna-Barbera's 1990 animated film Jetsons: The Movie.

Mancina collaborated with John Van Tongeren to write the theme to the 1995 revival of The Outer Limits. They both scored ten episodes for the first season of the show. He collaborated with Phil Collins on two Disney animated feature films, Tarzan (for which soundtrack he and Collins received a Grammy Award for Best Soundtrack Album) and Brother Bear. Mancina wrote and composed the arrangement of "When You Wish Upon a Star" from 2006 to 2022 for the previous Walt Disney Pictures logo and was co-arranged with and orchestrated by David Metzger. Furthermore, he composed the music of the Disneynature logo, as well as co-composing the music of the 2013 DisneyToon Studios logo with Metzger.

Mancina composed the music for the 2005–06 anime television series Blood+, which had music produced by Hans Zimmer. Additionally in television, he composed score for Criminal Minds and Soldier Of Fortune, Inc.

Mancina has contributed to a number of progressive rock projects. He toured with Trevor Rabin in support of Can't Look Away and went on to produce tracks on the Yes album Union in 1991. He worked with Emerson, Lake & Palmer, as he coproduced their 1992 album, Black Moon, and he also wrote one song Burning Bridges on this record.

With playwright Glen Berger, Mancina has written a musical based on the film August Rush, for which he had written the score. Mancina and Berger cowrote the lyrics for the musical, with Mancina writing the music and Berger writing the book. Under the direction of John Doyle, it received its world premiere at the Paramount Theatre in Aurora, Illinois in May 2019.

Although he did not participate in the 2020 film Bad Boys for Life, his original theme for Bad Boys is used heavily throughout the film as well as the end credits.

== Personal life ==
Mancina is of Italian heritage. He resides in Carmel, California, with his wife and daughter. Trained as a classical guitarist, he is an avid guitar player and rare instrument collector.

== Discography ==
=== Film ===
==== 1980s ====
Year	Title	Director(s)	Studio(s)	Notes
1987	Mankillers	David A. Prior	Action International Pictures; Sony Pictures Entertainment	Composed with Tim James and Steven McClintock
1987	Code Name Vengeance	David Winters	Action International Pictures	Composed with Tim James and Steven McClintock
1988	Death Chase	David A. Prior	Action International Pictures	Composed with Tim James and Steven McClintock
1988	Night Wars	David A. Prior	Action International Pictures	Composed with Tim James and Steven McClintock
1988	Space Mutiny	David Winters; Neal Sundstrom	Action International Pictures	Composed with Tim James and Steven McClintock
1989	Hell on the Battleground	David A. Prior	Action International Pictures	
1989	Future Force	David A. Prior	Action International Pictures	Composed with Steven McClintock

==== 1990s ====
Year	Title	Director(s)	Studio(s)	Notes
1990	The Lost Platoon	David A. Prior	Action International Pictures	Composed with Tim James and Steven McClintock
1990	Crossing the Line	Gary Graver	Epic Productions; RCA/Columbia Pictures Home Video; VCL Communications	
1990	Days of Thunder	Tony Scott	Don Simpson/Jerry Bruckheimer Films; Paramount Pictures	As composer of additional music Score composed by Hans Zimmer
1991	Where Sleeping Dogs Lie	Charles Finch	Sotela Pictures; August Entertainment	Composed with Hans Zimmer
1993	Sniper	Luis Llosa	Baltimore Pictures; Iguana Producciones; Sniper Productions; TriStar Pictures (North America); Odyssey Entertainment (International)	As composer of additional music Score composed by Gary Chang & Hans Zimmer
1993	True Romance	Tony Scott	Morgan Creek Productions; Davis Films; A Band Apart; Warner Bros.	As composer of additional music Score composed by Hans Zimmer
1994	Monkey Trouble	Franco Amurri	Percy Main; Effe Productions; Victor Company of Japan; Ridley Scott Productions; New Line Cinema	
1994	The Lion King	Roger Allers; Rob Minkoff	Walt Disney Pictures; Walt Disney Feature Animation	As composer of additional music & choral arranger Score composed by Hans Zimmer, Tim Rice & Elton John Grammy Award for Best Musical Album for Children
1994	Speed	Jan de Bont	The Mark Gordon Company; 20th Century Fox	
1995	Man of the House	James Orr	Walt Disney Pictures; All Girl Productions; Orr & Cruickshank Productions	
1995	Bad Boys	Michael Bay	Columbia Pictures; Don Simpson/Jerry Bruckheimer Films	
1995	Assassins	Richard Donner	Silver Pictures; Donner/Shuler-Donner Productions; Warner Bros.	
1995	Fair Game	Andrew Sipes	Silver Pictures; Warner Bros. Pictures	
1995	Money Train	Joseph Ruben	Columbia Pictures; Peters Entertainment	
1996	Twister	Jan de Bont	Warner Bros. (North America); Universal Pictures (International); Amblin Entertainment	
1996	Moll Flanders	Pen Densham	Trilogy Entertainment Group; Spelling Films; Metro-Goldwyn-Mayer	
1997	Con Air	Simon West	Touchstone Pictures; Jerry Bruckheimer Films	Composed with Trevor Rabin
1997	Speed 2: Cruise Control	Jan de Bont	Blue Tulip Productions; 20th Century Fox	
1998	Return to Paradise	Joseph Ruben	Propaganda Films; PolyGram Filmed Entertainment	
1999	Tarzan	Kevin Lima; Chris Buck	Walt Disney Pictures; Walt Disney Feature Animation	Composed with Phil Collins Grammy Award for Best Score Soundtrack for Visual Media First score for an animated film

==== 2000s ====
Year	Title	Director(s)	Studio(s)	Notes
2000	Auggie Rose	Matthew Tabak	Franchise Pictures; Roxie Releasing; 20th Century Fox Home Video	Composed with Don L. Harper
2000	Bait	Antoine Fuqua	Warner Bros. Pictures; Castle Rock Entertainment	
2001	Training Day	Antoine Fuqua	Warner Bros. Pictures; Village Roadshow Pictures; Outlaw Productions	
2001	Domestic Disturbance	Harold Becker	Paramount Pictures	
2003	Brother Bear	Aaron Blaise; Robert Walker	Walt Disney Pictures; Walt Disney Feature Animation	Composed with Phil Collins Nominated- Annie Award for Best Music in a Feature Production
2003	The Haunted Mansion	Rob Minkoff	Walt Disney Pictures	
2004	The Reckoning	Paul McGuigan	Kanzaman; M.D.A. Films S.L. Renaissance Films; Columbia TriStar Film Distributors International (Spain); Entertainment Film Distributors (United Kingdom)	Composed with Adrian Lee
2005	Asylum	David Mackenzie	Momentum Pictures	
2005	Tarzan II	Brian Smith	Walt Disney Home Entertainment	Composed with Phil Collins & David Metzger; Direct-to-video
2007	Shooter	Antoine Fuqua	Paramount Pictures di Bonaventura Pictures	
2007	August Rush	Kirsten Sheridan	Southpaw Entertainment; CJ Entertainment; Warner Bros. Pictures (North America); Odyssey Entertainment (International)	Nominated- Saturn Award for Best Music
2008	Camille	Gregory Mackenzie	A-Mark Entertainment; Ruddy Morgan Productions; National Entertainment Media	
2009	Imagine That	Karey Kirkpatrick	Paramount Pictures; Nickelodeon Movies; Di Bonaventura Pictures; Goldcrest Pictures; Internationale Filmproduktion Stella-del-Sud III GmbH Ko.	
2009	Hurricane Season	Tim Story	Dimension Films; The Weinstein Company	

==== 2010s ====
Year	Title	Director(s)	Studio(s)	Notes
2013	Penthouse North	Joseph Ruben	Dimension Films (United States); Lionsgate (International); Demarest Films; TAJJ Media; Bunk 11 Pictures; Kilburn Media	
2013	Planes	Klay Hall	Walt Disney Pictures; Disneytoon Studios	Nominated- International Film Music Critics Award for Best Original Score in an Animated Film
2014	Planes: Fire & Rescue	Bobs Gannaway	Walt Disney Pictures; Disneytoon Studios	
2016	Moana	John Musker; Ron Clements	Walt Disney Pictures; Walt Disney Animation Studios	Composed with Lin-Manuel Miranda and Opetaia Foa'i of Te Vaka Nominated- Grammy Award for Best Compilation Soundtrack for Visual Media; Nominated- Hollywood Music in Media Award for Best Original Score in an Animated Film; Nominated- Hollywood Music in Media Award for Best Original Song in an Animated Film; Nominated- International Film Music Critics Award for Best Original Score in an Animated Film

==== 2020s ====
Year	Title	Director(s)	Studio(s)	Notes
2020	Bad Boys for Life	Adil El Arbi; Bilall Fallah	Columbia Pictures; 2.0 Entertainment; Don Simpson/Jerry Bruckheimer Films; Overbrook Entertainment	Credited as composer of original Bad Boys theme
2021	Cry Macho	Clint Eastwood	Malpaso Productions; Warner Bros. Pictures	
2022	The Sea Beast	Chris Williams	Netflix; Netflix Animation	
2024	Juror No. 2	Clint Eastwood	Warner Bros. Pictures; Dichotomy Films; Gotham Group; Malpaso Productions	
2024	Moana 2	Jason Hand; Dana Ledoux Miller; David Derrick Jr.	Walt Disney Pictures; Walt Disney Animation Studios	Composed score & songs with Opetaia Foa'i, Abigail Barlow & Emily Bear
2026	Moana	Thomas Kail	Walt Disney Pictures; Seven Bucks Productions	Composed score & songs with Lin-Manuel Miranda

=== Television ===
Year	Title	Notes
1992	Millennium: Tribal Wisdom and the Modern World	Documentary series; 11 episodes
1993	Taking Liberty	Television film
1993	Lifepod	Television film
1993–94	Space Rangers	6 episodes
1995–2000	The Outer Limits	18 episodes & theme music Nominated- CableACE Award for Best Score in a Series
1997	Poltergeist: The Legacy	Episode: "The Choice"
1997–98	Soldier of Fortune, Inc.	20 episodes & theme music
1998	From the Earth to the Moon	Miniseries; 1 episode
1998	Houdini	Television film
1999	The Strip	10 episodes & theme music
2005–06	Blood+	Anime; 50 episodes
2005–09	Criminal Minds	88 episodes & theme music
2006	A House Divided	Television film

=== Theatre ===
Year	Title	Notes
1997–present	The Lion King	Composed with Hans Zimmer, Tim Rice, Elton John, Lebo M, Jay Rifkin & Julie Taymor Won: Grammy Award for Best Musical Show Album; Nominated: Tony Award for Best Original Score

=== Video games ===
Year	Title	Notes
2009	Call of Duty: Modern Warfare 2	Composed with Lorne Balfe & Hans Zimmer; Additional music Nominated- BAFTA Games Awards for Best Original Score; Nominated- BAFTA Games Awards for Best Audio; Nominated- International Film Music Critics Award for Best Original Score for Interactive Media
2012	Sorcery	

== See also ==
- Category:Mark Mancina songs
