= Kimberley Casey (producer) =

American film producer

- Other names: Kimberly Casey, Kim Casey
- Occupations: Film producer Film director Actress
- Years active: 1980s to 1990s

Kimberley Casey is a film producer, film director and occasional actress who was mainly active from the late 1980s to early 1990s. The films she has produced or been part of are usually in the action, exploitation genre. Her production work includes The Bounty Hunter which starred Robert Ginty, Future Force which starred David Carradine, Lost Platoon which starred William Knight and White Fury which starred Deke Anderson and Sean Holton. A good portion of her work has been with film director, David A. Prior. She has made a notable contribution to the action, exploitation film genres during the 1980s and 1990s.

== Work ==
=== Production and directorial ===
Along with Fritz Matthews, she produced the 1989 film The Bounty Hunter which Robert Ginty both directed and starred in. Also that year another film she produced Future Force was released. It was directed by David A. Prior and starred David Carradine and Robert Tessier. This was a police film set in the future where the Los Angeles police was run by a private company. Also that year she made her directorial debut, Born Killer, which starred Ty Hardin, Ted Prior and Fritz Matthews. The film was about a group of young woman who have to join forces with a group of war gamers and a Vietnam vet to ward off an escaped psychopath and an evil sheriff. The 1990 film, White Fury was about two ruthless criminals who end up taking the occupants of a cabin hostage. She produced the 1990 documentary That's Action which was described by Variety as something like the B and C grade action version of MGM's documentary That's Entertainment. She both directed and produced the 1991 film Deadly Dancer, which was a tale about dancers in an L.A club being murdered by a psycho. It starred Smith Wordes, Walter W. Cox, Steve Jonson and Shabba-Doo. She co-produced Project Eliminator which starred David Carradine, Frank Zagarino, Hilary English and Brett Baxter Clark.

Also in 1991, the film Cop Out which she produced was released. It was written and directed by Lawrence L. Simeone. It was a story about a detective quitting the police force to pursue the men who murdered a man, a crime for which his brother was framed for.

=== Actress ===
She had a few acting roles. One was as Pat, the secretary of Dr. Campbell in the 1988 sci-fi horror film, Night Wars. In the 1989 film She-Wolves of the Wasteland, which was set in a post-apocalyptic time period she played the parts of Scratch, and Rezule Warrior. She had a part as Alicia in the film Future Force that was also released that year.

== Filmography ==
Production
| Film | Role | Director | Year | Notes # |
|---|---|---|---|---|
| The Bounty Hunter | Producer | Robert Ginty | 1989 | |
| Future Force | Producer | David A. Prior | 1989 | |
| The Lost Platoon | Producer | David A. Prior | 1990 | |
| Future Zone | Producer | David A. Prior | 1990 | |
| That's Action | Producer | David A. Prior | 1990 | Documentary |
| White Fury | Producer | David A. Prior | 1990 | |
| Lock 'n' Load | Producer | David A. Prior | 1990 | |
| Deadly Dancer | Producer | Kimberley Casey | 1991 | |
| Project Eliminator | Co-producer | H. Kaye Dyal | 1991 | |
| Cop-Out | Producer | Lawrence L. Simeone | 1991 | |

Direction
| Film | Role | Year | Notes # |
|---|---|---|---|
| She Wolves of the Wasteland | Second assistant director | 1988 | as Kimberly Casey |
| Operation Warzone | second unit director | 1988 | as Kimberly Casey |
| Hell on the Battleground | Assistant director First assistant director Second unit director | 1988 | as Kimberly Casey and as Kimberley Casey |
| Jungle Assault | First assistant director | 1989 | |
| Born Killer | Director | 1989 | |
| Deadly Dancer | Director | 1991 | |

Other
| Film | Role | Director | Year | Notes # |
|---|---|---|---|---|
| Death Chase | Production assistant | David A. Prior | 1988 | |
| Night Wars | Production coordinator | David A. Prior | 1988 | as Kimberly Casey |
| Hell on the Battleground | Director of aerial photography | David A. Prior | 1988 | |
| Deadly Reactor | Production manager | David Heavener | 1989 | as Kimberly Casey |

Actress
| Film | Role | Director | Year | Notes # |
|---|---|---|---|---|
| Night Wars | Pat, Dr. Campbell's secretary | David A. Prior | 1988 | |
| She Wolves of the Wasteland | Scratch / Rezule Warrior | Robert Hayes | 1988 | |
| Deadly Reactor | Agopy People | David Heavener | 1989 | As Kim Casey |
| Future Force | Alicia | David A. Prior | 1989 | |
| Lock 'n' Load | Woman at door | David A. Prior | 1990 | as Kimberly Casey |
