= Gail Fisher =

American actress (1935–2000)

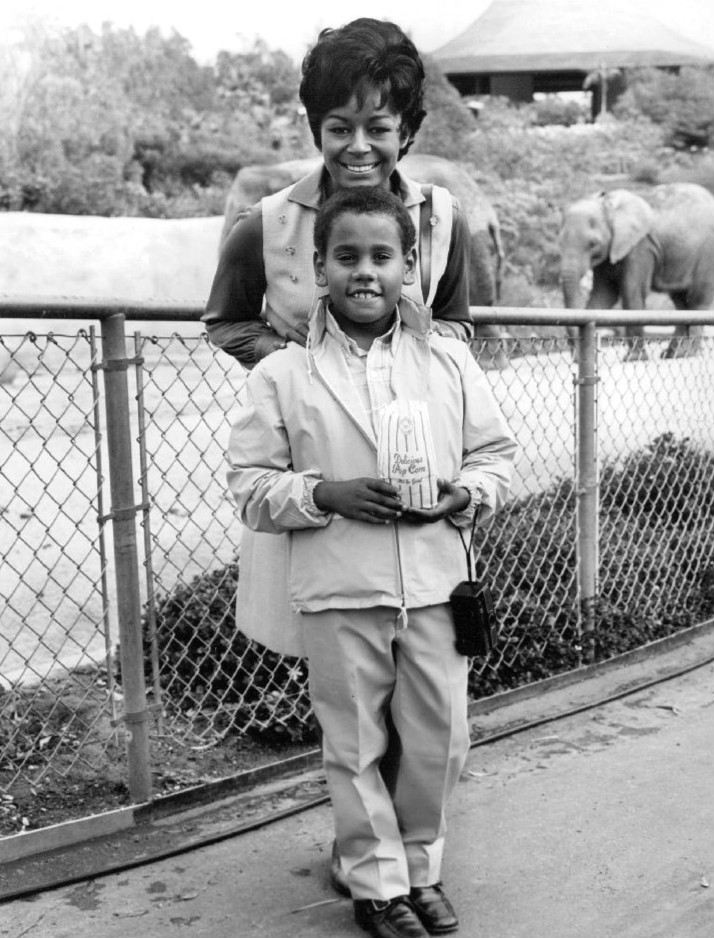
- Fisher and Mark Stewart (Mannix, 1970)
- Born: August 18, 1935; Orange, New Jersey, U.S.
- Died: December 2, 2000 (aged 65); Culver City, California, U.S.
- Occupation: Actress
- Years active: 1959–1990
- Spouses: John Levy (m. 1964; div. 1972) Robert A. Walker (m. 1973; div. 1973): Wali Muhammad (Walter Youngblood)
- Children: 2

Gail Fisher (August 18, 1935 – December 2, 2000) was an American actress who was one of the first Black women to play substantive roles in American television. She was best known for playing the role of secretary Peggy Fair on the television detective series Mannix from 1968 through 1975, a role for which she won two Golden Globe Awards and an Emmy Award; she was the first African-American woman to win those prestigious awards. She also won an NAACP Image Award in 1969. In addition to her acting career, Fisher was a successful jazz lyricist.

== Early years ==
The youngest of five children, Fisher was born in Orange, New Jersey. Her father died when she was two years old, and she was raised by her mother, Ona Fisher, who supported her family with a home-operated hair-styling business while living in the Potter's Crossing neighborhood of Edison, New Jersey. Gail graduated from Metuchen High School in Metuchen, New Jersey. During her teenage years, she was a cheerleader and entered several beauty contests, winning the titles of Miss Transit, Miss Black New Jersey, and Miss Press Photographer.

In a contest sponsored by Coca-Cola, Fisher won the opportunity to spend two years studying acting at the American Academy of Dramatic Arts. As a student of acting in New York City, she worked with Lee Strasberg and became a member of the Repertory Theater at Lincoln Center, where she worked with Elia Kazan and Herbert Blau. As a young woman, she also worked as a model.

== Career ==
Fisher made her first television appearance in 1960 at age 25, appearing in the NTA Film Network program The Play of the Week. In the same year, she appeared in a film sponsored by the US government called The New Girl in the Office, which depicted a fictional firm hiring its first African-American secretary to ensure compliance with federal contract requirements.

Also during the early 1960s, she appeared in a television commercial for All laundry detergent, which she said made her "the first Black female—no, make that Black, period—to make a national TV commercial, on camera, with lines." In 1965, Herbert Blau cast her in a theatrical production of Danton's Death.

She first appeared in Mannix during the second season, when Mannix leaves a detective firm and sets up shop as a private investigator. She became the second African American woman after Nichelle Nichols of Star Trek to show prominently on weekly television. In 1968, she made guest appearances on the TV series My Three Sons; Love, American Style; and Room 222. In 1970, her work on Mannix was honored when she received the Emmy Award for Outstanding Supporting Actress in a Drama Series, becoming the first African-American woman to do so. In 1971, Fisher became the first African-American woman to win a Golden Globe, and won her second in 1973. After Mannix was cancelled in 1975, she appeared on television about once a year, guest starring on popular shows such as Fantasy Island, Knight Rider, General Hospital, and The White Shadow.

== Songwriting ==
Fisher was also a lyricist for a number of jazz songs. With Vincent Levy, she wrote lyrics to Joe Zawinul's "Mercy, Mercy, Mercy" (first performed without lyrics by The Cannonball Adderley Quintet in 1966). The song was covered by dozens of artists. Fisher wrote lyrics for another Adderley song, "Do Do Do (What Now is Next)," with music by Nat Adderley, featured on the Cannonball Adderley Quintet's 1967 album 74 Miles Away. On the album's liner notes, critic Leonard Feather calls Fisher "the prettiest songwriter in town." Fisher also wrote lyrics for an existing jazz standard, "Stolen Moments," composed by Oliver Nelson; the vocal version was first recorded by Carmen McRae and Betty Carter on their 1987 album The Carmen McRae – Betty Carter Duets.

== Personal life ==
Fisher was married and divorced three times. She had two daughters, Samara and Jole, from her 1964 marriage to John Levy. Her marriage to Wali Muhammad (Walter Youngblood), famed cornerman to Sugar Ray Robinson and Muhammad Ali, ended in divorce when he changed religions. Wali was also an assistant minister to Malcolm X at Nation of Islam Mosque No. 7. Jet magazine reported in its July 26, 1973 issue that she also was married to Robert A. Walker, a businessman from Los Angeles.

=== Death ===
Fisher died in Los Angeles in 2000, aged 65, reportedly from kidney failure and emphysema. (Note: The reference book African Americans in the Performing Arts says that Fisher died of lung cancer.) Twelve hours later, her brother Clifton died from heart failure.

== Filmography ==
=== Film ===
Year	Title	Role	Notes
1960	The New Girl	The New Girl in the Office	Short film co–written by Lewis Freedman and Lester Cooper and directed by Freedman
1987	Mankillers	Joan Hanson	Action film written and directed by David A. Prior

=== Television ===
Year	Title	Role	Notes
1959–60	The Play of the Week	Joyce Lane	Episode: "Simply Heavenly"
1959–60	The Play of the Week	Guest	Episode: "Climate of Eden"
1962	The Defenders	The Singer	Episode: "Grandma TNT"
1963	The Doctors	Diane	Recurring
1967	He & She	Helen	Episode: "One of Our Firemen is Missing"
1967	The Second Hundred Years	Young Matron	Episode: "Luke's First Christmas"
1968	My Three Sons	Carla	Episode: "Gossip, Incorporated"
1968–1975	Mannix	Peggy Fair	147 episodes Golden Globe Award for Best Actress – Television Series Drama; Golden Globe Award for Best Supporting Actress – Series, Miniseries or Television Film; Primetime Emmy Award for Outstanding Supporting Actress in a Drama Series; Nominated—Golden Globe Award for Best Supporting Actress – Series, Miniseries or Television Film (1972, 1974); Nominated—Primetime Emmy Award for Outstanding Supporting Actress in a Drama Series (1971–1973)
1969	Love, American Style	Mercy	Segment: "Love and the Hustler"
1970	Insight	Mrs. Carter	Episode: "The Incident on Danker Street"
1971	Celebrity Bowling	Herself	Recurring
1971	Room 222	Diana Brown	Episode: "Welcome Back, Miss Brown"
1971	Love, American Style	Penny	Segment: "Love and the Baby"
1972	Every Man Needs One	Pauline Kramer	Made-for-TV-film written by Carl Kleinschmitt and directed by Jerry Paris
1973	Match Game '73	Herself	Game show
1975	Medical Center	Bonnie Horne	Episode: "Street Girl"
1979	Fantasy Island	Dr. Frantz	Episode: "Hit Man/The Swimmer"
1982	General Hospital	Judge Heller	Recurring
1983	Knight Rider	Thelma	Episode: "Short Notice"
1985	Hotel	Fran Willis	Episode: "Hearts and Minds"
1986	He's the Mayor	Lila	Episode: "Take My Father Please"
1990	Donor	Secretary	Made-for-TV-film written by Michael Braverman and directed by Larry Shaw

== Awards and honors ==
Year	Result	Award	Category	Television series
1970	Won	Emmy Awards	Outstanding Performance by an Actress in a Supporting Role in Drama	Mannix
1971	Nominated	Emmy Awards	Outstanding Performance by an Actress in a Supporting Role in Drama	Mannix
1972	Nominated	Emmy Awards	Outstanding Performance by an Actress in a Supporting Role in Drama	Mannix
1973	Nominated	Emmy Awards	Outstanding Performance by an Actress in a Supporting Role in Drama	Mannix
1971	Won	Golden Globe Award	Best Supporting Actress - Television Series	Mannix
1972	Nominated	Golden Globe Award	Best Supporting Actress - Television Series	Mannix
1973	Won	Golden Globe Award	Best Actress - Television Series Drama	Mannix
1974	Nominated	Golden Globe Award	Best Supporting Actress - Television Series	Mannix
