= Deke =

Deke may refer to:

== People ==
- Deke Anderson, actor
- Deke Cooper, football player
- Deke Leonard, musician
- Deke Sharon, singer, musician, producer
- Deke Slayton, one of the original seven Mercury astronauts
- Dikembe Mutombo, basketball player

== Other uses ==
- Deke (ice hockey), a technique used to move past an opponent
- Delta Kappa Epsilon, a college fraternity
- Deke, a character in the video game Fire Emblem: The Binding Blade
- Deke Rivers, Elvis Presley's character in the film Loving You (1957 film)
- DEKE, a defunct political party
