= Joe Spinell =

American actor (1936–1989)

- Spinell on the set of The Godfather
- Born: Joseph Spagnuolo; October 28, 1936; Manhattan, New York, U.S.
- Died: January 13, 1989 (aged 52); Queens, New York, U.S.
- Resting place: Calvary Cemetery
- Occupation: Actor
- Years active: 1971–1989
- Spouse: Jean Jennings (m. 1977; div. 1979)
- Children: 1
- Relatives: Steve Spagnuolo (cousin)

Joe Spinell (born Joseph Spagnuolo; October 28, 1936 – January 13, 1989) was an American character actor who appeared in films in the 1970s and 1980s, as well as various stage productions on and off Broadway. He played supporting roles in film including The Godfather (1972) and The Godfather Part II (1974), Rocky (1976), Rocky II (1979), Taxi Driver (1976), Sorcerer (1977) and Cruising (1980).

Until Spinell's death in 1989, his career ranged from bit to major supporting roles. Spinell played lead roles in horror films, sharing the screen with actress Caroline Munro in the first two: the psychological slasher film Maniac (1980), the horror comedy The Last Horror Film (1982); both had appeared together in the science fiction movie Starcrash (1978). He also appeared in the slasher film The Undertaker (1988), which was released posthumously.

== Early life ==
Spinell was born Joseph Spagnuolo (Italian pronunciation: [spaɲˈɲwɔːlo]) in Manhattan, New York, the second-to-youngest of six children of Italian immigrant parents. His father, Pellegrino Spagnuolo (1892–1950), died from liver and kidney disease. His mother, Filomena Spagnuolo (1903–1987), was an actress who played bit parts in several movies, some of them alongside her son. Spinell was born at his family's apartment on Second Avenue in Kips Bay, Manhattan, an area then home to 10,000 Italian Americans. A few years after the death of his father, he moved with his mother and older siblings to Woodside, Queens, New York, where he lived off-and-on for the remainder of his life. In the mid and late 1970s when living in California, he lived in an apartment in the Oakwood Apartments complex near Toluca Lake located on Barham Boulevard. Spinell was born with hemophilia and had chronic asthma for most of his life.

== Career ==
=== Early 1970s to 1982: Rise to prominence ===
As a teenager and young adult, Spinell starred in various stage plays, both on and off Broadway. He performed with a troupe called Theater of the Forgotten, who specialized in staging unconventional performances, such as in prisons, and went through a number of jobs in New York, including a taxi driver and a clerk at both a post office and liquor store. Because of his large, heavyset frame and imposing looks, Spinell was often cast as criminals, thugs, or corrupt police officers.

In 1971, he landed his first film role in a small part as the mafioso hitman Willi Cicci working for the Corleone crime family in the crime film The Godfather, directed by Francis Ford Coppola. Spinell was so liked by Coppola that he was hired as a day player for the film's six-month shoot, and while he worked in an uncredited capacity, the only actor in the film who was paid more than him was Marlon Brando. The Godfather would become the highest-grossing film of 1972 and was for a time the highest-grossing film ever made. It won the Academy Awards for Best Picture, Actor and Best Adapted Screenplay, and garnered several other nominations.

In 1973, he acted in Aram Avakian's Cops and Robbers, and Philip D'Antoni's The Seven-Ups.

In 1974, Spinell reprised his role as Willi Cicci in The Godfather Part II, where Cicci is still working for the Corleone crime family, but having been promoted from "soldier" (aka: 'button man') to being the personal bodyguard to Frank Pentangeli (Michael V. Gazzo). The film was nominated for 11 Academy Awards, and became the first sequel to win Best Picture. It was Paramount Pictures' highest-grossing film of 1974 and was the sixth-highest-grossing picture in North America that year.

In 1975, he acted in Frank Perry's Rancho Deluxe, Barry Shear's Strike Force, Dick Richards's Farewell, My Lovely, and Thomas McGuane's 92 in the Shade.

In 1976, he acted in Paul Mazursky's Next Stop, Greenwich Village, Martin Scorsese's Taxi Driver, and Bob Rafelson's Stay Hungry. That year, Spinell played the role of Gazzo, a loan shark in John G. Avildsen's Rocky. It earned $225 million in global box office receipts, becoming the highest-grossing film of 1976, went on to win three Oscars, including Best Picture, and turned lead actor Sylvester Stallone into a major star.

In 1977, he acted in Sorcerer, a thriller adaptation of The Wages of Fear directed by William Friedkin.

In 1978, he acted in Paul Williams's Nunzio, John Milius's Big Wednesday, Sylvester Stallone's Paradise Alley, and The One Man Jury. He also played the main antagonist in Luigi Cozzi's Italian-produced space opera Starcrash, starring Caroline Munro and Marjoe Gortner.

In 1979, he acted in Jonathan Demme's Last Embrace, and William Richert's Winter Kills. Spinell reprised his role as Gazzo in Rocky II this time directed by Sylvester Stallone. Rocky II finished in the top three highest-grossing films of 1979, in both the North American market and worldwide. The film grossed $6,390,537 during its opening weekend, $85,182,160 at the U.S. box office, and $200,182,160 overall.

=== 1980 to 1982: leading man in horror films and subsequent films ===
Although primarily known as a character actor, Spinell co-wrote, co-produced, and starred in his first lead role as a serial killer in the 1980 film Maniac, the psychological slasher film directed by William Lustig.

Also in 1980, he acted in Curtis Hanson's The Little Dragons, William Friedkin's Cruising, William Peter Blatty's The Ninth Configuration, Bernard L. Kowalski's Nightside, Stuart Rosenberg's Brubaker, Brian G. Hutton's The First Deadly Sin, and Jonathan Demme's Melvin and Howard.

In 1981, Spinell had a supporting role in the Sylvester Stallone action film Nighthawks, and Richard Elfman's Forbidden Zone.

In 1982, he acted in National Lampoon's Movie Madness, Night Shift, Monsignor, and One Down, Two to Go.

That year he starred in David Winters's horror comedy The Last Horror Film, co-starring and reuniting him with Caroline Munro. It played in film festivals, where it won and received several nominations. The film is praised for its unique blend of self-reflexive horror, humor, and inventive filmmaking. Critics highlight its avant-garde approach. Joe Spinell's performance is widely celebrated as the heart of the film, with his real-life mother adding charm. The movie is described as an entertaining and nostalgic treat for horror fans. Many regard it as a standout in Spinell's career and a cult classic of the genre. Morgan Elektra of Dread Central said "Spinell’s performance is really the lynchpin of the whole film" and "I can’t think of a single frame where he wasn’t completely selling the role".

=== 1983 to 1989: Final roles ===
In 1983, he played a corrupt lawyer in William Lustig's vigilante film Vigilante. He also acted in Curtis Hanson's Losin' It, Nicolas Roeg's Eureka, and Fred Williamson's The Last Fight .

In 1985, he played the main villain in the crime film Walking the Edge, starring Robert Forster.

Early in 1986, Spinell guest starred as a Mob Boss on the television series, The Equalizer in "Wash Up" opposite Robert Davi. That same year he acted in John Byrum's film The Whoopee Boys, Robert Forster's Hollywood Harry, and Fred Williamson's The Messenger. That year, he made Maniac 2: Mr. Robbie, a horror short promotional film directed by Buddy Giovinazzo and co-written by Spinell and Joe Cirillo which was loosely based on a 1973 feature film titled An Eye for an Eye (aka: The Psychopath). The short film was produced by Joe Spinell in order to raise financing for a sequel to Spinell's 1980 horror film Maniac. The short was included with the 30th anniversary edition release of Maniac.

In 1987, Spinell acted in The Pick-up Artist, and Deadly Illusion.

In 1988, Spinell played a corrupt military official in David A. Prior's Operation Warzone. His last lead role was completed in 1988, a slasher film named The Undertaker. The film was never released for the public, only existed in an incomplete form. In 2010, The Undertaker was released on DVD release by Code Red, and restored by Vinegar Syndrome on Blu-ray in 2016. The film is considered a cult classic, due in part to Joe Spinell's involvement and its long and troubled production.

In 1989, Spinell played a U.S. government official in Rapid Fire, directed by David A. Prior which was his final role.

Spinell was set to reprise his role as Willi Cicci in The Godfather Part III (1990) but he died before filming began. His character was replaced by Joey Zasa, played by Joe Mantegna.

== Personal life ==
Spinell was married to adult film star Jean Jennings (1957–2011) from February 1977 to July 1979. They had one daughter together before they divorced.

A close friend of Sylvester Stallone, Spinell was the godfather of his son Sage Stallone. Spinell had a falling out with Sylvester Stallone during the filming of their final collaboration, Nighthawks (1981). On their friendship Stallone said "I love Joe Spinell and considered him a dear friend and would do anything for him. We had met when I had one or two lines in Farewell, My Lovely. He was truly one of a kind, but he had some very deep personal problems on the set of Nighthawks and became distant. It was around that time his mother also passed away, who he lived for and Joe was never the same."

Spinell was known to abuse drugs and alcohol intermittently throughout his career and would also suffer from periods of depression. This, coupled with his mother's death in 1987, caused Spinell to fall into ill health in his final years.

== Death ==
Spinell died in his apartment in Queens, New York on January 13, 1989, at the age of 52. He had cut himself badly after slipping in the shower and his hemophilia caused him to bleed to death. He was buried in Calvary Cemetery, Queens near his home.

== Filmography ==
=== Film ===
Feature films
| Year | Title | Role | Notes |
|---|---|---|---|
| 1972 | The Godfather | Willi Cicci | Uncredited |
| 1973 | Cops and Robbers | Marty | |
| 1973 | The Seven-Ups | Toredano | |
| 1974 | The Godfather Part II | Willi Cicci | |
| 1975 | Rancho Deluxe | Mr. Colson | |
| 1975 | Farewell, My Lovely | Nick | |
| 1975 | 92 in the Shade | Ollie Slatt | |
| 1976 | Next Stop, Greenwich Village | Cop At El Station | |
| 1976 | Taxi Driver | The Personnel Officer | |
| 1976 | Stay Hungry | Jabo | |
| 1976 | Rocky | Tony Gazzo | |
| 1977 | Sorcerer | "Spider" | |
| 1978 | Nunzio | Angelo | |
| 1978 | Big Wednesday | U.S. Army Psychologist | |
| 1978 | Paradise Alley | "Burp" | |
| 1978 | The One Man Jury | Mika Abatino | |
| 1978 | Starcrash | Count Zarth Arn | |
| 1979 | Last Embrace | Man In Cantina | |
| 1979 | Winter Kills | Arthur Fletcher | |
| 1979 | Rocky II | Tony Gazzo | |
| 1979 | The Little Dragons | Yancey | |
| 1980 | Cruising | Patrolman DiSimone | |
| 1980 | The Ninth Configuration | Lieutenant Spinell | |
| 1980 | Forbidden Zone | The Sailor, Squeezeit's Father | |
| 1980 | Maniac | Frank Zito | |
| 1980 | Brubaker | Floyd Birdwell | |
| 1980 | Melvin and Howard | Go-Go Club Owner | Uncredited |
| 1980 | The First Deadly Sin | Charles Lipsky | |
| 1981 | Nighthawks | Lieutenant Munafo | |
| 1982 | National Lampoon Goes to the Movies | Talent Agent / Beauty Show M.C. | ("Success Wanters") |
| 1982 | Night Shift | Manetti | |
| 1982 | The Last Horror Film | Vinny Durand | also known as Fanatic |
| 1982 | Monsignor | Bride's Father | |
| 1982 | One Down, Two To Go | Joe Spangler | |
| 1983 | Vigilante | Eisenberg | |
| 1983 | Losin' It | U.S. Customs Officer | |
| 1983 | Eureka | Pete | |
| 1983 | The Last Fight | Angelo, The Boss | |
| 1983 | The Big Score | Mayfield | |
| 1985 | Walking the Edge | Brusstar | |
| 1986 | The Whoopee Boys | Guido Antonucci | |
| 1986 | Hollywood Harry | Max Caldwell | |
| 1986 | Maniac 2: Mr. Robbie | Mr. Robbie | Short film |
| 1986 | The Messenger | Rico | |
| 1987 | The Pick-up Artist | Eddie | |
| 1987 | Deadly Illusion | Crazy Man in Gun Bureau | |
| 1988 | Operation Warzone | Delevane | |
| 1988 | Married to the Mob | Leonard "Tiptoes" Mazzilli | (scenes deleted) |
| 1988 | The Undertaker | Roscoe | |
| 1989 | Rapid Fire | Hansen | final role |

=== Television ===
| Year | Title | Role | Notes |
|---|---|---|---|
| 1975 | Strike Force | Sol Terranova | |
| 1977 | The Godfather Saga | Willi Cicci | Archive footage from the previous two Godfather films |
| 1979 | Vampire | Captain Desher | |
| 1980 | Nightside | Michael Vincent | |
| 1983 | Trackdown: Finding the Goodbar Killer | Escobar | |
| 1985 | Out of the Darkness | Jim Halsey | |
| 1986 | The Equalizer | Mob Boss | Episode: "Wash Up" |
| 1986 | The Children of Times Square | Street Vendor | |
| 1986 | Blood Ties | Joey | |
| 1986–1987 | Night Heat | Tommy Angel / Carlucci / Joe "Uncle Joe" Latimer | 3 episodes |
| 1989 | Dream Street | Johnnie Pinball | pilot episode |

== Works cited ==
- Budnik, Daniel R. (2017). '80s Action Movies on the Cheap. North Carolina: MacFarland & Company Inc. ISBN 9780786497416
