= Space Mutiny =

1988 film by Neal Sundstrom and David Winters

- U.S. video art
- Directed by: Neal Sundstrom (uncredited); David Winters (credit only)
- Written by: David Winters (as Maria Dante); Ian Yule (uncredited)
- Produced by: David Winters
- Starring: Reb Brown; Cisse Cameron; Cameron Mitchell; James Ryan; John Phillip Law; Graham Clark; Billy Second; Rufus Swart
- Cinematography: Vincent G. Cox; Andrew Parke
- Edited by: Bill Asher; Charlotte Konrad; Catherine Meyburon
- Music by: Tim James; Mark Mancina; Steve McClintock
- Production company: Action International Pictures
- Distributed by: A.I.P. Home Video (U.S.)
- Release date: 10 April 1989 (U.S.)
- Running time: 93 minutes
- Countries: United States; South Africa
- Language: English

Space Mutiny is a 1988 American-South African science fiction film directed by Neal Sundstrom and David Winters, starring Reb Brown, Cisse Cameron, Cameron Mitchell, James Ryan and John Phillip Law. Brown stars as a hotshot pilot who visits a large spaceship, and uncovers a conspiracy led by its seditious security officer (Law).

The film had a troubled production, which saw intended director David Winters replaced by his assistant Neal Sundstrom before filming commenced, although Winters remained credited for contractual reasons. After its release, Winters disowned the film.

Initial reviews generally described the film as being an entertaining, unintentionally funny, and campy sci-fi. Retrospective reviews have more often been derisive. It has earned notice for its sparse production values and continuity errors. It was later included in a popular episode of the TV series Mystery Science Theater 3000.

== Plot ==
The Southern Sun is a generation ship, a spacefaring vessel that contains a large number of people, whose mission is to colonize a new world. Its voyage from its original homeworld (implied to be Earth) has lasted thirteen generations, so many of its inhabitants have been born and will die without ever setting foot on solid ground. This does not please Elijah Kalgan, chief of the Enforcers, the ship's security team. Together with chief engineer MacPhearson and pirates from the nearby Corona Borealis, Kalgan hatches a plot to disrupt the Southern Sun's navigation systems, before using his Enforcers to take over the ship and redirect it towards their constellation.

Kalgan sabotages a key part of the ship just as a small craft with an important professor aboard is on a landing trajectory. The loss of guidance control causes the craft to crash and explode. The pilot, Dave Ryder, is able to escape, but the professor dies in the explosion. This sabotage seals off the flight deck for a number of weeks, which gives Kalgan the opportunity to enact his plan. With most of the Southern Sun's population now held hostage, two of the ship's loyal officers, Commander Jansen and Captain Devers, enlist Ryder's assistance to regain control of the ship. He is begrudgingly aided by Jansen's daughter Dr. Lea Jansen.

== Cast ==
- Reb Brown as Dave Ryder
- John Phillip Law as Flight Commander Elijah Kalgan
- Cameron Mitchell as Commander Alex Jansen
- Cisse Cameron as Dr. Lea Jansen
- James Ryan as Chief Engineer MacPhearson
- Graham Clark as Captain Scott Devers
- Billy Second as Lieutenant Lemont
- Rufus Swart as Steve Codell

== Production ==
=== Development ===
The film was announced under the title Mutiny in Space, which it kept until after principal photography. It was written by Action International Pictures' David Winters under his frequent pseudonym Maria Dante, with uncredited contributions from South African Ian Yule, who had previously worked for AIP. It was intended to be directed by AIP co-founder David A. Prior, but he was busy with the post-production of Deadly Prey, so Winters was encouraged by his financial backers to step in.

=== Casting ===
Producer David Winters signed Reb Brown thanks to positive reviews of his performance in Death of a Soldier. Brown asked Winters if he could hire his wife Cisse Cameron, which he accepted. John Phillip Law was cast due to his role in the vintage sci-fi film Barbarella. James Ryan and Cameron Mitchell both had an established relationship with Winters. Executive producer Hope Holiday had studied jazz dance with Winters. She also was Mitchell's friend and regular associate. Mitchell also brought onboard his son Chip and his daughter Camille (the latter in a voice role).

=== Filming ===
Principal photography took place around August and September 1987. Per one source, Transkei, a nominally independent Xhosa state located in southeastern South Africa, was announced as the main location. However, first-hand accounts indicate that filming took place near Johannesburg, Transvaal. On the first day of shooting, director David Winters received news that his father had died. He immediately passed directorial duties onto his local assistant, Neal Sundstrom, and left for New York to stay with his mother. However, he was soon summoned back to South Africa by the law firm in charge of the production, as he was contractually obligated to direct the film. A compromise was reached with Holiday, where the grieving Winters would remain in his hotel room, and be driven to set only when the film's financiers announced a visit.

The picture was shot inside a power plant, and several scenes make no attempt to hide the surrounding industrial decor. According to Winters, he simply intended to leave those elements out of shot. For his part, cinematographer Vincent G. Fox says that he added a reddish tint to the film, in order to pass the sunlight peering through the windows as the glare produced by the ship's reactors. A line of dialogue was supposed to explain this, but was ultimately not filmed, and the lab responsible for the color correction erased the effect. Winters, however, had no recollection of this. Cameron Mitchell was annoyed by his character's bushy prosthetic beard, as it prevented him from eating properly.

=== Post-production ===
Immediately after wrap, Sundstrom left the project and Winters, who had just been diagnosed with endocarditis, had to edit the film from his hospital room, where an editing bay was installed. Winters justified the inclusion of a shot of actress Claudia Jacobs, whose Lieutenant character seems to have been fatally shot in the prior scene, by the fact that no better one was available. The space exteriors were lifted wholesale from Battlestar Galactica and licensed for $20,000. Winters has claimed that the decision to add the stock footage was taken during post-production to salvage the picture, and was not part of the original plan.

While the film was announced as "complete" at the October 1987 MIFED (Mercato internazionale del film e del documentario) , Winters realized that it was not long enough, and commissioned David A. Prior to shoot the additional subplot involving the Belarians in mid-1988, using his Deadly Prey crew and some dancers from the producer's own studio (as he was also a choreographer). Winters has since disowned the film.

== Release ==
In the U.S., Space Mutiny was released direct-to-video by A.I.P. Home Video on 10 April 1989. The film was packaged with a tape of The Last Frontier, a 30-minute ambient video retracing the conquest of space and set to music by electronic musician Jan Hammer, which was kept exclusive to the bundle for two months. The film was seen first in some international territories, such as Australia, where it premiered in the week of 1 December 1988, through Palace Entertainment.

== Reception ==
=== Initial reviews ===
The Variety reviewer credited as Lor. found the film "an okay space saga", noting that "[c]ute model shots provide a patina of space opera section though the special effects are decidedly chintzy" and some vehicles appear "left over from a Dodgem arcade ride."

Writing in the Abilene Reporter-News, Danny Reagan deemed it a "Battlestar Gallactica for the big screen", in which "[s]ome of the effects are pretty good, and some are not". He summed it up as "strictly B-grade sci-fi movie fare, but pretty good B-stuff."

While he thought the dialogue wasn't very good, Tom Lounges of The Hammond Times wrote that the "film is never at loss for action and special-effect sequences". He found John Phillip Law's performance too campy, but liked James Ryan, Reb Brown, and Cameron Mitchell.

Mike Mayo of The Roanoke Times was also positive, although he saw the film as an outright spoof, comparing its tone to that of the old Batman series. He warned that "[t]he rewards of Space Mutiny are hard to describe", as it "turned that expensive series [Battlestar Galactica] into high camp silliness". He added that "Winters keeps the pace of the action and the florid overacting at the level of a 1930s serial", and that "[f]or fans of alternative video, this one is a treat".

Self-professed drive-in critic Joe Bob Briggs called the film "a 1954 sci-fi ray gun that they forgot to make until recently [...] We’re talking miniskirt tunics on the girls, gas masks on the evil space pirates, and Cameron with a beard like Moses and a choir robe the size of a circus tent".

=== Retrospective reviews ===
The Psychotronic Video Guide To Film assessed: "If the disco scene (with hula hoops) or the telepathic alien women dancing in bathing suits don't have you laughing, just concentrate on Cissy, Mitchell’s real-life daughter. She’s not only too old for the role, her acting makes everyone else in the cast seem like surefire Oscar material! The familiar-looking space footage is all from Battlestar Galactica and the interiors look just like a warehouse."

In a James Ryan profile, genre film author M. Ray Lott called the film "thoroughly derivative" and criticized the reliance on Galactica stock footage, noting: "Visually, Space Mutiny constitutes an homage to 30s art deco science fiction serials like Buck Rogers, with many of the crew dressed in padded, wide-shouldered uniforms". He found that only Ryan's performance "merits any praise", while "unintentional humor abounds."

Space Mutiny

Explore Multimedia audio drama
- Series: Saga of a Fugitive Fleet
- Directed by: Daniel Earnshaw
- Produced by: Daniel Earnshaw
- Starring: Terry Carter; Laurette Spang; Jack Stauffer; Noah Hathaway; Anne Lockhart; Sarah Rush
- Length: 1:07:41
- Release date: 4 December 2020

== Related works ==
=== Mystery Science Theater 3000 episode ===
The film served as the basis for the 20th episode of season 8 of Mystery Science Theater 3000, a television series that matched a feature film with a comedic commentary track. The popularity of the episode led to the live broadcast of a second commentary in theaters on 14 June 2018, performed by the former MST3K troupe under their new moniker, RiffTrax.

=== Audio drama ===
In 2020, the plot of Space Mutiny was adapted into an eponymous episode of the audio drama Saga of a Fugitive Fleet, an unofficial continuation of the original Battlestar Galactica series. In the revamped plot, Kalgan is the head of Fleet Security and stages a mutiny designed to divert the fleet from its search for the planet Earth. Original cast members Terry Carter, Noah Hathaway, Anne Lockhart, Sarah Rush and Laurette Spang participated, in addition to licensed archive audio from Lorne Green, John Colicos and Richard Hatch. It was released on CD and digital download on 4 December 2020.

== Works cited ==
- Winters, David (2018). Tough Guys Do Dance. Pensacola: Indigo River Publishing. ISBN 9781948080279.
- The Crazy Story Behind Space Mutiny (documentary featurette). The Bad Movie Bible. Hill, Rob. 5 October 2020.
