= Rapid Fire (1989 film) =

- Directed by: David A. Prior
- Written by: David A. Prior
- Starring: Joe Spinell; Dawn Tanner; Michael Wayne; Gary Olsen
- Release date: 1989
- Country: United States
- Language: English

Rapid Fire is a 1989 American action film produced by Action International Pictures and directed by David A. Prior. It was filmed in Mobile, Alabama and it is the last film appearance of Joe Spinell, who died shortly after filming ended.

== Plot ==
A former US special agent-turned-mercenary named Eddy Williams sneaks aboard a battleship disguised as a U.S. Navy officer where an international terrorist named Mustapha Amed is held. Armed with a rapid-firing, multi-purpose machine gun, Williams releases Amed, kills many crewmen and soldiers on the ship and gets away with the terrorist. Mike Thompson, a former government agent, is forced to come out of retirement by his former superior officer, Hansen, to help the government track down and find Williams and Amed before they plan a major terrorist strike using the multi-purpose weapon. Thompson seeks assistance of a mercenary friend of his, named Pappy, to help find Williams while a seductive female agent, named Corey Parker, is assigned to keep a close eye on Thompson and of his movements. Williams and Thompson both have a personal grudge against the other when, while serving in Vietnam, Williams attempted to kill Thompson during a firefight and left him for dead. When Williams learns that Thompson is alive and after him, he decides to use Corey as a hostage to get Thompson to approach him for a showdown.

Williams has his men kidnap Corey and offer Thompson to give up his life to spare hers. After getting away from Hansen and his agents, Thompson and Pappy rescue Corey before she is to be killed and force one of the enemy henchmen to reveal the location of the hideout of Williams. Thompson, Pappy, and Corey launch a climatic attack against the Williams compound where in the firefight, all of William's men are killed. Corey personally takes on and kills Amed while he is trying to escape. Williams arms himself with his multi-purpose machine gun and exchanges gunfire with Thompson. Cornered in a warehouse, Thompson and Williams engage each other in a hand-to-hand combat fistfight, which ends with Thompson besting Williams, but back out on finishing him off. As Thompson, Pappy and Corey walk away, Williams re-arms himself with his machine gun, but upon pulling the trigger, finds that minutes before, Thompson changed the fail-safe code on the weapon which enables itself to self-destruct should the improper code be put in prior to being armed. The weapon explodes and takes Williams with it.

== Cast ==
- Ron Waldron as Mike Thompson
- Michael Wayne as Eddy Williams
- Dawn Tanner as Corey Parker
- Del Zamora as Mustapha Amed
- Douglas Harter as Pappy
- Joe Spinell as Hansen
- Gary Olsen as Miles
- Sue Hawkins as Martha
- Robert Willoughby as Charlie
- Tracy Shepherd as Sonny
- Bruce Hearn as Siso
