= Mercy Black =

- Poster
- Directed by: Owen Egerton
- Written by: Owen Egerton
- Produced by: Seth Caplan; John Lang; Adam Hendricks; Greg Gilreath
- Starring: Daniella Pineda; Austin Amelio; Janeane Garofalo
- Cinematography: Ellie Ann Fenton
- Edited by: Sean McQueeny
- Music by: Kazimir Boyle
- Production companies: Blumhouse Productions; Meridian Entertainment; Symbolic Exchange; Divide/Conquer
- Distributed by: Netflix
- Release date: March 31, 2019
- Running time: 88 minutes
- Country: United States
- Language: English
- Box office: $200,046

Mercy Black is a 2019 American horror film written and directed by Owen Egerton. It stars Daniella Pineda as a woman who is released from a psychiatric hospital 15 years after stabbing a classmate because of an urban legend about a ghost known as Mercy Black. After her nephew Bryce (Miles Emmons) becomes obsessed with the same ghost, she comes to believe the ghost may be real. Austin Amelio and Janeane Garofalo appear in supporting roles. The film was released to Netflix on March 31, 2019, with no prior announcement.

== Plot ==
As a teenager, Marina Hess and Rebecca Cline stabbed a classmate. The attack was motivated by Marina's belief that the sacrifice to a ghost called Mercy Black would cure her mother's illness.

Fifteen years later, Marina is released from a psychiatric hospital to her sister, Alice. To Marina's dismay, urban legends about Mercy Black have spread on the internet, and are an obsession of Bryce, Alice's son.

While facing her past to help Bryce avoid the same fate, Marina questions whether Mercy Black is merely her own delusion. Visiting Rebecca, Marina discovers that Rebecca is now in a catatonic state, following an attempt to hang herself. Looking around Rebecca's room, Marina discovers an old map. She hallucinates Rebecca attacking her.

At school, Bryce's actions become increasingly erratic. When questioned about an incident with his friend, he says "she told me to do it".

Meanwhile, Marina follows the map through the woods, eventually reaching a nuclear fallout shelter. Inside, she finds "the book you cannot read" and remembers that they created Mercy Black. While Marina now believes that Mercy never existed, Bryce falls deeper into the delusion. While alone in the house, Bryce and Alice have an encounter with Mercy Black, leading to Alice falling over the stair rail. After Marina arrives, Mercy Black attacks her. When Bryce flees out the door, he runs straight into the arms of the librarian, who turns out to be Lily Bellows, the girl Marina and Rebecca intended to sacrifice.

Lily, consumed by the delusion, expresses anger that Marina didn't kill her as promised, then suppressed the memory. She admits to hurting people to make Marina remember but Marina insists that they made Mercy up. Lily stabs Marina and threatens to slit Bryce's throat. Marina overpowers Lily and begins choking her, but releases her. Bryce then stabs Lily in the eye and says "I made a promise" as Mercy Black appears behind him.

== Cast ==
- Daniella Pineda as Marina Hess
  - Jamy Lentz as young Marina
- Austin Amelio as William Nylund
- Elle LaMont as Alice Hess
- Lee Eddy as Lily Bellows
  - Elke Boucher-Depew as young Lily
- Miles Emmons as Bryce
- Janeane Garofalo as Dr. Ward
- Dylan Gage as Sam
- Rochelle Robinson as Mrs. Cline
- Jessie Tilton as Rebecca Cline
  - Sophiánna Smith as young Rebecca

== Production ==
Writer-director Egerton said he began researching childhood crimes after the Slender Man stabbing. One of the inspirations for the story was Mary Bell, who had murdered two toddlers when she was a child. Bell had been granted a new identity after being released from jail, but tabloid reporters discovered her new identity. Producers wanted the protagonist to be innocent, but Egerton told them that the story depended on facing one's past.

== Release ==
Mercy Black was released on Netflix with no advance notice on March 31, 2019.

== Reception ==
=== Box office ===
The film grossed $200,046 at the box office.

=== Critical response ===
On the review aggregator website Rotten Tomatoes, 50% of 12 critics' reviews are positive, with an average rating of 4.8/10. Metacritic, which uses a weighted average, assigned the film a score of 48 out of 100, based on 4 critics, indicating "mixed or average" reviews.

Noel Murray of the Los Angeles Times compared it favorably to Slender Man, calling it "nerve-wracking throughout". Matthew Monagle of The Austin Chronicle rated it 2/5 stars and criticized the film for exploiting mental illness as a plot device instead of making intelligent observations. William Bibbiani of IGN rated it 5.5/10 and wrote that the film fails to live up to its disturbing premise because of the poor writing and direction.
