= Night Trap (film) =

- Directed by: David A. Prior
- Written by: David A. Prior
- Produced by: Jill Silverthorne; David Winters
- Starring: Robert Davi; Michael Ironside; John Amos; Mike Starr; Mickey Jones; Lesley-Anne Down
- Cinematography: Don E. Fauntleroy
- Edited by: Tony Malanowski
- Music by: Christopher Farrell
- Distributed by: Prism Pictures; Echo Bridge Home Entertainment; West Side Studios
- Release date: 1993
- Running time: 93 minutes
- Country: United States
- Language: English

Night Trap, also known as Mardi Gras for the Devil, is a 1993 supernatural thriller film directed by David A. Prior and starring Robert Davi, Michael Ironside, John Amos, Mike Starr, Lesley-Anne Down and Mickey Jones.

== Premise ==
Veteran cop Mike Turner (Robert Davi) is brought in to help solve a string of baffling satanic homicides. He soon finds himself along with Captain Hodges (John Amos) seeking to catch a murderous psycho called Bishop (Michael Ironside) who's gone on a killing spree during New Orleans' Mardi Gras. Only problem is that this killer has lost his soul to the devil and is no longer human... but a seemingly indestructible demonic being, intent on destroying the lives of everyone around Mike; and shall not stop until he has cost Mike not just his life... but his soul.

== Cast ==
- Robert Davi as Detective Mike Turner
- Michael Ironside as Bishop
- John Amos as Captain Hodges
- Mike Starr as Detective Williams
- Mickey Jones as The Bartender
- Lesley-Anne Down as Christine Turner
- Lydie Denier as Valerie
- Margaret Avery as Miss Sadie
- Lillian Lehman as Mrs. Hodges
- Jack Forcinito (as Jack Verell) as Stevens
- David Dahlgren as Johnson
- Earl Jarrett as Guard
- Keri-Anne Bilotta as Michelle
- Butch Robbins as Driver
- Michael J. Anderson (as Michael Anderson) as Police Officer
- Lynwood Robinson as Police Officer
- Portia Bennett Johnson as Dancer
- John Neely as Face In The Fire
- Douglas Harter (as Doug Harter) as Face In The Fire
- Mario Opinato as Face In The Fire

== Critical response ==
Nine dead bodies. Twelve breasts. Blood-drinking. Wrist-slitting. Two bodies flung through plate-glass windows. Hooker torture. Exploding house. Four motor vehicle chases, with four crashes, explosion and fireball. Drive-In Academy Award nominations for Michael Ironside, as the you-know-who, for saying "Whose body would you like to hold next to you in bed, while the other lies rotting in a grave?" Two and a half stars. Joe Bob says check it out.

Night Trap received mostly negative reviews, with El Juan Shatzer of Bloodtype Online stating that he was disappointed that the talented cast was wasted on a tepid script and flat direction by David A. Prior. However Joe Bob Briggs recommended it with the above quote.
