= Speed (soundtrack) =

Speed: Songs from and Inspired by the Motion Picture

Soundtrack album by various artists
- Released: June 28, 1994
- Length: 50:04
- Label: 20th Century Fox
- Producer: Ralph Sall

Speed: Songs from and Inspired by the Motion Picture is the soundtrack to the 1994 action film Speed directed by Jan de Bont, starring Keanu Reeves and Sandra Bullock. It was distributed by 20th Century Fox Records on June 28, 1994, featuring selections of songs from and inspired by the film. It was commercially successful in Japan, selling 100,000 copies and was certified Gold by the Recording Industry Association of Japan (RIAJ).

== Background ==
In early 1994, producer Mark Gordon chose record producer Ralph Sall as the music supervisor for the film and its soundtrack. He was tasked to curate a concept album with a compilation of various songs from different eras and genres and featured a diverse range of artists, that would be similar to the film's genre. Thus, the resulting soundtrack consisted of songs mostly about speed, cars and travelling.

Michael Kamen was initially considered to do the score of the movie, however De Bont chose Mark Mancina, who at the time worked in some Hans Zimmer scores like Days of Thunder, Where Sleeping Dogs Lie and True Romance.

"Speed" is the main title song composed and recorded specifically for the film by singer-songwriter Billy Idol, which was a chart-topping success upon release.

== Reception ==
Leslie Mathew of AllMusic summarized that: "Speed was one of most entertaining movies of the '90s, and the soundtrack is a very worthy companion piece." Ty Burr of Entertainment Weekly criticized it as "a cynical album that feels like it was packaged by out-of-touch Hollywood ponytails" and assigned a D+ rating.

== Track listing ==
Speed (Songs from and Inspired by the Motion Picture) track listing
No.	Title	Artist(s)	Length
1.	"Speed"	Billy Idol, Steve Stevens	4:22
2.	"A Million Miles Away"	The Plimsouls	3:41
3.	"Soul Deep"	Gin Blossoms	3:06
4.	"Let's Go for a Ride"	Cracker	3:07
5.	"Go Outside and Drive"	Blues Traveler	4:51
6.	"Crash"	Ric Ocasek	5:05
7.	"Rescue Me"	Pat Benatar	3:01
8.	"Hard Road"	Rod Stewart	4:28
9.	"Cot"	Carnival Strippers	5:23
10.	"Cars ('93 Sprint Remix)"	Gary Numan	4:02
11.	"Like a Motorway"	Saint Etienne	5:43
12.	"Mr. Speed"	Kiss	3:17
Total length:			50:04

== Chart performance ==
Chart performance for Speed (Songs from and Inspired by the Motion Picture)
Chart (1994)	Peak position
Australian Albums (ARIA)	41
Japanese Albums (Oricon)	1
UK Albums (Official Charts)	65
UK Compilation Albums (Official Charts)	45
US Billboard 200	32

== Certifications ==
Certifications for Speed (Songs from and Inspired by the Motion Picture)
Region	Certification	Certified units/sales
Japan (RIAJ)	Gold	100,000^{^}
^{^} Shipments figures based on certification alone.
