= Zombie Wars =

- Directed by: David A. Prior
- Written by: David A. Prior
- Produced by: William Ferrell; Ted Prior; David A. Prior
- Starring: Adam Mayfield; Alissa Koenig; Jim Marlow; Kristi Renee Pearce
- Cinematography: Frédéric Chaignat
- Edited by: David Alan; Alan Roberts
- Music by: David M. Poole
- Production company: All American Pictures
- Distributed by: Echelon Studios; American World Pictures
- Release date: November 2, 2007 (Japan)
- Running time: 80 minutes
- Country: United States
- Language: English

Zombie Wars is a 2007 American war horror film written and directed by David A. Prior. It stars Adam Mayfield, Alissa Koenig, Jim Marlow, and Kristi Renee Pearce as humans struggling against zombie overlords.

== Premise ==
After a zombie apocalypse, humanity becomes enslaved by zombies. Bred in captivity for food, these humans receive no education or training. Bands of free humans work to free the captives and turn the tide against the zombies.

== Cast ==
- Adam Mayfield as David
- Alissa Koenig as Star
- Jim Marlow as Brian
- Kristi Renee Pearce as General
- Jonathan Badeen as Sliver
- Billy Hayes as George

== Release ==
A trailer was released in November 2006. On March 15, 2009, Zombie Wars played at the first Paranoia Horror Film Festival.

== Reception ==
Scott Foy of Dread Central rated the film 3/5 stars and called it "a fun little piece of pulp action horror – a modern day drive-in movie, breezy and cheesy, but done so with an unmistakable enthusiasm."

David Walker of DVD Talk rated the film 1/5 stars and said, "Zombie Wars is not a terrible film in the sense that it is not completely unwatchable. It is, however, a terrible film in that the script is bad, the direction is lackluster, the acting is marginal and the premise, which has hints of Planet of the Apes, is laughable in its execution."

Peter Dendle wrote that the film is "conceptually ambitious" but dragged down by its poor writing, acting, and production values.

== Works cited ==
- Dendle, Peter (2012). The Zombie Movie Encyclopedia: Volume 2, 2000-2010. North Carolina: McFarland Publishing. ISBN 978-0-7864-6163-9.
