= Hollywood Harry =

- Directed by: Robert Forster
- Written by: Curt Allen
- Produced by: Robert Forster
- Starring: Robert Forster; Joe Spinell; Kate Forster; Shannon Wilcox
- Cinematography: Gideon Porath
- Edited by: Richard C. Meyer
- Distributed by: Cannon Films
- Release date: 1986
- Country: United States
- Language: English
- Budget: $1.5 million

Hollywood Harry is a 1986 American neo-noir film starring and directed by Robert Forster. It was Forster's first film as producer and director. The film also featured Forster's 14-year-old daughter, Kate.

== Plot ==
A private detective who is drinking himself to death is rescued by his niece and a new client who needs help.

== Production ==
The film was funded largely by Bran Arandjelovich. Forster did not take a fee for the film.

It was shot in 26 days in July and August 1984.
