= Lee Richardson (actor) =

American actor (1926–1999)

- Born: September 11, 1926; Chicago, Illinois, U.S.
- Died: October 2, 1999 (aged 72); New York City, New York, U.S.
- Years active: 1959–1992
- Spouse: Elaine Rower Richardson (m. 1961; died 1996)
- Children: 1

Lee Richardson (September 11, 1926 – October 2, 1999) was an American stage and screen actor. He acted in numerous Broadway and Off-Broadway productions and was a prolific player in regional theatres, co-founding Minneapolis' Guthrie Theater in 1963. On-screen, he often worked with director Sidney Lumet, appearing in several of his films between 1976 and 1992. He was nominated for a Tony Award in 1972, for his role in Robert Bolt's Vivat! Vivat Regina!.

== Life and career ==
Richardson was born in Chicago, Illinois. During World War II, he served in the Army Air Forces and was stationed in England, where he was introduced to the works of William Shakespeare and Noël Coward. After an honorable discharge, Richardson enrolled in Loyola University Chicago as a prelaw major. After one semester, he decided to pursue the dramatic arts instead, and left Loyola to study at the Goodman Theatre's acting school.

Richardson was one of several founding members of the Guthrie Theater in Minneapolis. His Shakespearean background saw him often play characters with a clipped English accent, and he was sometimes mistaken to be British. In 1972, he was nominated for a Tony Award for Best Featured Actor in a Play for his performance in Vivat! Vivat Regina!.

Richardson appeared in such films as Brubaker, Prince of the City, Prizzi's Honor, Tiger Warsaw, The Fly II, Q&A, The Exorcist III, Daniel and A Stranger Among Us and such television series as Law & Order and Hearts and Minds. He also narrated Network and appeared in the television film Skylark. He appeared in an uncredited role as Franklin D. Roosevelt in Truman.

== Personal life and death ==
Richardson died of cardiac arrest on October 2, 1999, in New York City, aged 73.

== Partial theatre credits ==
- 1952: Summer and Smoke
- 1956-57: Saint Joan
- 1957: Volpone
- 1959: The Legend of Lizzie
- 1960: Summer and Smoke
- 1960-61: Becket
- 1961: The Death of Bessie Smith
- 1962: The Merchant of Venice
- 1962: Someone From Assisi
- 1962: King Lear
- 1962-63: Lord Pengo
- 1963: Hamlet
- 1963: Death of a Salesman
- 1964: Saint Joan
- 1964: The Glass Menagerie
- 1964: Volpone
- 1965: Richard III
- 1966: The Skin of Our Teeth
- 1968-69: The House of Atreus
- 1968-69: The Resistible Rise of Arturo Ui
- 1970: Othello
- 1970: The Revenger's Tragedy
- 1971: Macbeth
- 1972: Vivat! Vivat Regina!
- 1973: The Jockey Club Stakes
- 1974: Find Your Way Home
- 1976: The Oldest Living Graduate
- 1979: Trick
- 1980: Tricks of the Trade
- 1979: Father's Day
- 1980: Goodbye Fidel
- 1980: Tricks of the Trade
- 1982: The Twelve-Pound Look
- 1983: Quartermaine's Terms
- 1983: It's Showdown Time
- 1984: Desire Under the Elms
- 1985: The Waltz of the Toreadors
- 1988-89: The Devil's Disciple
- 1990: Ivanov
- 1991: Getting Married

== Filmography ==
- 1959: Middle of the Night - Lockman's son
- 1976: Network - Narrator (voice)
- 1980: Brubaker - Warden Renfro
- 1981: Prince of the City - Sam Heinsdorff
- 1983: Daniel as Reporter
- 1983: I Am the Cheese - Mr. Grey
- 1985: Prizzi's Honor - Dominic Prizzi
- 1987: Sweet Lorraine - Sam
- 1987: Amazing Grace and Chuck - Jeffries
- 1987: The Believers - Dennis Maslow
- 1988: Tiger Warsaw - Mitchell Warsaw
- 1989: The Fly II - Anton Bartok
- 1990: Q&A - Leo Bloomenfeld
- 1990: The Exorcist III - University President
- 1992: A Stranger Among Us - Rebbe
