= Common Ground Music Festival =

Coordinates: 42°44′1″N 84°32′48″W

- Genre: Rock, World, Electronic, Comedy, Country, Reggae, Folk, Hip Hop, Dance, Pop
- Dates: Early-Mid July
- Location: Lansing, Michigan
- Years active: 2000–2019, 2021
- Website: commongroundfest.com

Common Ground Main Stage

The Common Ground Music Festival was an annual week-long music festival that took place in downtown Lansing, Michigan. The July festival, which began in the year 2000 and attracted 50,000-plus people each year, was located at the Louis Adado Riverfront Park along the Grand River. Co-created by Center Park Productions and Meridian Entertainment Group, it showcased national and regional artists in contemporary and classic rock, pop, alternative, folk, country, hip hop, and R&B music.

A year-round staff of about 10 people planned and organized the festival each year and got help from nearly 200 volunteers during the week of the event. Stage hands and temporary workers were hired to build the temporary structures.

== History ==
The Common Ground Music Festival was established as a not for profit 501(c)(3) corporation, Center Park Productions, in the year 2000. Center Park Productions was created by the Lansing Entertainment & Public Facilities Authority (LEPFA) in a partnership with the Meridian Entertainment Group (MEG), the creator of the festival.

Peak attendance for the week occurred in 2003 at about 87,000 patrons. In more recent years, crowds have been smaller, attracting between 50,000 and 60,000 people.

There was no festival in 2020.

== Local impact ==
The festival has generated an estimated $50 million+ for the local economy since its inception. More than $400,000 has been raised and contributed to schools, non-profits and other area organizations.

== Activities ==
Along with music the festival features a number of activities such as Ultimate Painting (a live painting competition), The Color Run, and a zip-line across the Grand River on festival grounds.
