= Persis Khambatta =

Indian model and actress (1948–1998)

- Persis Khambatta in 1978
- Born: 2 October 1948; Bombay, India
- Died: 18 August 1998 (aged 49); Bombay, India
- Occupations: Actress; model; beauty pageant
- Spouses: Cliff Taylor (m. 1981; div. 1981): Rui Saldanha (1989–?)
- Beauty pageant titleholder
- Years active: 1968–1998
- Major competitions: Femina Miss India 1965 (Winner); Miss Universe 1965 (Unplaced)

Persis Khambatta (2 October 1948 – 18 August 1998) was an Indian actress, model and beauty pageant titleholder best remembered for playing Lieutenant Ilia in the feature film Star Trek: The Motion Picture (1979).

== Biography ==
=== Early life and family ===
Persis Khambatta was born in Bombay to a middle-class Parsi family. Her father left her family when she was two years old. She first gained fame when a set of her pictures casually taken by a well-known Bombay photographer was used for a successful campaign for a popular soap brand. This eventually led to her becoming a model. She entered and won the Femina Miss India contest in 1965. She was the second winner of Femina Miss India and third Indian woman to participate in the Miss Universe pageant. At the Femina Miss India contest, she also won the Miss Photogenic award.

=== Modelling and acting career ===
Khambatta's first appearance at the age of 13 in advertisements for the soap brand Rexona set her on her way to becoming a popular model. At the age of 16, as Femina Miss India, Khambatta entered Miss Universe 1965 in July of that year, dressed in off-the-rack clothes she bought at the last minute. She became a model for companies such as Air India, Revlon, and Garden Vareli.

Khambatta made her Bollywood début in director K. A. Abbas's Bambai Raat Ki Bahon Mein (1968), playing cabaret singer Lily who croons the film's title track. She had small roles in Conduct Unbecoming and The Wilby Conspiracy (both 1975). She went on to have a brief movie career that included the role for which she is most recognized, the bald Deltan navigator Lieutenant Ilia, in Star Trek: The Motion Picture (1979). She shaved her head for the role. She was originally signed to play the role for five years, as the intention was to create a new Star Trek television series. Khambatta said that she was thrilled when the project became a movie instead, because it would have greater impact on her career, but she also recognised that she had lost five years' work. Khambatta became the first Indian citizen to present an Academy Award in 1980. She was nominated for the Saturn Award for Best Actress for her role in Star Trek. This led to roles in Nighthawks (1981), Megaforce (1982), Warrior of the Lost World (1983), and She-Wolves of the Wasteland (1988). She was considered for the title role in the James Bond film Octopussy (1983), but was passed over in favor of Maud Adams.

Co-star Stephen Collins described Khambatta in Star Trek as "a very gentle person, who I think was a little overwhelmed by Hollywood". In 1980, she was seriously injured in a car crash in West Germany, which left a huge scar on her head. In 1983, she underwent coronary artery bypass surgery. She returned to Bombay in 1985, and appeared in the 1986 Hindi movie Shingora opposite Aditya Pancholi and Marc Zuber. Soon after, Khambatta returned to Hollywood and performed in guest roles on various television series such as Mike Hammer and MacGyver. In 1997, she wrote and published a coffee table book, Pride of India, which featured several former Miss India winners. The book was dedicated to Mother Teresa, and part of the royalties went to the Missionaries of Charity. Her final appearance in an acting role was that of Chair of the Congress of Nations in the 1993 pilot episode of Lois & Clark: The New Adventures of Superman.

=== Personal life and death ===
Khambatta was first married to actor Cliff Taylor. In May 1989 she married Rui Saldanha, a former field hockey player who represented Great Britain at the 1972 Summer Olympics. The ceremony took place at the Polk County Courthouse in Des Moines, Iowa, where Saldanha worked as a representative of the New York Life Insurance Company.

Khambatta was a chain smoker. In 1998, she was taken to the Marine Hospital in south Mumbai, complaining of chest pains, and she died of a massive heart attack on 18 August 1998 at the age of 49. Her funeral was held in Mumbai the following day.

=== Death and murder allegations ===
The official cause of Persis Khambatta's 1998 death in Bombay (now Mumbai), India, was widely reported as a massive heart attack, a claim that was later disputed by her former publicist, the late Edward Lozzi. In a 2021 interview conducted by Zennie62Media CEO Zennie Abraham, Lozzi—who began representing Khambatta in 1985 and was also her former romantic partner—alleged that she was murdered. According to Lozzi, no autopsy was ever performed and Indian authorities did not issue a formal death certificate.

Lozzi claimed the motive for her alleged murder was strictly political. Khambatta was an avid supporter of former Indian Prime Minister Indira Gandhi, frequently attending campaign rallies with her, and was reportedly preparing to portray Gandhi in a biographical film. Lozzi alleged that this close association caused Khambatta to face severe harassment and death threats from political opponents, including having rocks with warning notes thrown through the windows of her home. Lozzi stated to Abraham that he had dispatched private investigators to India following her death, who concluded she was killed for ignoring these threats.

== Filmography ==
=== Film ===
Year	Title	Role	Notes
1965	Bheegi Rat		
1966	Pinjre Ke Panchhi	Amy	As Poonam
1968	Bambai Raat Ki Bahon Mein	Lily / Leela	As Persis Khambata
1969	Kama Sutra	Nanda	
1975	The Wilby Conspiracy	Persis Ray	
1975	Conduct Unbecoming	Mrs. Bandanai	
1979	Star Trek: The Motion Picture	Ilia	
1981	Nighthawks	Shakka	
1982	Megaforce	Zara	
1983	Warrior of the Lost World	Nastasia McWayne	
1984	First Strike	Sylvia Kruger	
1985	My Beautiful Laundrette		Uncredited
1987	Jazira	Unknown Role	Video
1988	She-Wolves of the Wasteland	Cobalt	aka Phoenix the Warrior; also associate producer
1988	Deadly Intent	Francesca Slate	

=== Television ===
Year	Title	Role	Notes
1965	Miss Universe Pageant	Self - Miss India	
1977	The Paul Ryan Show	Self	S1.E101: "Episode #1.101"
1977	The Man with the Power	Princess Siri	TV film
1979	The 58th Annual Photoplay Awards	Self	
1979	Multi-Coloured Swap Shop	Self	S4.E11: "Episode #4.11"
1980	Good Morning America	Self	Episode dated 11 January 1980
1980	The Mike Douglas Show	Self - Actress	S19.E87: "Episode #19.87"
1980	The 37th Annual Golden Globe Awards	Self - Presenter	
1980	The 52nd Annual Academy Awards	Self - Presenter	
1980	Men Who Rate a 10	Self	Variety Special
1981	Get High on Yourself	Self	TV special
1983	Casablanca	Muslim Woman	S1.E5: "Divorce Casablanca Style"
1983	The Merv Griffin Show	Self	S20.E85: "Joanna Lumley, Virginia Ferry, Hala Maksoud, Persis Khambatta, Penny Patterson"
1983	Miss Teen USA Pageant	Self - Judge	
1984	All-Star Family Feud Special	Self - Celebrity Contestant	"2nd Battle of the Perfect 10's: Bert's Beauties vs. Betty's Bruisers; Gordon's Glories vs. Gloria's Go-Getters"
1986	Hunter	Dhari Ziad	S2.E17: "62 Hrs. of Terror"
1986	MacGyver	Zia	S1.E17: "To Be a Man"
1986	Shingora	Roma Sinha	TV film
1987	The New Mike Hammer	Shandra	S3.E20: "A Blinding Fear"
1993	Lois & Clark: The New Adventures of Superman	Chairperson	S1.E1: "Pilot"
1998	Not a Nice Man to Know	Self - Guest	Final appearance
