= Flashes (film) =

- Directed by: Amir Valinia
- Written by: Andrew M. Henderson
- Story by: Andrew M. Henderson
- Produced by: Matt Keith
- Starring: Tom Sizemore; Christopher Judge; Donny Boaz; Elle LaMont; Anthony Omari; Deke Anderson; Johnny Walter
- Cinematography: Barry Strickland
- Edited by: Amir Valinia
- Music by: Sammy Huen
- Release date: 2015
- Running time: 1h 41min
- Country: United States
- Language: English

Flashes is a science fiction film by Amir Valinia. It stars Tom Sizemore, Christopher Judge, Donny Boaz, Elle LaMont, Anthony Omari, AnnMarie Giaquinto, Deke Anderson and Johnny Walter. A man has his perception of reality challenged as he goes through a series of realities.

== Story ==
The story is about a man who is happy with a contented life. Then things change that challenge his perception of reality. He ends up in three parallel lives. He just wants it to stop so he can get back to normality. In the three different realities the man goes through, he is an architect in one of them, a rock singer in another and in the third he is a killer. In order to find out what 's going on, he seeks the help of his psychologist who believes the problem may be because he is not taking his prescribed medication. It is also a complex love story with many sub-plots within.

== Background ==
The film is directed by Amir Valinia and the story was written by Andrew M. Henderson. In July, 2013, the film makers were looking for actors to fill the roles for the film. The film was originally called Flashes but a re-cut version was released as Alternate Realities. The film started out as a short but ended up becoming a feature-length film. The film was dedicated to Erika Cardenas who was the girlfriend of the director. She died five weeks before the release of the film.

The sound editor supervisor was Sammy Huen, and the music resulted in an award for Best Sound Design at the 2014 Action on Film International Film Festival.

== Cast ==
- Tom Sizemore as Detective Mark Hume
- Christopher Judge
- Elle LaMont as Clare Rotit
- Natalie Wilemon
- Donny Boaz
- Johnny Walter
- Danny Kamin
- Deke Anderson as Dr. Ryan Greene
- Bailey Vaughn McAndrew
- Lee Stringer
- Lydia Martinez
- Catherine Lawrence Kinslow
- Paula Marcenaro Solinger
- Dimitrius Pulido
- Kristin Cochell
- David DeLao
- Bonnie Gayle
- Erin Elizabeth Reed
- Joe Grisaffi
- Ann Elizabeth Arnett
- Rod Hermansen
- Lance Henry
- Thada Catalon
- Cara Cochran
- Anthony Omari
