= Speed (Billy Idol song) =

1994 single by Billy Idol

Single by Billy Idol

from the album Speed: Songs from and Inspired by the Motion Picture
- Released: 30 August 1994
- Recorded: 1994
- Studio: Los Angeles
- Length: 4:22 (single version)
- Label: Arista; Chrysalis
- Songwriters: Billy Idol; Steve Stevens
- Producers: Billy Idol; Ralph Sall; Steve Stevens

Billy Idol singles chronology
| "Wasteland" (1993) | "Speed" (1994) | "Don't You (Forget About Me)" (2001) |

"Speed" is a song by the English rock singer Billy Idol, originally included in the soundtrack of the eponymous film. It was written by him and guitarist Steve Stevens, and released in August 1994 as the film's main song through Arista Records worldwide and Chrysalis Records in the United States.

== Background ==
In early 1994, producers of the film Speed chose record producer Ralph Sall as music supervisor of the soundtrack. Sall was in charge of creating a concept album with a compilation of new and old songs in different genres and featuring diverse artists, with a theme similar to this action thriller film. The resulting soundtrack contains songs about speed, cars or travelling. Shortly after, Sall contacted Billy Idol and his close collaborator, guitarist Steve Stevens, to compose and record the film's main song with lyrics inspired by its plot.

By that time, Idol's career was convulsed and in full decline after the critical and financial failure with his album Cyberpunk (1993). In addition, he was facing economic differences with his record label (EMI), and his personal problems with drug abuse were on the rise. Thus, this new song was an important opportunity to return to his audience.

"Speed" was composed and recorded in a short time in Los Angeles with the support of an uncredited band, possibly completed with drummer Mark Schulman and bassist Larry Seymour (live members by that time). The song is based on a similar drum tempo and guitar riff that was the basis for Idol's "Rebel Yell" hit (1983), following the same formula in terms of feeling.

== Release and promotion ==
Arista Records released "Speed" on 7-inch vinyl, CD, and cassette in the United Kingdom on 30 August 1994. The single includes three different versions of the song and a live acoustic version of "Rebel Yell" (until then unreleased) only on the UK CD single release. The single was promoted with a music video that mixed some of the most vibrant scenes of the film along with a fictional live performance of Billy Idol, Steve Stevens and the rest of their rock band. On the US Billboard Album Rock Tracks chart, "Speed" peaked at number 38 on 23 July 1994. On the UK Singles Chart, it reached number 47 on 9 October that year, becoming Idol's last charting single in the UK. In 2008, the song was included in the compilation album The Very Best of Billy Idol: Idolize Yourself.

== Critical reception ==
Upon its release, Alan Jones from Music Week wrote that "this is a fairly bland Idol single which breezes along with the speed but none of the style of 'Rebel Yell'." David Quantick of NME described "Speed" as "an appropriately silly song" and "a great theme for a bloke who keeps coming off his bike". He added that the single includes a "hilariously pointless instrumental version" and an "acoustic version" of "Rebel Yell" with "loads of electric guitars on it and one acoustic guitar". uDiscoverMusic writer Tim Peacock described the song as "a chugging punk anthem with a suitably explosive chorus" and that it "represented a vintage return to form for Billy Idol" after Cyberpunk.

== Track listing ==
All tracks are written by Billy Idol and Steve Stevens.

| No. | Title | Length |
|---|---|---|
| 1. | "Speed" (single version) | 4:22 |
| 2. | "Speed" (extended version) | 5:22 |
| 3. | "Speed" (instrumental) | 5:23 |
| 4. | "Rebel Yell" (acoustic version) | 5:35 |

- Track 4 was recorded at the KROQ Acoustic Christmas concert on 11 December 1993 at the Universal Amphitheatre, Los Angeles. Recording by Westwood One Radio.

== Personnel ==
- Design – Jigsaw [London] Ltd.
- Engineering – Clif Norrell
- Engineering [Recording] – Biff Dawes (track four)
- Production – Billy Idol, Ralph Sall, Steve Stevens
- Writing – Billy Idol, Steve Stevens

== Charts ==
| Chart (1994) | Peak position |
|---|---|
| Australia (ARIA) | 33 |
| Europe (European Hit Radio) | 36 |
| Finland (The Official Finnish Charts) | 12 |
| France (SNEP) | 33 |
| New Zealand (Recorded Music NZ) | 40 |
| Sweden (Sverigetopplistan) | 39 |
| UK Singles (OCC) | 47 |
| US Album Rock Tracks (Billboard) | 38 |
