= Vivat! Vivat Regina! =

1970 play written by Robert Bolt

- First edition: Heinemann, 1971
- Original language: English
- Written by: Robert Bolt

Premiere
- Date: 20 May 1970
- Place: Chichester Festival Theatre

Vivat! Vivat Regina! (/ˈvaɪvæt rɪˈdʒaɪnə/ VY-vat rij-EYE-nə) is a play written by Robert Bolt. It debuted at Chichester in 1970 and later at the Piccadilly Theatre London. Principal actors were Sarah Miles and Eileen Atkins. The play was directed by Peter Dews and designed by Carl Toms. Richard Pearson also played a role. Later, the play had a successful run on Broadway in 1972.

The play tells the story of two rival monarchs who never met: Scotland's Mary, Queen of Scots and her cousin, Queen Elizabeth I of England. The play's title is Latin for "Long live! Long live the Queen!", and is taken from the acclamation at the Coronation Service.

The first act contrasts the personalities of the two monarchs, as they engage in a battle of wiles. Elizabeth is portrayed as a woman who has given up on love and family in order to maintain a firm grasp on power, while Mary is portrayed as a reckless, impulsive woman ready to risk power for love.

The second act concentrates on Mary's term as a prisoner of Elizabeth, during which time she reflected on her own pending execution.

Eileen Atkins played Elizabeth in the play's British and American debuts. Bolt's wife Sarah Miles played Mary in the original British production, while Claire Bloom played Mary in the play's Broadway debut. The 1972 Broadway production received four Tony Award nominations: Best Play, Best Actress in a Play (Eileen Atkins), Best Featured Actor in a Play (Douglas Rain), and Best Featured Actor in a Play (Lee Richardson).

A 1985 off-Broadway revival featured Geraldine Page as Elizabeth and Sabra Jones as Mary.

Janet McTeer as Elizabeth and Barbara Flynn as Mary headlined director Roy Marsden's 1995 revival of Vivat! Vivat Regina! which played the Mermaid Theatre from October 23 to November 25.

The play was, next to A Man for All Seasons, Bolt's most successful stage production, receiving several Tony nominations for its Broadway production.

== Awards and nominations ==
=== Original Broadway production ===
| Year | Award | Category | Nominee | Result |
|---|---|---|---|---|
| 1972 | Tony Award | Best Play | | Nominated |
| 1972 | Tony Award | Best Actress in a Play | Eileen Atkins | Nominated |
| 1972 | Tony Award | Best Featured Actor in a Play | Douglas Rain | Nominated |
| 1972 | Tony Award | Best Featured Actor in a Play | Lee Richardson | Nominated |
| 1972 | Drama Desk Award | Outstanding Performance | Eileen Atkins | Won |
