= Future Zone =

- Directed by: David A. Prior
- Written by: David A. Prior
- Produced by: Kimberley Casey; David Winters
- Starring: David Carradine; Ted Prior
- Cinematography: Voya Mikulic
- Edited by: Russ Kingston
- Music by: John W. Morgan; William Stromberg
- Release date: 1990
- Running time: 82 minutes
- Country: United States
- Language: English

Future Zone is a 1990 science-fiction film written and directed by David A. Prior and starring David Carradine. It is the sequel to the 1989 film Future Force.

== Synopsis ==
John Tucker, a bounty hunter, comes face to face with the most dangerous ordeal of his career but he is armed (unknowingly) with his most powerful weapon yet, his son, who travels back in time to save him from a brutal gang of criminals.

== Cast ==
- David Carradine as John Tucker
- Ted Prior as Billy Tucker
- Patrick Culliton as Hoffman
- Gail Jensen as Marion Tucker
- Charles Napier as Mickland
- Renée Cline as Cindi
- Ronald Taft as Dugan (credited as Ron Taft)
- Jackson Bostwick as Tony Ginetti
- Dave Scott as Monroe
- Rose Stabler as Laura Kincade
- Don Stewart as Richards
- Danielle Lamprakes as Barbi
- Townsend Ellis as Williams

== Production ==
Future Zone was Whit Norris' first ever feature film as sound mixer.

== Reception ==
Creature Feature gave the movie 2 of 5 stars.
