= Cisse Cameron =

American television and film actress

- Cameron in The Ted Knight Show, 1978
- Born: January 5, 1954 (age 72); United States
- Other names: Cissy Cameron; Cissie Colpitts; Cissy Colpitts; Celea Ann Cole
- Occupation: Actress
- Spouse: Reb Brown (m. 1979)

Cisse Cameron Colpitts, best known as Cisse Cameron (born January 5, 1954) is an American television and film actress.

== Career ==
Cameron made her film debut in Billy Jack (1971). She played Sally Hooper in BOOM BOOM ROOM at Lincoln Center's Vivian Beaumont Theater for the 1973 New York Shakespeare Festival.

In 1974, she played the title role in a summer stock tour of Sugar, starring Alan Sues. She also appeared in guest roles on television shows such as The Love Boat, Alice, Too Close for Comfort, and Three's Company.

In 1978, she appeared on The Phil Donahue Show to promote The Ted Knight Show.

Her most notable film role is Dr. Lea Jansen in the 1988 science fiction film Space Mutiny, which was used in a 1997 episode of Mystery Science Theater 3000.

== Personal life ==
Cameron married actor Reb Brown in 1979, with whom she later co-starred in Space Mutiny.

== Filmography ==
Film
Year	Title	Role	Notes
1971	Billy Jack	Miss False Eyelashes	Credited as Cissie Colpitts
1976	Blood Stalkers	Jeri	
1977	The Happy Hooker Goes to Washington	Miss Goodbody	Credited as Cissy Colpitts
1979	The Prize Fighter	Polly	
1980	The Baltimore Bullet	Sugar	
1981	Hard Country	Royce's wife	
1983	Porky's II: The Next Day	Sandy Le Toi	
1983	Three's Company	Melody Wilson	
1988	Space Mutiny	Dr. Lea Jansen	Credited as Cissy Cameron
1997	The Deli	Mrs. Cavallo	(final film role)
Television
Year	Title	Role	Notes
1977	Switch	Charlotte Braverman	1 episode
1977	Laverne & Shirley	Dolores	1 episode
1978	The Ted Knight Show	Graziella	6 episodes
1978	The Love Boat	Amber	2 episodes 1978 and 1985
1982	Alice	Bonnie	1 episode
1983	Too Close for Comfort	Bambi	1 episode
1983	Three's Company	Melody Wilson	1 episode
1984	The Ratings Game	Wendy	Television movie
