= White Fury =

- Directed by: David A. Prior
- Written by: David A. Prior
- Produced by: Kimberley Casey
- Starring: Deke Anderson; Sean Holton; Douglas Harter; Christine Shinn; William Berg; Chasity Hammons
- Cinematography: Brian D. Veatch
- Edited by: Lawrence Simeone
- Music by: Tony Cappelli; Charles Shepard
- Release date: 11 December 1990 (Video premiere)
- Running time: 84 mins
- Country: United States
- Language: English

White Fury is a 1990 suspense action film directed by David A. Prior and starring Deke Anderson, Sean Holton, Douglas Harter, Christine Shinn and William Berg. It was produced by Kimberley Casey.

== Story ==
The film stars Deke Anderson in the lead role as Tyler, a bank robber and criminal who along with accomplice Marcus (Played by Michael Kaskel), are on the run. Danny is champion snowboarder who along with his girlfriend Christine and friends Greg and Lesley decide to take a break from the daily grind and head out of town and relax in a cabin out in the snowy Colorado wilderness. Things change for the young holiday makers when during a blizzard they end up becoming victims. The two ruthless criminals Tyler and Marcus end up taking the cabin's occupants hostage. In addition to some snowboarding in the film, a rocket-launcher is also featured.

== Cast ==
- Deke Anderson ... Tyler
- Sean Holton ... Danny
- Douglas Harter ... Martin Towers
- Christine Shinn ... Christine
- William Berg ... Greg
- Chasity Hammons ... Lesley
- Michael Kaskel ... Marcus
- John Clauson ... Marvin
- James Milholland ... Detective
- James M. Cimbura ... Shop Owner
- Kipp Lockwood ... Officer
- John Stadler ... Ranger #1
- Frank Mancini ... Ranger #2
- Ken Westover ... Ranger #3
- John von Neumann ... Bank Manager
- Jolene Chavan ... Bank Teller
- Jill Webb ... Bank Teller
- Peggy Crohan ... Bank Teller
- Sandie Sanderberg ... Bank Personnel
- Chris Bennett ... Bank Personnel
- Jacqueline Carbone ... Bank Customer
- David A. Churchill ... Bank Customer
- Sand Baker ... Bank Customer
- Dan M. Alder ... Bank Customer
- Rusty Sandberg ... Bank Customer
- Tom Hartleb ... Bank Customer
- Deborah Sclar ... Bank Customer
- Brian Roberts ... Bank Customer
- Douglas G. Price ... Bank Customer
- Jennifer Perkins ... Bank Customer
- Robb Kyuik ... Race Crowd Extra
- Norm McGinnis ... Race Crowd Extra
- Theodore P. Sager ... Race Crowd Extra
- A.B. Kutchinsky ... Race Crowd Extra
- Daniel Fitzpatrick ... Race Crowd Extra
- Kit Graham ... Race Crowd Extra
- Charles Rools ... Race Crowd Extra
- Francie Bosley ... Race Crowd Extra
- Gwendolyn Scully ... Race Crowd Extra
- Shana Burch ... Race Crowd Extra
- Jodie Skalla ... Race Crowd Extra
- Suzanne Diaz ... Race Crowd Extra
- Ann Winslow ... Race Crowd Extra

== Crew ==
- Director ... David A. Prior
- Producers ... Kimberley Casey, Bruce Lewin
- Writers ... David A. Prior, John Cianetti
- Editor ... Lawrence L. Simeone
