= Tiger Warsaw =

1988 film by Amin Q. Chaudhri

- Directed by: Amin Q. Chaudhri
- Written by: Roy London
- Produced by: Amin Q. Chaudhri
- Starring: Patrick Swayze; Barbara Williams; Lee Richardson; Mary McDonnell; Bobby DiCicco; Piper Laurie
- Cinematography: Robert Draper
- Edited by: Brian Smedley-Aston
- Music by: Ernest Troost
- Production company: Continental Film Group Ltd.
- Distributed by: Sony Pictures
- Release date: September 23, 1988
- Running time: 93 minutes
- Country: United States
- Language: English
- Budget: $2 million
- Box office: $422,627

Tiger Warsaw is a 1988 American drama film directed by Amin Q. Chaudhri, written by Roy London, starring Patrick Swayze. It was produced by Continental Film Group.

== Plot ==
Chuck "Tiger" Warsaw (Swayze) brought sorrow to his family fifteen years earlier when he shot his father Michael (Lee Richardson) and made him a semi-invalid. After fifteen years of self-destruction, Tiger returns home to the steel production community of Sharon to seek forgiveness.

== Cast ==
- Patrick Swayze as Chuck "Tiger" Warsaw
- Piper Laurie as Frances Warsaw
- Lee Richardson as Michael Warsaw
- Mary McDonnell as Paula Warsaw
- Barbara Williams as Karen
- Bobby DiCicco as Tony
- Jenny Chrisinger as Val
- James Patrick Gillis as Roger
- Michelle Glaven as Emily
- Kevin Bayer as Robin
- Beeson Carroll as Uncle Gene
- Sally-Jane Heit as Aunt Barbara
- Kaye Ballard as Aunt Thelma
- Thomas Mills Wood as Lt. Fontana
- Cynthia Lammel as Paula's secretary
- Steve Jaklic as Kid in Womb

== Production ==
The outside of the "Buhl Mansion" in the film was actually the Buhl Casino founded in the early 1910s by Frank H. Buhl on his 300-acre farm that he turned into a park and donated it to the people of the Shenango Valley for families to come and enjoy.

The distribution rights of the movie was purchased in early 1988 by Sony Video Software Company, who released the film under the Sony Pictures label (no relation to the company that got its name after renaming from Columbia Pictures Entertainment) in 1991.

== Marketing ==
The film was advertised with the tagline "Years ago he shattered his life. Now he's back to pick up the pieces.

== Reception ==
The film only grossed $422,667 in the United States upon its spring 1988 release.
