= Nightside (film) =

- Genre: Drama
- Written by: Stephen J. Cannell; Glen A. Larson
- Directed by: Bernard L. Kowalski
- Starring: Doug McClure; Michael Cornelison; John de Lancie; Joe Spinell
- Theme music composer: John Andrew Tartaglia
- Country of origin: United States
- Original language: English

Production
- Executive producers: Stephen J. Cannell; Glen A. Larson
- Producers: Alex Beaton; Dean Zanetos
- Cinematography: Arthur R. Botham
- Editors: David Howe; Neil MacDonald; Gene Ranney
- Running time: 78 min.
- Production companies: Glen A. Larson Productions; Stephen J. Cannell Productions; Universal Television

Original release
- Network: ABC
- Release: June 8, 1980

Nightside is a 1980 television pilot starring Doug McClure.

== Plot ==
Television pilot about the adventures of a streetwise cop working the night shift in Los Angeles with a naive partner.
