= Sorcery (video game) =

2012 video game

- Developer: The Workshop (Note: Additional work by Santa Monica Studio.)
- Publisher: Sony Computer Entertainment
- Directors: Peter T. Akemann; Christian Rossi
- Designers: Joseph A. Unger; Dan Rubenfield
- Artists: Christopher M. Hunt; Joakim Wejdemar
- Composer: Mark Mancina
- Engine: Unreal Engine 3
- Platform: PlayStation 3
- Release: NA: May 22, 2012; EU: May 23, 2012; JP: June 14, 2012
- Genre: Action-adventure
- Mode: Single-player

Sorcery (known as Lord of Sorcery in Japan) is an action-adventure video game developed by The Workshop and published by Sony Computer Entertainment for the PlayStation 3. It utilizes the PlayStation Move controller.

== Plot ==
Players take the role of a young sorcerer's apprentice, named Finn, and must master the arcane arts in order to protect his homeland. The Nightmare Queen has broken the ancient pact with mankind and threatens to cover the land in eternal night, sending her foul minions across the land. Finn, together with the magical cat Erline, must travel through the dark Faerie Kingdoms to save the land from the darkness that has enshrouded it. The world is based on Irish mythology.

== Gameplay ==
The player casting a spell as numerous enemies surround Finn

The game features 5 elemental spells (Earth, Ice, Fire, Wind and Lightning), as well as Finn's standard Arcane Bolt attack and context-sensitive spells such as Telekinesis. Also included are dozens of potions and numerous other items to collect. Players must defeat various enemies, solve puzzles and craft new potions as they progress through the game. Players must use the PlayStation Move to cast magic spells to attack enemies and brew elixirs. Players must journey throughout the Faerie Kingdom, recover ancient knowledge from the City of the Drowned and aid the local townsfolk.

== Reception ==
Reception

Aggregate score
Aggregator	Score
Metacritic	70/100

Review scores
Publication	Score
Eurogamer	7/10
GameSpot	4.5/10
IGN	7.5/10
Push Square	7/10

Sorcery received "mixed or average" reviews, according to review aggregator Metacritic. Most reviews praise it for its great use of the PlayStation Move, and nice visual style. A common complaint is that the game has a length of 8 hours and lack of replay value.
