= Elle LaMont =

American actresses

- Born: Texas, U.S.
- Occupation: Actress
- Years active: 2007–present

Elle LaMont is an American film and television actress. Her roles include Screwhead in the film Alita: Battle Angel. She is also known for the films Strings, Mercy Black, Iron Lung and Flay.

== Filmography ==
=== Film ===
Year	Title	Role	Notes
2007	A Night to Remember	Kimberly	Short film
2008	Top Story	Sawtooth Slasher	Short film
2010	Upon a Midnight Clear	PSP Announcer	
2010	The Devil's Gravestone	Jaq	
2011	Blacktino	Detective Andrews	
2011	Recess	Ms. Ellis	Short film
2011	Strings	Chavine	
2013	Machete Kills	"Dollface"	
2013	Music Therapy	Linnie	
2014	Two Step	The Cantina Bartender	
2014	The Furies	Tish	Short film
2014	The Wisdom to Know the Difference	Candy	
2014	Varsity Blood	Diane Sanchez	
2014	Dead Still	Ivy Monroe	
2014	Flashes	Clare Rotit	
2015	Petting Zoo	Dr. Longoria	
2015	Hit Call	The Woman	Short film
2015	Pictures at an Exhibition	Stilt Violinist	Short film
2015	Sorrow	Preppy Girl	
2015	Fingerguns: The Movie	Lisa Armstrong	Short film
2015	Into Memory	Katie	Short film
2015	El Güey	La Llorona	
2016	Second Impression	Kiera Garza	
2017	Beyond Violet	Violet	Short film
2018	The Next Kill	Natalie Hershlag	
2018	People with Issues	Hipster Chick	
2018	Sanitatum	Lily Brandon	
2019	Pegasus: Pony with a Broken Wing	Emily	
2019	Alita: Battle Angel	Screwhead	
2019	Mercy Black	Alice Hess	
2019	Flay	Moon Crane	
2020	No Chance	Dr. Dawn Bergmann	
2026	Iron Lung	SM-8 Research Assistant / The Whisper	

=== Television ===
Year	Title	Role	Note
2012	Prescribed	Victoria	3 episodes
2012	Watching You	Denise	TV movie
2014	From Dusk till Dawn: The Series	Karina	3 episodes
2015	VAAC Army	Spearmint	1 Episode
2015	Under Nitrous	Marybeth	1 Episode
2021	Salvage Marines	Boss Maggie Taggart	
