= The Undertaker (1988 film) =

- Film poster
- Directed by: Frank Avianca (as Franco Steffanino)
- Written by: William James Kennedy
- Produced by: Frank Avianca; Steve Bono
- Starring: Joe Spinell; Rebeca Yaron; Susan Bachli
- Cinematography: Richard E. Brooks
- Edited by: Larry Marinelli; David Szulkin
- Music by: J. Eric Johnson
- Production company: Double Helix Films
- Distributed by: Double Helix Films; Code Red
- Release date: October 2010
- Running time: 89 minutes
- Country: United States
- Language: English

The Undertaker (also released as Death Merchant) is an American slasher film directed by Frank Avianca and starring Joe Spinell. The film was completed in November 1988, but was never released for the public and existed only in an incomplete form. The Undertaker was later reedited for a DVD release by Code Red in 2010 and a Blu-ray release by Vinegar Syndrome in 2016. The film is considered a cult classic, due in part to both Joe Spinell's involvement and its troubled production. This was Joe Spinell's last film before his premature death in 1989.

== Plot ==
A woman driving through rural New York gets a flat tire. She accepts a ride from a biker, but he takes them to the woods and tries assaulting her. She fights him off and runs to the nearby road, accepting a ride from a mortician. He later kills her, and fondles her dead body.

He soon kills another woman by injecting her with poison. The killer is local mortician Roscoe Howard (Joe Spinell), who has the second victim brought to his funeral home. Roscoe keeps his victims in plastic bags hung up in his basement.

Nick Leonard is a local college student, and Roscoe is his uncle. One morning before class, Nick eavesdrops on his uncle talking to the corpses he prepares. He makes a sound, alerting his uncle, but runs away before he is caught. He bumps into Roscoe’s wife Hazel, and she tells Roscoe, who puts his nephew in his sights.

In class, the teacher, Pam Hayes (Rebeca Yaron), tells of the history of necrophilia, and says that more cases were reported in the United States than anywhere else. After class, Nick tries asking Ms. Hayes to accompany him to his uncle’s funeral parlor, but she declines, thinking he is hitting on her.

That night, Ms. Hayes tells her roommate Mandy (Susan Bachli) about Nick’s invitation, then exercises. She is called by Nick, who talks her into going to his uncle’s funeral home while he is out. They sneak into his office, but don’t find anything, and are almost caught by his aunt.

Roscoe goes to the movies, stalking a woman as she leaves the theater. She is picked up by her boyfriend, and Roscoe sets his sights on another woman. He follows her home, then kills her by tying her up between two trees and gutting her with a knife. Nick has a nightmare, reliving an experience from his childhood where his uncle forced him to touch a corpse. Snooping in the basement, he confronts his uncle, who ties him up and murders him.

Ms. Hayes notices Nick is absent from her class the next day, and a jogger finds the scene of the previous murder. Police Inspector Barry is called to handle the murder cases. The manager of the local movie theater is convinced the killer is following scenes from the horror film he shows. He plans on catching the killer when he returns to the theater to watch the movie again.

Roscoe learns of Ms. Hayes’ break-in from Hazel. He phones the college administration building, pretending to be a police officer working a case, and gains Ms. Hayes’ address from the receptionist. Nick's girlfriend Angela shows up, concerned about his disappearance, but Roscoe assures her he will turn up soon. Roscoe breaks into a woman’s home, thinking she is Ms. Hayes, and kills her by stabbing her with a knife, and burning her face on the stove. Ms. Hayes turns out to have been next door.

The theater manager follows Roscoe to his funeral parlor and recognizes him from the theater. Chief Banes and Inspector Barry piece together the murders, and Angela reports Nick’s disappearance. That night, the theater manager is killed in his car by Roscoe.

The next day, Ms. Hayes calls the police, and tells them to go to Roscoe’s funeral parlor. Inspector Barry and another detective interview Roscoe, who fakes tears as he tells a false story implicating Nick for the murders. Roscoe later murders the two detectives. Ms. Hayes’ roommate Mandy investigates the funeral parlor. She runs into Roscoe, who kills her. He takes a picture of her corpse, which he pins to a cork-board with pictures of his other victims. As Roscoe is going through Mandy’s wallet, he finds her keys. As he prepares to go after Ms. Hayes, Nick’s corpse comes alive and strangles him to death.

== Cast ==
- Joe Spinell as Roscoe
- Rebeca Yaron as Pam Hayes
- Susan Bachli as Mandy
- Martha Somoeman as Hazel
- Charles Kay-Hune as Police Chief
- William James Kennedy as Inspector Barry
- France Porta as Security Guard
- Joel Nagle as Kevin
- Max Stone as Sergeant
- Ginny Franco as Mary Lawrence
- Lisa Vondal as Nancy Bowen
- Rita Kling as Angela
- Jan Harrison as Cashier
- Mette Holt as Jean
- Robert Kessler as Inspector Vance
- Guillermo Gentile as State Coroner
- Tommy LoRusso as Coroner Driver

== Production ==
The film was made on location in Port Chester, New York at the former Colony Funeral Home on King Street and was produced by Double Helix Films. Filming for The Undertaker was completed in November 1988. Frank Avianca directed the film under his pseudonym Franco Steffanino.

== Release ==
The film was never released theatrically or on home video, and the only known copy was reportedly in the possession of the film's editor, Lorenzo Marinelli.. According to a post on Joe Spinell's Official Instagram account, Marinelli screened the film for Joe Spinell's friend Sal Sirchia in 1989 and permitted him to make a VHS copy. This copy subsequently circulated among tape traders for many years and served as the sole known means by which the film could be viewed, until October 2010 when Code Red finally released an edited version of the film on DVD. The release was padded with public domain films to increase running time, was titled Death Merchant in the opening titles, and scenes were both cut and rearranged from the bootleg version.

In 2016, Vinegar Syndrome restored and released The Undertaker in a Blu-ray/DVD combo pack limited to 3,000 copies. Unlike the Code Red release, the Vinegar Syndrome version does not include the public domain films edited in to pad the running time.
