= She-Wolves of the Wasteland =

- Theatrical poster
- Directed by: Robert Hayes
- Written by: Robert Hayes; Dan Rotblatt
- Produced by: Peter Yuval
- Starring: Persis Khambatta; Kathleen Kinmont; Peggy McIntaggart
- Cinematography: Paul Maibaum
- Edited by: Brian Evans
- Music by: Dan Radlauer
- Distributed by: Action International
- Release date: 1988
- Running time: 89 minutes
- Country: United States
- Language: English

She-Wolves of the Wasteland, also known as Phoenix the Warrior, is a 1988 American post apocalyptic film directed by Robert Hayes and starring Persis Khambatta, Kathleen Kinmont and Peggy McIntaggart.

== Synopsis ==
Following a world war fought with biological agents, it is believed that all men and most women on the planet have been killed. The Reverend Mother (Sheila Howard) aims to prevent human extinction by creating a race of superwomen through controlled sperm banks. The effects of the war have left the world a post-apocalyptic wasteland. Unbeknownst to most, the Reverend Mother orchestrated the elimination of surviving men to seize global power.

A pregnant woman named Keela flees the breeding facility and goes on the run with Phoenix, a sand tracker who rescues her. Although the Reverend Mother desires only female offspring, the breeding facility's leaders oppose this female-only policy. Eight years after giving birth to a male child, the Reverend Mother's forces capture the boy and abandon Keela and Phoenix to die.

However, they are rescued by a bounty hunter named Neon. Moreover, they encounter a man who may be the last male on Earth. The group of women fights to save the male child by assaulting the Reverend Mother's fortress.

== Cast ==
- Persis Khambatta as "Cobalt"
- Kathleen Kinmont as "Phoenix"
- Peggy McIntaggart (also known as Peggy Sands) as Keela
- James H. Emery as Guy
- Sheila Howard as Reverend Mother / Badger
- Nina Jaffe as "Chainsaw"
- Courtney Caldwell as Motorcycle Woman / "T-Bird"
- Skyler Corbett as Skyler
- Lore de Nuccio as "Neon"
- Linda Santo as "Snapper"
- B.B. Bowen as "Ginsu"
- Maria Michi as Escaping Sister
- Kathy Armstrong as The Bartender / Arena Announcer
- Roxanne Kernohan as Meda
- Pippa Danyon as "Rattail"
- Dusty Woods as "Mohawk"
- Kastle as Psycho Chick
- Isis Richardson as "Riptide"
- Veronica Carothers as "Suga"
- Miranda Fredericks as "Dreadlock"
- Susan Overman as "Blondie"
- Ginger Justin as Orange Hair
- Barbara Buck as Slave
- Bonita Money as Snake Dancer
- Marta May as Prostitute
- Buffy Fletcher as Head Rezule
- Andy Harrington as Second Rezule
- Kimberley Casey as "Scratch" / Rezule Warrior

== Releases ==
It debuted on VHS in 1988 with the title Phoenix the Warrior.

Echo Bridge Entertainment released it on DVD in the US on November 6, 2007.

As of July 2023, it is available for streaming in the Amazon service.

== Reception ==
TV Guide found the plot to be skimpy but still recommended the film. Patrick J. Mullen of As Vast as Space and as Timeless as Infinity wrote that, while he found the premise interesting, the movie did little with it.
