= Meridian Entertainment Group =

- Industry: Producing; Promotion; Consulting
- Founded: 2017
- Founder: Kevin Meyer; Brad Coombs; Rick Shimel; Don Middlebrook
- Headquarters: Lansing, Michigan, United States
- Website: http://www.meridianconcerts.com/

Meridian Entertainment Group. (MEG) is a live music entertainment company that promotes and produces live concert events throughout different locations across America. The company also provides support for such events that includes, talent buying expertise and consultation, extensive marketing experience, advance and on-site production support, sponsorship connections, and overall event related guidance.

== History ==
Meridian Entertainment Group ceased business in December 2017, and transitioned into Meridian Entertainment Inc (MEI).

== Clients ==
=== Venue List ===
- Common Ground Music Festival (Lansing, MI)
- Cavendish Beach Music Festival (Prince Edward Island, Canada)
- Legendary Buffalo Chip Campground (Sturgis, SD)
- National Cherry Festival (Traverse City, MI)
- On the Waterfront Festival (Rockford, IL)
- Rock the Rapids (Grand Rapids, MI)
- Charlottetown Summerfest (Prince Edward Island, Canada)
