= Future Force (film) =

- Directed by: David A. Prior
- Written by: David A. Prior
- Produced by: Kimberley Casey
- Starring: David Carradine; Anna Rapagna
- Cinematography: Andrew Parke
- Edited by: Paul O'Bryan
- Music by: Tim James; Steve McClintock; Mark Mancina
- Production company: Action International Pictures
- Release date: November 1989 (United States)
- Running time: 84 minutes

Future Force is a 1989 science-fiction film written and directed by David A. Prior and starring David Carradine. A 1990 sequel to the film was made called Future Zone.

== Synopsis ==
At some point in the near future (around 1993), law enforcement has become so ineffective that the only real hope for justice is an organization of bounty hunters known as C.O.P.S. (Civilian Operated Police Systems). John Tucker (David Carradine), a Los Angeles bounty hunter sporting a metal arm piece capable of shooting lasers, is hired to protect a woman reporter, Marion Sims (Anna Rapagna), from a gang of renegade cops.

While Tucker is more interested in right defeating wrong than in payment for his services, he has become a bitter, washed up, drunken man due to all the corruption he has seen. Reporter Sims has uncovered proof of the corruption and ineffectiveness of the C.O.P.S system. Unfortunately, the bounty organization is run by a man, Adams, who is also corrupt, and who turns the C.O.P.S organization. Tucker works to save Sims, but many of the bounty hunters from C.O.P.S are after her. When it becomes apparent that Tucker is now helping Sims, a bounty is put on his head as well.

Aiding Tucker and Sims is their ally, Billy, who is a computer genius who utilizes a wheelchair.

== Cast ==
- David Carradine as Tucker
- Robert Tessier as Becker
- Anna Rapagna as Marion
- William Zipp as Adams
- Patrick Culliton as Grimes
- Dawn Wildsmith as Roxanne
- D.C. Douglas as Billy
- Kimberley Casey as Alicia

== Release ==
Future Force was released direct-to-video in the United States by A.I.P. in November 1989.

== Reception and legacy ==
From contemporary reviews, "Lor." of Variety reviewed the AIP video cassette on November 12, 1989. "Lor." noted that the film "offers some offbeat social commentary in its sci-fi approach to the future of law enforcement" and that the film "is low-tech but scores high in imagination."

Creature Feature gave the movie 2.5 out of five stars, praising the performance of Carradine, but found little else likeable in the film. The film has a score of 14% at Rotten Tomatoes.

The movie was also spoofed by RiffTrax on July 27, 2012.

== See also ==
Films in similar vein:

- R.O.T.O.R.
- Robocop
