= Deke Anderson =

American actor (born 1959)

- Born: Dee Christian Anderson; March 16, 1959 (age 67); Reno, Nevada, United States
- Occupations: Actor, acting coach
- Years active: 1988–present

Deke Anderson (born March 16, 1959, in Reno, Nevada) is an American television and film actor and former body builder. Active from around the mid-1990s, he has had lead and supporting roles in some actioners earlier on in his career. He had a role as Eddie Reed in the soap opera The Days of Our Lives, and has appeared in General Hospital and Cheers. He is also known for later television work as Rick Dresden in Devious Maids and as Detective Johnson in Dreamsville. He played the part of Chief Stevens in Wayne Slaten's 2018 film Osprey. He has also worked as an acting coach in later years.

== Background ==
Prior to becoming an actor, Anderson was employed at a gym in Reno, Nevada. A co-worker by the name of Kane Hodder encouraged him to become a film actor. His earliest acting was as a singer with the Nevada Opera Guild.

Anderson runs Next Level Acting Studios which is located in The Woodlands, Texas. In 2001, Anderson was voted the no.1 acting coach in LA.

One of his earliest film roles was the 1990 film White Fury in which he had the lead role.

== Career ==
=== 1980s ===
His earliest role was in the 1984 beach comedy Hardbodies, appearing as a bodybuilder. The following year he was in the film American Drive-In, playing the part of Denna's Boyfriend. In 1987, Force of Darkness, a film about a possessed man which starred Mel Novak, Doug Shanklin, Loren Cedar, and Eddie Hailey was released. He appeared in the film playing the part of a punk hoodlum. In 1988, he appeared in an episode of Cheers, "To All The Girls I've Loved Before" playing the part of Randy, a male stripper who gets the eye of Lilith after she fails to get s message from Frasier that their wedding is on.

In 1989, Anderson took on the role of Eddie Reed in The Days of Our Lives which was previously played by Robert Parucha from 1988 to 1989. He had a reoccurring role in the series until the Eddie Reed character was killed off. Around that time he appeared as the bandaged-up Duke Lavery in General Hospital. There was speculation (as indicated by an articles in the Bluefield Daily Telegraph & Index Journal ) that Anderson could possibly carry on in the role as Lavery as Ian Buchanan who played Lavery had left the show.

== Career ==
=== 1990s ===
He had a supporting role in A Cry in the Wild, which starred Jared Rushton, Ned Beatty and Pamela Sue Martin. The film was a made for television adaptation of Gary Paulsen's novel Hatchet, a story about a 13-year-old boy learning to survive in the wilderness. Anderson had a supporting role in the "Deep in the Heart of Dixie" episode of The Adventures of Brisco County, Jr. which aired on November 5, 1993.

In 1990, Anderson had the main starring role in as bank robber Tyler Bennet in the David A. Prior directed actioner White Fury, a story about two criminals who are on the run and terrorize four young adults who they find in a cabin in snowy Colorado wilderness. He played the part of Jason in the interactive movie video game Night Trap which was released in 1992. He appeared as Jason, a law enforcement colleague of Kelli who meets a tragic end in the game.

In 1994, he appeared in another David A. Prior directed film Felony, in a supporting role playing the part of Dennis. Jeffrey Combs, Ashley Laurence, Charles Napier, Lance Henriksen and Joe Don Baker also starred in the film.

He co-starred alongside Joe Estevez in the William Burke directed Psychic Detectives which was released in 1996.

=== 2000s ===
Anderson had a voice acting role in the 2016 film, Legends of the Dark King: A Fist of the North Star Story as Igor.

He played the part of 4 Star General Caven in The Green Lantern which was released in 2011.

By 2008, Anderson and his wife had opened their second studio, which was Woodlands branch of Next Level Acting Studios. One of the students to come out of the studio was an Australian called Jake Staines. Stains, a local businessman competed for and was chosen over 200 other actors to land a featured role in a Ford-150 truck commercial which played during the Super Bowl.

In the 2010 anime anthology film, Halo Legends, he voices as Spartan 1337 in the segment, "Odd One Out".

He appeared as Paul Robinson in "Identity Crisis", an episode of The Resident that aired in February 2018.

In the 2017 series Dreamsville, Anderson played Chief Brian Johnson, an honest Houston cop who is involved in the "war on drugs".

== Partial filmography ==
Television shows
Show	Episode	Role	Director	Year	Notes #
Webster	"Our Song"	Victor	Lee Bernhardi	1988	
Webster	"The Four Tops: The Sequel"		Lee Bernhardi	1988	
Cheers	"To All the Girls I've Loved Before"	Randy	James Burrows	1988	
Days of Our Lives	Various episodes	Eddie Reed		1989	Reoccurring role
The Adventures of Brisco County, Jr.	"Deep in the Heart of Dixie"	Simkins	Joe Napolitano	1993	
The Show	"Tom and Them"	Doug Dietrich		1996	
The Show	"The Script Formerly Known As..."	Doug Dietrich		1996	
Friday Night Lights	"Are You Ready for Friday Night?"	ER Doctor	Seith Mann	2007	
The Lying Game	"Double Dibs"	Randall Webster	Michael Grossman	2011	
25 and Married	Dream Spouse	Dan	Stephen Wolfe	2013	
25 and Married	"Anniversary - Part 2"	Nick's Dad	Stephen Wolfe	2013	
Drop Dead Diva	"Identity Crisis"	Joel Schall	Robert J. Wilson	2014	
Dallas	"Boxed In"	Bill Weathers	Rodney Charters	2014	
Devious Maids	"You Can't Take It with You"	Rick Dresden	John Scott	2014	
Devious Maids	"Suspicion"	Rick Dresden	David Warren	2015	
Devious Maids	"Much Ado About Buffing"	Rick Dresden	Victor Nelli Jr.	2016	
Devious Maids	"I Saw the Shine"	Rick Dresden	Elodie Keene	2016	
Dreamsville	"Pilot"	Detective Johnson	David Nguyen, Shannon Washington	2018	
Dreamsville	"Ambition Is a Deadly Disease"	Detective Johnson	David Nguyen, Shannon Washington	2018	
Dreamsville	"Danny the Deadly"	Detective Johnson	David Nguyen, Shannon Washington	2018	
Dreamsville	"Battle Tested"	Detective Johnson	David Nguyen, Shannon Washington	2018	
Dreamsville	"Divided We Are"	Detective Johnson	David Nguyen, Shannon Washington	2018	
Dreamsville	"Execution"	Detective Johnson	David Nguyen, Shannon Washington	2018	
Dreamsville	"Habituation"	Detective Johnson	David Nguyen, Shannon Washington	2018	
Dreamsville	"Pain Is Weakness"	Detective Johnson	David Nguyen, Shannon Washington	2018	
The Resident	"Identity Crisis	Paul Robinson	Bill D'Elia	2018	
Sons of Thuinder	"Episode #1.4"	Richard	Loren F. Gilley	2019	

Film
Film	Role	Director	Year	Notes #
White Fury	Tyler	David A. Prior	1990	Main role
Felony	Dennis	David A. Prior	1994	
Fist of Justice	Porter	Kim Bass	1995	
Psychic Detectives	Reno	William Burke	1996	Made for television
Balls Out: Gary the Tennis Coach	Gil Houseman	Danny Leiner	2009	
Cook County		David Pomes	2009	
Green Lantern	Four Star General Caven	Martin Campbell	2011	
Atrocity	Frank Coleman	Jeff S. Chimenti	2014	
Rogue Strike	Russian Submarine Captain	Kerry Beyer	2014	
Flashes	Dr. Ryan Greene	Amir Valinia	2015	
Mission Control	Donald	Jeremy Podeswa	2017	Made for television
Osprey	Chief Stevens	Wayne Slaten	2018	
