= Deadly Prey =

1987 action film

- VHS cover
- Directed by: David A. Prior
- Screenplay by: David A. Prior
- Story by: Richard Connell
- Produced by: Peter Yuval
- Starring: Cameron Mitchell; Troy Donahue; Ted Prior
- Cinematography: Stephen Ashley Blake
- Edited by: Brian Evans
- Music by: Tim Heintz; Tim James; Steven McClintock
- Production company: Sony Video Software Company; Action International Pictures
- Distributed by: Action International Pictures
- Release date: November 2, 1987
- Running time: 88 minutes
- Country: United States
- Language: English

Deadly Prey is a 1987 action film written and directed by David A. Prior. The film is a loose adaptation of the short story "The Most Dangerous Game" by Richard Connell, and stars Ted Prior (director David Prior's brother) as a former soldier who is kidnapped for participation in a human safari.

== Plot ==
Colonel John Hogan is a highly decorated Special Forces officer who leads a group of mercenaries. His current client is businessman Don Michaelson. A deal is struck, and Hogan recruits new troops; for training, Hogan orders them to kidnap civilians for use as targets in hunting exercises. One of the people they kidnap, Sergeant Mike Danton, is ambushed and captured while taking out the trash. He is outfitted in jorts, greased up, and released in a nearby forest as game.

A team of mercenaries hunt Danton; however, Danton, a highly-skilled Vietnam War veteran, picks off the troops one by one. The surviving troops report their difficulties to Hogan, who sends a task force led by his best man, Captain Thorton. Another member of the task force is Danton's former comrade Jack Cooper, whose life Danton saved in combat some years earlier. Recognizing each other, Cooper defects from the mercenaries and allies with Danton.

With Cooper's help, Danton continues to fight off the mercenaries with the goal of returning to his beloved wife Jaimy, who is eventually taken hostage by Hogan. Intending to rescue her, Danton escapes from the forest, equips for battle at his home, and storms the mercenaries' training camp. Danton and Cooper manage to eliminate all of the mercenaries, but in the end Thorton catches up with Jaimy and Cooper and murders them. Thorton is in turn pursued by a vengeful Danton, who chops off the captain's right arm and scalps him. In the final scene, Danton corners Hogan, shows him the scalp and commands him to remove his shirt and shoes. Releasing Hogan into the forest, Danton becomes the hunter.

== Cast ==
- Cameron Mitchell as Jaimy's father
- Troy Donahue as Don Michaelson
- Ted Prior as Michael "Mike" Danton
- Fritz Matthews as Captain Thorton
- David Campbell as Colonel John Hogan
- Dawn Abraham as Sybil
- William Zipp as Jack Cooper
- Suzzane Tara as Jaimy
- Thomas Baldwin as hillbilly
- Leonard Weltman as hillbilly

== Production ==
After The Winters Group helped finance David A. Prior's previous film Aerobicide, Prior formed Action International Pictures with executive producers David Winters and Bruce Lewin, and producer Peter Yuval. Their first projects were Mankillers and Deadly Prey. Both movies were shot back-to-back in and around Riverside, California.

Retired U.S. Army soldier Don Michelson acted as a technical advisor, with part of the film being shot at his American Military Museum outside South El Monte, California. Troy Donahue's character used his name in the film.

== Release ==
Deadly Prey was first screened at the American Film Market in November 1987. In the Philippines, the film was released by Solar Films as Born to Kill on February 4, 1988.

=== Home media ===
The film was officially released on DVD and Blu-ray in 2015.

== Reception ==
The film review aggregation website Rotten Tomatoes lists only one review, by the North Carolina alternative newspaper Mountain Xpress. Reviewer Ken Hanke describes it as "yet another of the seemingly endless barrage of cinematic knockoffs of Richard Connell's short story, 'The Most Dangerous Game' ... This particular low-rent effort is a mix of the story and First Blood (1982)." The review concludes that it is "all quite ridiculous, but might be good for a laugh if you're in the mood for ineptitude on an unbelievable scale."

== Sequel ==
A sequel entitled The Deadliest Prey was released on November 1, 2013.
