= Mankillers =

- Mankillers poster
- Directed by: David A. Prior
- Written by: David A. Prior
- Produced by: David Winters; Bruce Lewin; Peter Yuval
- Starring: Edd Byrnes; Gail Fisher; Edy Williams; Lynda Aldon; William Zipp; Christine Lunde; Suzanne Tegmann
- Cinematography: Keith Holland
- Edited by: Alan Carrier
- Music by: Tim Heintz; Tim James; Steve McClintock
- Distributed by: Action International Pictures; Sony Pictures Entertainment
- Release date: 1987
- Running time: 88 minutes
- Country: United States
- Language: English

Mankillers, also known as 12 Wild Women, is a 1987 action film written and directed by David A. Prior.

Filmed in 1986 in and around Riverside, California, United States, it was shot back to back with Deadly Prey as part of the newly formed Action International Pictures.

The alternate title notwithstanding, Mankillers actually features fifteen women as members of the titular commando unit, not twelve.

== Plot ==
A female CIA agent is assigned to train and lead an all-female combat squad to Colombia to stop a renegade agent who has hired himself out to a drug cartel and white slaver. Unfortunately, the agent's recruits consists of prison convicts - murderesses, sociopaths, bank robbers, etc. These women are guaranteed clean slates on their records if the mission is successfully pulled off. Their past "experience" from their criminal endeavors offers them some insight and skill, but most of their mission-specific training will require them to learn team effort, self-sacrifice, and the ability to follow orders and achieve mission objectives.

== Cast ==
- Edd Byrnes as Jack Marra
- Gail Fisher as Joan Hanson
- Edy Williams as Sgt. Roberts
- Lynda Aldon as Rachael McKenna
- William Zipp as John Mickland
- Christine Lunde as Maria Rosetti
- Suzanne Tegmann as Terry Davis
- Marilyn Stafford as Roxanne Taylor
- Paul Bruno as Bruno
- Bryan Clark as Williams
- Thyais Walsh as Vicki Thompson
- Bainbridge Scott as Christine Rollins
- Cyndi Domino as Trish Daniels
- Amber Star as K.C. Grimes
- John Taylor as Mannetti
- Sheila Best as Margaret Skinner
- Naomi Delgado as Vannesa Shaw
- Arlene Julian as Lisa Leonardo
- Veronica Carothers as Shannon Smith

== Release ==
Mankillers was released on DVD and Blu-ray on September 13, 2016.
