= Action International Pictures =

- Type: Independent
- Industry: Filmmaking, Distribution
- Founded: 1986
- Defunct: 1994
- Headquarters: Culver City, CA Trigueiros
- Area served: Worldwide
- Key people: David Winters, David A. Prior, Peter Yuval
- Products: Films, DVDs
- Services: Distribution
- Divisions: West Side Studios, Alpha Beta Films Intl.

Action International Pictures (AIP), also known as West Side Studios, is a film production and distribution company founded in 1986. AIP was founded by David Winters, David A. Prior and Peter Yuval. It also provided video distribution for many international films. Winters bought out his partners in 1992.

== Founding of the Studio ==
The year of its creation, 1986, was a turning point for David Winters. After being overruled on a casting decision for Thrashin', Winters made the professional decision to control all aspects of future projects. AIP was organized by Winters with partners; Prior and Yuval. That year, it set up a distribution arm, AIP Distribution, and a production studio branch, AIP Studios, and decided to introduce two features at the Cannes Film Festival, and Patricia J. Pawlak as vice president of international sales that were controlled by the studio.

Although Josh Brolin was ultimately cast in Thrashin', Winters' choice was a "pre-21 Jump Street", Johnny Depp. Winters had previously been a partner in the successful Winters-Rosen organization in the 1970s.

In 1987, Action International Pictures teamed up with Sony Video Software to handle distribution on the first four AIP film titles for home video distribution, which included Deadly Prey, Mankillers, Chase and Nightwars, via AIP Distribution, before setting up its own home video label, which was AIP Home Video.

== Output ==
According to the IMDb, AIP produced 17 films and distributed 41 films and videotapes between 1988 and 1994, and were involved in a total of 46 films in this period. Fifteen of these films were written and directed by Prior. Winters directed three of the films, including Space Mutiny, and produced 28 of them. Yuval wrote, directed, and produced two of the AIP films Dead End City (1988) and Firehead (1991) and directed two more.

Like many low-budget film productions, AIP's original films used many of the same cast and crew in many of the films, including David Prior's brother Ted as an actor and writer; the apparently versatile William Zipp as actor, writer, director, producer, and stunt man; and an occasional well-known actor such as Cameron Mitchell, who appeared in Space Mutiny and three other AIP ventures. When Mystery Science Theater 3000 screened Space Mutiny, they joked that the film was "infested" by the Mitchell family, as Cameron's two children also appeared in that film.

== West Side Studios ==
Winters bought out his partners in 1992, and re-branded AIP as West Side Studios. This was acknowledged as a nod to his 30-year association with West Side Story, as well as to de-emphasize action films. Prior would continue to direct for the company he sold.
