= David A. Prior =

American film director

- Photo of David A. Prior on a film set, taken between 2007 and 2015
- Born: October 24, 1955; Newark, New Jersey, U.S.
- Died: August 16, 2015 (aged 59); Mobile, Alabama, U.S.
- Occupations: Film director, screenwriter, producer
- Years active: 1983–2015
- Relatives: Ted Prior (brother)

David A. Prior (October 24, 1955 – August 16, 2015) was an American director, screenwriter, and producer. Prior started his career with the horror film Sledgehammer (1983), and the action film Killzone (1985). Shortly after, he co-founded Action International Pictures (AIP), his first directorial effort with this enterprise were Deadly Prey, Aerobicide, and Mankillers released in 1987. Subsequently, Prior made action films until the late 1990s.

Many of these films would star his bodybuilder brother Ted, and several of their collaborations became cult classics.

From 2000 to 2006, Prior went on a hiatus. From 2007 to his death in 2015, he continued directing films including Lost at War (2007), Zombie Wars (2008), Night Claws (2012), Deadliest Prey (2013), and Relentless Justice (2015).

== Career ==
=== 1983-1985: Early films ===
In 1983, Prior made his directorial debut with the horror film Sledgehammer. Katie Rife of The A.V. Club said the film "has the distinction of being the first shot-on-video slasher movie. That film established patterns that would persist throughout Prior’s career, namely, extremely low budgets, hammy dialogue, outrageous action, and, most importantly, the presence of his brother Ted".

In 1985, he directed the action film Killzone.

=== 1987-1999: Action and horror film director ===
Around this time Prior met with veteran producer and director David Winters, and with him he founded Action International Pictures also known as AIP. In 1987, Prior's directorial efforts that AIP released were the horror film Killer Workout, the action films Deadly Prey, and Mankillers. The made for VHS film gained a second audience two decades later as cult film that found its way on the internet.

In 1988, he directed Operation Warzone, an American Vietnam War film, Night Wars and Death Chase.

In 1989, he directed Rapid Fire, Future Force a science-fiction film starring David Carradine, and Hell on the Battleground.

In 1990, he is credited as the director of following films White Fury, Invasion Force, The Lost Platoon, Lock 'n' Load, Invasion Force, Future Zone,(Future Force's sequel) and The Final Sanction. That year, he was credited with the screenplays for Born Killer and Deadly Dancer.

In 1991, he produced Dark Rider and The Last Ride. That year, he wrote and directed Raw Nerve.

In 1992, he wrote and directed the film Center of the Web, starring Robert Davi, Tony Curtis, Charlene Tilton, and Charles Napier. He also produced Armed for Action and Blood on the Badge, both starring Joe Estevez.

In 1993, AIP was rebranded West Side Studios, to signal that the company would work with bigger budgets and become more mainstream. With the advancements of the company, Prior directed two films. One of them is Double Threat, with Sally Kirkland and Andrew Stevens. The other horror-thriller film Night Trap (which won a Gold Award at the WorldFest Houston for best Fantasy/Horror), starring Robert Davi.

In 1994, he directed the thriller Raw Justice (which won a Bronze Award at the WorldFest Charleston for best Theatrical Feature Film – Dramatic), starring Pamela Anderson, David Keith, and Robert Hays.

In 1995, he directed Felony and Mutant Species. Also that year he wrote Codename: Silencer.

In 1997, he produced The P.A.C.K..

In 1999, he directed Hostile Environment with Brigitte Nielsen, Matthias Hues, and Darren Shahlavi.

=== 2000 to 2015: Hiatus and final projects ===
From 2000 to 2006, Prior was on an hiatus.

In 2007, Prior returned to directing with Lost at War.

On March 15, 2009, Prior's Zombie Wars, a zombie apocalypse film, screened at the first Paranoia Horror Film Festival.

He also wrote the screenplay of The One Warrior released in 2011.

In 2012, he directed the bigfoot horror film Night Claws, starring Reb Brown.

In 2013, he wrote and directed Deadliest Prey, a sequel to Deadly Prey. On making a sequel, Ted said that he and David "decided to do a sequel based on fan mail, screenings, and all that stuff. I’ve talked to lot of fans of the movie, and after having all kinds of ideas thrown at us, Dave and I have decided to stick to the basic formula as the original. Fast pace and hard hitting."

In 2015, he was credited as writer for the screenplay of David Winters's Dancin': It's On!. Also he wrote and directed Relentless Justice starring Leilani Sarelle.

== Death ==
Prior died on August 16, 2015, at the age of 59. His death was described by his brother Ted as "a long battle of failing health".

== Filmography ==
Year	Title	Director	Writer	Producer	Notes
1983	Sledgehammer	Yes	Yes	No	First shot-on-video slasher movie
1985	Killzone	Yes	Yes	No	
1987	Mankillers	Yes	Yes	No	
1987	Killer Workout	Yes	Yes	Co-producer	Also editor
1987	Deadly Prey	Yes	Yes	No	
1988	Operation Warzone	Yes	Yes	No	
1988	Night Wars	Yes	Yes	No	
1988	Death Chase	Yes	Yes	No	
1989	Jungle Assault	Yes	Yes	Executive	Also cameo role as "Drug Runner"
1989	Rapid Fire	Yes	Yes	Yes	Also casting director
1989	Hell on the Battleground	Yes	Yes	No	
1989	Future Force	Yes	Yes	No	
1990	Lock 'n' Load	Yes	Yes	No	
1990	White Fury	Yes	Yes	No	
1990	Born Killer	No	Yes	Executive	Also second unit director
1990	Invasion Force	Yes	Yes	No	Also uncredited cameo as "Director in final shot"
1990	Future Zone	Yes	Yes	No	Also editor
1990	The Final Sanction	Yes	Yes	No	
1990	Deadly Dancer	No	Yes	No	
1991	That's Action	Yes	Yes	Executive	Documentary film Also editor
1991	The Lost Platoon	Yes	Yes	No	
1991	Raw Nerve	Yes	Yes	No	
1992	Center of the Web	Yes	Yes	No	
1993	Double Threat	Yes	Yes	No	
1993	Night Trap	Yes	Yes	No	
1994	Raw Justice	Yes	Yes	No	
1995	Mutant Species	Yes	Yes	Yes	
1995	Felony	Yes	Yes	No	
1995	Body Count	No	Yes	No	
1997	The P.A.C.K.	No	Yes	Executive	
1999	Hostile Environment	Yes	No	Yes	
2007	Lost at War	Yes	Yes	Yes	Also editor
2008	Zombie Wars	Yes	Yes	Yes	
2011	The One Warrior	No	Yes	Executive	
2012	Night Claws	Yes	Yes	Yes	Also editor
2013	Deadliest Prey	Yes	Yes	Yes	Also editor, casting director and cameo role as "Man in Van"
2015	Dancin': It's On!	No	Yes	No	Posthumously released
2015	Rentless Justice	Yes	Yes	Executive	Uncredited executive producer and also editor Posthumously released
TBA	Assassin's Fury	Yes	Yes	Yes	Incomplete; Also editor Shot in 2015. Production halted by Prior's death.

=== Executive producer only ===
- The Last Ride (1991)
- Presumed Guilty (1991) (Co-executive; Uncredited)
- Dark Rider (1991)
- Armed for Action (1992)
- Blood on the Badge (1992)

=== Assistant director ===
- Space Mutiny (1988) (Uncredited director: BellerIan Sequences)
- The Hostage (1998)

== Works cited ==
- Dendle, Peter (2012). The Zombie Movie Encyclopedia: Volume 2, 2000-2010. North Carolina: McFarland Publishing. ISBN 978-0-7864-6163-9.
- Budnik, Daniel R. (2017). '80s Action Movies on the Cheap. North Carolina: McFarland & Company Inc. ISBN 9780786497416
