= John Callas =

American film director

- Education: Occidental College
- Occupations: Writer, director, producer
- Years active: 1974 - present
- Website: www.johncallas.com

John Callas is an American film and television writer, director, and producer best known for Bobby's World, Lone Wolf, and No Solicitors.

== Early life and education ==
Callas received a Master's degree in directing from Occidental College in Los Angeles, CA.

== Career ==
Callas worked in a variety of film production positions beginning in 1977, including for the films Young Lady Chatterley and The Happy Hooker Goes To Hollywood. In 1983, he served as first assistant director and unit production manager on Wes Craven's The Hills Have Eyes Part II. In 1988, Callas made his directorial debut with the feature film Lone Wolf. In 1993, he was brought on to the design team for the Dennis the Menace trailer, to assemble a production team and handle live effects, for a nuanced visual effects sequence.

In 2015, he wrote, produced, and directed the horror film No Solicitors. The film starred Eric Roberts, Beverly Randolph, Kim Poirier, Jason Maxim, and Felissa Rose. It screened at multiple festivals in 2015, and was released on VOD and DVD in 2018.

Callas also authored the novels Secrets, Christmas Voices, and No Solicitors, based on the film of the same name.

== Filmography ==
=== Film ===
| Year | Title | Position | Notes |
|---|---|---|---|
| 1977 | Young Lady Chatterley | Dialogue Director | |
| 1979 | On the Air Live with Captain Midnight | Property Master | |
| 1980 | The Happy Hooker Goes Hollywood | First Assistant Director, Production Manager | |
| 1980 | Raging Bull | Assistant to Unit Production Manager | |
| 1981 | Totally Go-Go's | Production Manager | Video |
| 1984 | Styx: Caught in the Act | Production Manager | Video |
| 1984 | The Hills Have Eyes Part II | First Assistant Director, Unit Production Manager | |
| 1985 | The Compleat Al | Associate Producer | Video |
| 1988 | Lone Wolf | Director | |
| 1995 | The White Gorilla | Director | Short Film |
| 2015 | No Solicitors | Director, Producer, Writer | |

=== Television ===
| Year | Title | Position | Notes |
|---|---|---|---|
| 1982 | Potentials: Envisioning the New Millenium | Director | 3 episodes |
| 1983 | Contraption | Unit Production Manager | |
| 1990-98 | Bobby's World | Producer, Director, Producer (live-action sequence), Director (live-action sequence) | 80 episodes |

== Awards and nominations ==
| Year | Nominee / work | Award | Result |
|---|---|---|---|
| 1991 | Bobby's World | Daytime Emmy Award for Outstanding Animated Program | Nominated |
