= The Happy Hooker =

1972 book by Xaviera Hollander

- Author: Xaviera Hollander
- Genre: Memoir
- Publication date: 1972

The Happy Hooker is a best-selling memoir by Xaviera Hollander, a call girl, that appeared in 1972. It was first published by Dell in the United States and later the same year by Talmy in the United Kingdom. The strapline "My Own Story" appears on the cover of some editions.

The book sold over 20 million copies. Robin Moore, who took Hollander's dictation of the book's contents, came up with the title, while Yvonne Dunleavy ghostwrote it. In an interview published in 2019, Hollander said Dunleavy "was the one who wrote the book. They taped me, simply asking questions about my life and had the chapters spewed out in about three months. She wrote it, he edited it. He tried in vain to write a chapter, it was a piece of shit".

== Adaptations ==
Hollander's book inspired a series of movies, starting with The Happy Hooker (1975), which starred Lynn Redgrave. The film was followed by two sequels: The Happy Hooker Goes to Washington (1977) and The Happy Hooker Goes Hollywood (1980). In the sequels the role of Hollander was played by Joey Heatherton and Martine Beswick respectively.
