= No Solicitors =

- Directed by: John Callas
- Written by: John Callas
- Produced by: John Callas
- Starring: Eric Roberts; Beverly Randolph; Felissa Rose; Kim Poirier
- Cinematography: Howard Wexler
- Edited by: Josh Muscatine
- Music by: John Avarese
- Production company: Death by Solicitation
- Release date: 11 April 2015
- Running time: 99 minutes
- Country: United States
- Language: English

No Solicitors is a 2015 American horror film directed by John Callas, starring Eric Roberts, Beverly Randolph, Felissa Rose and Kim Poirier.

== Cast ==
- Eric Roberts as Lewis Cutterman
- Beverly Randolph as Rachel Cutterman
- Felissa Rose as Priscilla
- Kim Poirier as Nicole Cutterman
- Jason Maxim as Scott Cutterman
- Joshua Benton as Ralph Suarez
- Serein Wu as Julie Davenport
- Lucy Walsh as Mindy
- Del Howison as Doctor Esposito
- Vernon Wells as Sam Nortel
- Teddy Saunders as William
- Ken Sagoes as Marvin
- Susan Lanier as Nurse Helen
- Sunshine Manderbach Johnson as Nurse Mary Jane
- Justin Beahm as Doctor Bedard
- Blake Heron as Rapist
- Deron Miller as Jack
- Brian Fortuna as Jean
- Robin Ignico as Burglar

== Reception ==
Jessie Skeen of DVD Talk rated the film 3 stars out of 5, and wrote that it "works pretty well as a dark comedy, basically satirizing both the "perfect family" image and the "go-getter" attitudes of many people who work in sales."

Jamie Berardi of Rue Morgue called the film a "decent (at best) attempt at creating a “tongue-in-cheek” look into the lives of upper class suburbia in America."
