= The Life and Times of Xaviera Hollander =

1974 film

- 1980 theatrical release poster
- Directed by: Larry G. Spangler
- Screenplay by: Lawrence Pickwick; David Loin
- Story by: Susan Loyal
- Based on: The Happy Hooker (unauthorized) by Xaviera Hollander
- Produced by: Larry G. Spangler
- Starring: Samantha McLaren; John Holmes
- Narrated by: Xaviera Hollander
- Cinematography: Philip Kaplan
- Edited by: Bob McDaniels; Arthur May; Harvey Martin
- Music by: Adrian Beamer; Ken Sutherland
- Production company: Mature Pictures
- Distributed by: Mature Pictures Corporation
- Release date: September 4, 1974 (New York City)
- Running time: 76 minutes
- Country: United States
- Language: English
- Budget: $140,000
- Box office: $468,955

The Life and Times of Xaviera Hollander (also known as The Life and Times of the Happy Hooker, Inside Xaviera Hollander) is a 1974 American pornographic comedy film produced and directed by Larry G. Spangler. Based on the memoir The Happy Hooker by Xaviera Hollander, the film stars Samantha McLaren as Hollander, a Dutch immigrant who became a well-known call girl and eventual madam.

Independently produced, it was very successful financially, earning over three times its budget.

== Plot ==
The film follows the sexual exploits of a Dutch prostitute in her climb from schoolgirl to madam.

== Cast ==
- Xaviera Hollander (introduction only)
- Samantha McLaren
- Karen Stacy
- Franklin Anthony
- John Holmes
- Keith Erickson
- Rick Cassidy
- Rick Lutze (as Rick Lutz)
- Betty Hunt
- Paula Stone
- Sylvia Reasoner

== Music ==
- "Love is What I Am" - Becky Bauch and The Boondock Sisters
- "Mickey Mouse March" (background)

== Reception ==
The film's reception was poor.

== Lawsuit ==
In 1975, Larry G. Spangler was sued by Walt Disney Productions for the film's use of the "Mickey Mouse March". Judgement went against the producers, as the march was used excessively, negating their claim of parody and fair use. It was cited in Walt Disney Productions v. Air Pirates.
