= Alan Roberts (filmmaker) =

American film director

- Born: Robert Alan Brownell; November 2, 1946; United States
- Died: July 3, 2016 (aged 69); Los Angeles, California
- Occupation(s): Film director, screenwriter, film editor, film producer

Robert Alan Brownell (November 2, 1946 – July 3, 2016), known professionally as Alan Roberts, was an American filmmaker best known for directing low-budget films including Karate Cop and The Happy Hooker Goes Hollywood. Roberts began his career as a director. After 1994 most of his work was as an editor. Roberts' Young Lady Chatterly series is "a classical vehicle in the Emmanuelle mode."

In 1983, Roberts designed and produced the adult-themed Atari 2600 game X-Man. The game was controversial and sold poorly.

In 2011, Roberts was involved in production of the film Desert Warriors. The film was substantially altered by others, and released as the anti-Islamic film Innocence of Muslims in 2012.

== Selected filmography ==
=== As director ===
- Save Me (1994)
- Round Trip to Heaven (1992)
- Karate Cop (1991)
- Young Lady Chatterley II (1985)
- The Happy Hooker Goes Hollywood (1980)
- Young Lady Chatterley (1977)
- Panorama Blue (1974)
- The Sexpert (1972)
- The Zodiac Couples (1970)

=== As writer ===
- The Happy Hooker Goes Hollywood (story) (1980)
- The Zodiac Couples (1970)

=== As producer ===
- Street Poet (2010)
- Zombie Wars (2008)
- Lost at War (2007)
- Fighting Words (2007)
- Burning Man: The Burning Sensation (2002)
- Role of a Lifetime (2002)
- The Yellow Bird (short) (2001)
- Young Lady Chatterley II (1985)
- Racquet (1979)
- Young Lady Chatterley (1977)
- Panorama Blue (1974)
- Scream Bloody Murder (1973)
- The Sexpert (1972)
- The Zodiac Couples (1970)

=== As editor ===
- Zombie Wars (2008)
- Cielito lindo (2007)
- Fighting Words (2007)
- 30 Days (2006)
- Manhattan Minutiae (2006)
- Haunted Boat (2005)
- Dr. Rage (2005)
- Haunted House (2004)
- Secret Admirer (short) (2004)
- Career Suicide (short) (2004)
- One Man's Junk (short) (2004)
- Grand Theft Parsons (2003)
- Lost in the USA (2003)
- One of Us (short) (2002)
- Throttle (2002)
- White Boy (2002)
- 108 Stitches (2001)
- The Yellow Bird (short) (2001)
- Death Game (2001)
- Forbidden City (2001)
- Stanley's Gig (2000)
- Megalomania (short) (2000)
- The Last American Virgin (short) (2000)
- Dirt Merchant (uncredited) (1999)
- Deterrence (1999)
- 348 (1999)
- 4 Second Delay (short) (1998)
- One Plus Two Equals Four (1994)
