= Ron Marchini =

American karateka

- Born: March 4, 1945 (age 81); Stockton, California, U.S.
- Occupations: Actor, martial artist, author, school owner, producer

Ron Marchini (born March 4, 1945, in Stockton, California) is an American karateka, actor, author, school owner, and producer, who, according to many martial artists, is one of the many karate tournament fighters of all time.

== Martial arts ==
Marchini is a member of the Black Belt Hall of Fame. In 1967, Marchini won the Pacific Coast Tournament. In 1969, Marchini was the number one ranked karate fighter in the United States. Marchini won Henry Cho's Tournament of Champions in 1968. According to Chuck Norris, Marchini was among the toughest opponents he ever faced. Marchini was considered to be the best defensive fighter in karate from 1967 to 1970. In 1972, Marchini was ranked the number 3 karate fighter in the United States.

== Personal life ==
Marchini was a soldier and drill sergeant in the United States Army. Marchini worked as a martial arts tournament fighter, school owner, actor, and producer. Marchini is the survivor of a drive-by shooting.

== Media ==
Marchini is the author of several books, including Power Training in Kung-Fu and Karate, The Ultimate Art: Renbukai Volume 1, The Ultimate Art: Renbukai Volume 2, The Ultimate Art: Renbukai Volume 3, and The Ultimate Art: Renbukai Volume 4. Marchini starred in the 1990 movie Omega Cop and its 1991 sequel Karate Cop as well as the movie Death Machines.

== Filmography ==
- Karate Raider (1995)
- Karate Cop (1991)
- Omega Cop (1990)
- Arctic Warriors (1989)
- Return Fire (1988)
- Forgotten Warrior (1986)
- Jungle Wolf (1986)
- Ninja Warriors (1985)
- Dragon's Quest (1983)
- Death Machines (1976)
- Murder in the Orient (1974)
- New Gladiators (1973) (documentary)
