= Hollywood Backstage (1964 TV series) =

American television series

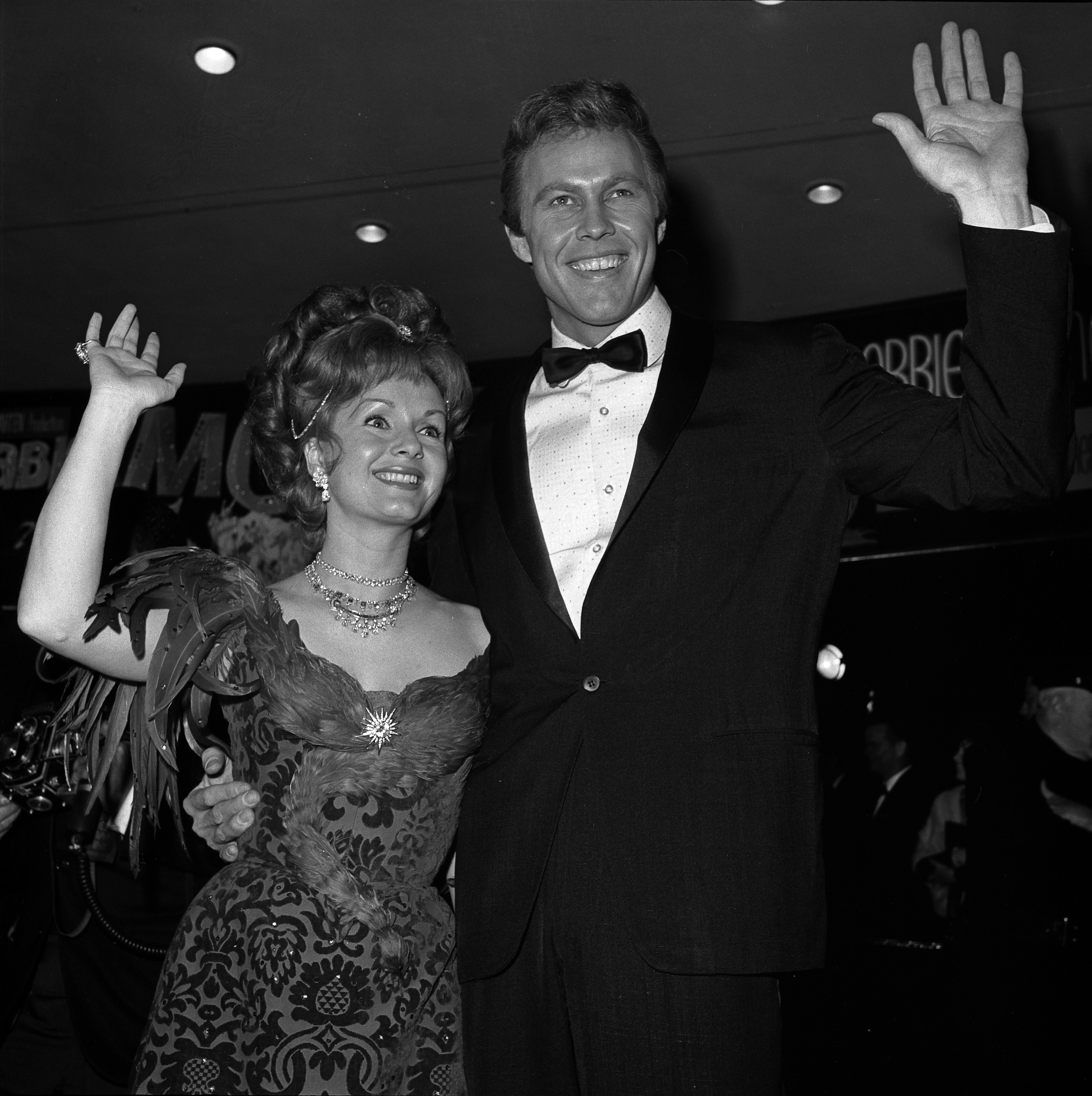
- Debbie Reynolds and Harve Presnell attending premiere of The Unsinkable Molly Brown, Egyptian Theatre (1964)
- Genre: Entertainment
- Written by: Paul Werth
- Directed by: Rick Spalla Sr.
- Presented by: John Willis; Army Archerd
- Country of origin: United States
- Original language: English

Production
- Producer: Rick Spalla Sr.
- Production locations: Los Angeles, California; London, England; Boulder, Colorado

Original release
- Release: 1964 – 1968

Hollywood Backstage is an American television series that features a behind-the-scenes look at the glamour of the Hollywood film industry. It originally ran from 1964 to 1968 and was originally titled Hollywood Star Newsreel. The programme had various presenters, including John Willis and Army Archerd.

== Format ==
John Willis narrates as cameras capture historic behind-the-scenes footage of film sets, charity functions, celebrity roasts, star interviews, and various Hollywood events. These include the premieres of It's a Mad, Mad, Mad, Mad World (1963), the first film to open at the Cinerama Dome; The Unsinkable Molly Brown (1964) at the Egyptian Theater; The Spy Who Came In from the Cold (1965); Viva Maria! (1965); Battle of the Bulge (1965); Zsa Zsa Gabor attending Doctor Zhivago (1965); The Blue Max (1966); and Fantastic Voyage (1966) at Grauman's Chinese Theatre.

Visits to film sets include Kiss Me, Stupid with Kim Novak (1964), Colorado location filming for Stagecoach (1966 film) starring Ann-Margret, Divorce American Style (1967) with Dick Van Dyke and Debbie Reynolds, Who's Minding the Mint? (1967), and The Fearless Vampire Killers (1967).

Miscellaneous segments include Edward G. Robinson at the dedication of his wax figure at the defunct Movieland Wax Museum in Buena Park, CA, the opening of Gazzarri's Hollywood a Go Go on the Sunset Strip, film/TV specialty auto customizing shop of George Barris, and a tour of now-gone historic back lot of Metro-Goldwyn-Mayer studio in Culver City, California.

Interviews include Sonny & Cher, Nancy Wilson, Janet Leigh, Red Buttons, Lorne Greene, Trini Lopez, Robert Wagner, Carolyn Jones, and Mamie Van Doren riding a motorcycle with Dave Ekins.
