= Harlee McBride =

American actress (born 1948)

- Born: November 20, 1948 (age 77); Los Angeles, California, U.S.
- Occupation: Actress
- Years active: 1976–1999
- Spouses: Garth Benton; Richard Belzer (m. 1985; died 2023)
- Children: 2

Harlee McBride (born November 20, 1948) is an American retired actress. She is best known for the role of Cynthia Chatterley in Young Lady Chatterley and Young Lady Chatterley II, and as Dr. Alyssa Dyer on Homicide: Life on the Street.

== Personal life ==
She married actor Richard Belzer in 1985. They met in Los Angeles in 1981, when she was 33 and divorced (from actor Garth Benton), with two daughters, Bree and Jessica. McBride, who had been seen in Playboy magazine four years earlier as part of that year's sex-in-cinema feature, in conjunction with Young Lady Chatterley, was appearing in TV commercials for the auto maker Ford and acting in free theater, when she met Belzer at the suggestion of a friend. During the 1980s, she worked as a secretary at Disneyland.

On October 12, 2014, McBride was disruptive on an Air France flight from New York to Paris. She was yelling and threw a tray of food. She was handcuffed to her seat by cabin crew. The pilots made an emergency landing in Gander, Newfoundland and Labrador, where she spent two nights in a local jail cell until her CAD$10,000 bail was posted. In May 2016, a Gander judge ordered McBride to pay $26,433 in restitution and $10,000.

== Filmography ==
=== Film ===
Year	Title	Role	Notes
1977	Young Lady Chatterley	Cynthia Chatterley	
1978	House Calls	Nurse	
1985	Young Lady Chatterley II	Cynthia Chatterley	

=== Television ===
Year	Title	Role	Notes
1976	Switch	Sharon	Episode: "Pirates of Tin Pan Alley"
1976	Most Wanted	Lila	Episode: "The Two Dollar Kidnappers"
1976	Raid on Entebbe	Air France Stewardess	Television film
1978	Three on a Date	Model #1	Television film
1978	Danny and the Mermaid	Aqua	Television film
1978	The Rockford Files	Monica	Episode: "Local Man Eaten by Newspaper"
1979	Institute for Revenge	I. F. R. Female Member	Television film
1983	Likely Stories Vol. 3	Honey	Television film
1987	Richard Belzer: Another Lone Nut	Marilyn Monroe	Television film
1994 – 1999	Homicide: Life on the Street	Dr. Alyssa Dyer	22 Episodes
