= Lawrence Montaigne =

American actor

- Lawrence Montaigne in Perry Mason 1965
- Born: February 26, 1931; Brooklyn, New York, U.S.
- Died: March 17, 2017 (aged 86); Henderson, Nevada, U.S.
- Occupation: Actor
- Years active: 1953–2007
- Spouse: Patricia Montaigne

Lawrence Montaigne (February 26, 1931 – March 17, 2017) was an American actor, writer, dancer, and stuntman. As an actor, he was known for his appearances on many 1960s television shows.

== Life and career ==
Born in New York, but later raised in Rome, Italy, Montaigne spoke several languages—a skill he used to his advantage in securing roles in international productions. He served in the U.S. Marine Corps and was only one platoon apart in the Parris Island boot camp from his future friend and co-star Steve McQueen.

He appeared in the role of Dr. Chauncy Hartlund in the 1965 Perry Mason episode, "The Case of the Carefree Coronary". In 1966, Montaigne portrayed the Romulan Decius in the Star Trek episode "Balance of Terror". In 1967, he portrayed Soldado, the rogue Apache chief, in an episode of Hondo. He had also been considered for the role of Mr. Spock, as Leonard Nimoy was being considered for a role on Mission Impossible. A year later, he portrayed the Vulcan Stonn, the paramour of Spock's intended bride T'Pring, in the episode "Amok Time"—a role that he reprised in 2006 in the unofficial mini-series Star Trek: Of Gods and Men.

Additionally, he guest-starred on episodes of Batman, Voyage to the Bottom of the Sea, The Man From U.N.C.L.E., Blue Light, Mission: Impossible, The Time Tunnel, The Invaders, Perry Mason, McCloud, Hogan's Heroes, Bonanza and The Feather and Father Gang.

His motion picture appearances include roles in The Great Escape (1963), Captain Sindbad (1963), Tobruk (1967), The Power (1968), The Psycho Lover (1970), Escape to Witch Mountain (1975), Framed (1975), Young Lady Chatterley (1977), Deadly Blessing (1981) and Dakota (1988). During the 1980s, Montaigne taught film at North Texas State University.

He wrote the film The Million Dollar Dixie Deliverance.

For some years, Montaigne lived in Las Vegas, Nevada, and translated medical texts for a publishing firm. In 2007, Montaigne voiced a guest-starring role in the pilot episode of the web series Star Trek: The Continuing Mission.

Montaigne died on March 17, 2017, aged 86.

== Filmography ==
Year	Title	Role	Notes
1953	The Beast from 20,000 Fathoms	Soldier	Uncredited
1953	The Band Wagon	Minor Role	Uncredited
1959	Amud Ha'Esh	David	
1960	Rapina al quartiere Ovest		
1960	Mobby Jackson		
1961	The Mongols	Prince Stefan's Ally	
1961	The Italian Brigands	O Prevete	
1962	Damon and Pythias	Flute Player	
1963	Captain Sindbad	Jafar	
1963	The Great Escape	Haynes, "Diversions"	
1964	Combat!	Sergeant Koch	Episode: A Rare Vintage
1965	The Satan Bug	Officer At Radar Tracking Station	Uncredited
1965	Perry Mason	Dr. Chauncy Hartlund	Episode: "The Case of the Carefree Coronary"
1965	Synanon	The Greek	
1965	Hogan's Heroes	Sgt Steinfeld	Episode: S01E09 "Go Light on the Heavy Water"
1966	Star Trek: The Original Series	Decius	S1:E14, "Balance of Terror"
1967	Star Trek: The Original Series	Stonn	S2:E1, "Amok Time"
1967	Tobruk	Italian Officer	
1968	The Power	Briggs	
1969	Topaz	Russian Agent #2	Uncredited
1970	The Psycho Lover	Kenneth Alden	aka Psycho Killer
1971	Bearcats!	Koster	1 episode
1971	Mission: Impossible	Steve Johnson	1 episode
1972	Bonanza	Sid Langley	Episode: "Search in Limbo"
1975	Escape to Witch Mountain	Ubermann	
1975	Framed	Deputy Allison	
1977	Young Lady Chatterley	Carl, The Chauffeur	
1980	Everything Happens to Me	Military Sergeant	
1981	Deadly Blessing	Matthew Gluntz	
1988	Dakota	Mr. Diamond	
2007	Star Trek: Of Gods and Men	Stonn	Fan-Made Web Film
2012	Get a Life!	Himself	A Documentary About Star Trek Fandom
2018	The Coolest Guy Movie Ever: Return to the Scene of The Great Escape	The Narrator	Posthumous Release
