= Rodger Boyce =

American film actor

Rodger Boyce is an American character actor who has appeared in more than a dozen feature films, including Best Picture Oscar winner No Country for Old Men one of three films he has done with Tommy Lee Jones (the others including The Three Burials of Melquiades Estrada and The Good Old Boys). Other notable feature film appearances include Where the Heart Is, A Perfect World and Lone Star State of Mind. He has also appeared in some 25 made-for-television movies. In addition, his television work has included episodic appearances in TV series ranging from Dallas, Dangerous Curves and The Big Easy to Walker, Texas Ranger, Roughriders, The Good Guys and even Wishbone. Rodger began his acting career in theater, and he has occasionally returned to the stage, appearing in summer stock and regional theater productions. A graduate of Texas Tech University where he majored in journalism and English, Rodger is a native Texan and former newspaper reporter and editor, and for a number of years was a community college teacher and administrator. He and his wife Juddi, a professional counselor/therapist, live in Gainesville, Texas.

== Filmography ==
Year	Title	Role	Notes
1985	Papa Was a Preacher	Mr. Granger	
1988	Dakota	Sheriff	
1991	Necessary Roughness	Sheriff Woods	
1992	Ruby	Police Chief	
1993	Fatal Deception: Mrs. Lee Harvey Oswald	2nd Agent	Television film
1993	A Perfect World	Mr. Willits	
1994	Bad Girls	Agua Dulce Bank Manager	
1995	The Stars Fell on Henrietta	P.G. Pratt (oilman)	
1997	Night Vision	Chief Williams	
2000	Where the Heart Is	Officer Harry	
2002	Lone Star State of Mind	Sheriff Andy	
2005	The Three Burials of Melquiades Estrada	Salesman	
2007	No Country for Old Men	El Paso Sheriff	
2013	The Bystander Theory	Sheriff Blair Sneed	
2015	Windsor	Parole Board Chairman	
