= Richard M. Davidson (actor) =

American actor

- Born: May 10, 1940 (age 84); Hamilton, Ontario, Canada
- Occupation: Actor
- Years active: 1961–present

Richard M. Davidson (born 10 May 1940) is a Canadian-American actor and audiobook narrator.

== Life and career ==
Davidson was born in Hamilton, Ontario and graduated from University of Toronto. He studied drama at Hart House Theatre in Toronto and made his professional acting stage debut under the name Michael Davidson in the production Coriolanus at Stratford Shakespeare Festival in Stratford in 1961. Subsequently, he left Canada and trained at the London Academy of Music and Dramatic Art. After graduation, he acted in various stage productions, including tour in Holland in "A Midsummer Night's Dream". He returned to Canada in 1966.

He has had a long-standing career in acting, appearing on radio, television and stage. Richard Davidson has narrated over 200 books.

== Filmography ==
=== Film ===
Year	Title	Role	Notes
1975	My Pleasure Is My Business	Reporter	
1976	Breaking Point	Hirsch	
1978	I Miss You, Hugs and Kisses	Barrington	
1983	Variety	Louie	
1985	Insignificance	Director of Photography	
1986	Working Girls	Jerry	
1997	Broadway Damage	The John	
1999	The Hurricane	Paterson Detective	
2000	Deeply	Young Peat / Voice of Malcolm	
2004	Knots	Emily's father	
2006	The Favor	Principal Foreman	
2012	Nothing Without You	Psych Hospital Therapist	
2016	Cap'n Flapjack: The Curse of the Sticky Anchor	The COO	Short

=== Television ===
Year	Title	Role	Notes
1968	Festival	Wolfie	Episode: "Noises of Paradise"
1970	Sunday At Nine		Episode: "A Small Remedy"
1973	Program X		Episode: "Nightmare"
1973	Dr. Simon Locke	Gelson	Episode: "Vengeance"
1973	The Collaborators	Drew	Episode: "Luck...Without It, You're Nowhere"
1974	Anthology		Episode: "Find Valopchi"
1975	On the Evidence		Episode: "Manslaughter"
1977	Fit to Print		Television film
1977	The New Avengers	Phillips	Episode: "Emily"
1988	Diamonds		Episode: "Sweetheart Deal"
1989–1992	Katts and Dog		3 episodes
1992	Split Images	Man	Television film
1992–1993	Material World	Moe Weinstock	2 episodes
2000	The Last Debate	Ken Dixon	Television film
2001	Law & Order: Special Victims Unit	Sterner	Episode: "Pixies"
2001	Life with Judy Garland: Me and My Shadows	Jack Warner	Television film
2001	Final Jeopardy	Judge Hadleigh	Television film
2004	Hustle		Television film
1990–2004	Law & Order		4 episodes
