= Malcolm Bennett =

British poet and author

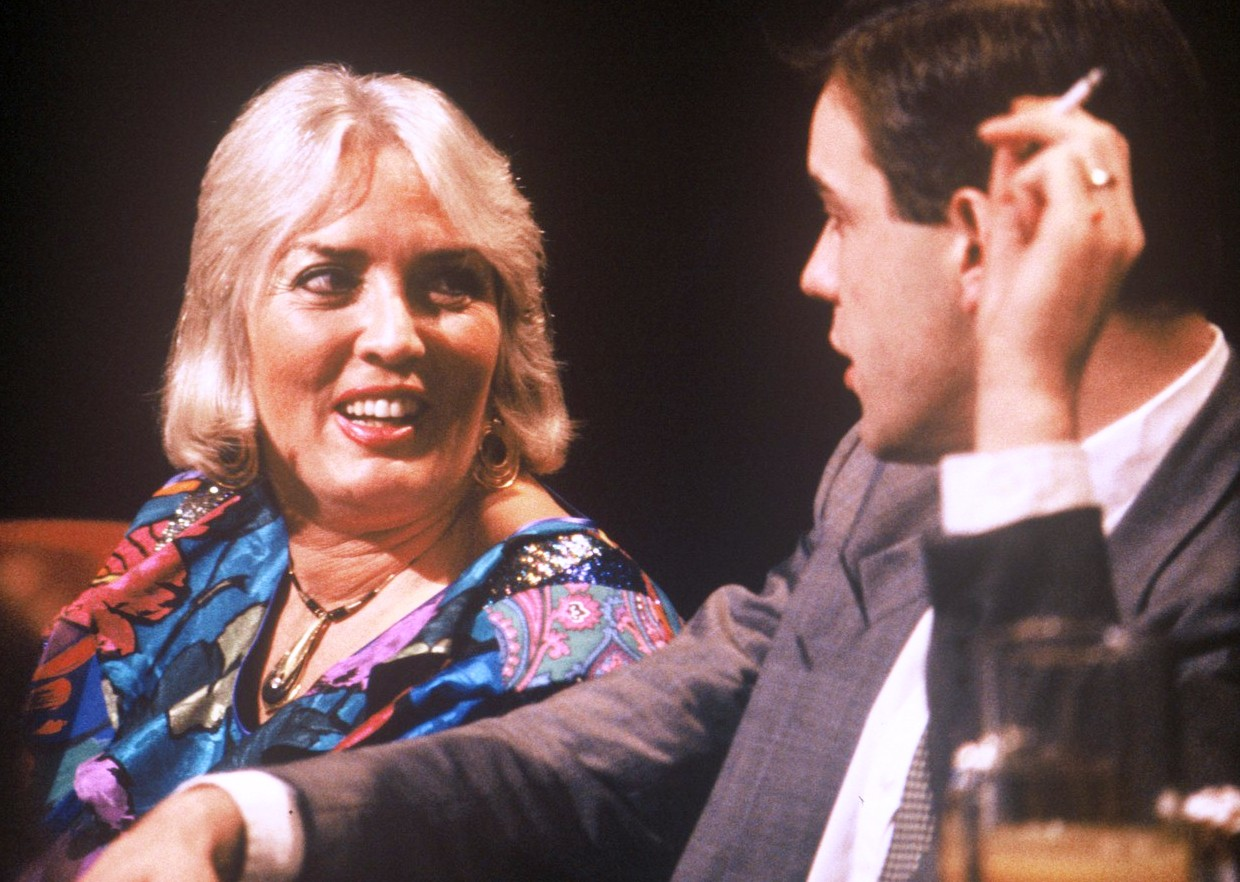
Appearing with Xaviera Hollander on TV programme After Dark in 1989

Malcolm Alan Bennett (21 September 1958 – 1 March 2015) was a British poet and author. He was the co-creator of the noir-inspired pulp magazine BRUTE! with Aidan Hughes.
