= Young Lady Chatterley II =

- DVD cover
- Directed by: Alan Roberts
- Screenplay by: Anthony Williams
- Based on: Lady Chatterley's Lover by D. H. Lawrence
- Starring: Harlee McBride; Sybil Danning; Adam West
- Production company: Park Lane Productions
- Release date: 1985
- Country: United States
- Language: English

Young Lady Chatterley II is a 1985 American softcore pornographic film directed Alan Roberts and starring Harlee McBride, Sybil Danning, and Adam West. It is the sequel to the 1977 film Young Lady Chatterley.

== Premise ==
Cynthia, the new Lady Chatterley, is feeling neglected by her husband and while he is away tries to amuse herself with Thomas the gardener, but is always interrupted by visitors.

== Cast ==
- Harlee McBride as Cynthia Chatterley
- Sybil Danning as Judith Grimmer
- Adam West as Arthur Bohart Jr.
- Mike Reynolds as Howard Beechum III
- Wendy Barry as Sybil, The Maid
- Monique Gabrielle as Eunice, The Maid
- Brandy Lyne as Wanda, The Maid
