= My Pleasure Is My Business =

1975 Canadian comedy film

- Directed by: Al Waxman
- Written by: Alvin Boretz
- Produced by: Jesse Vogel
- Starring: Xaviera Hollander; Henry Ramer
- Cinematography: Harry Makin
- Edited by: Stan Cole
- Music by: Tom Cochrane
- Production companies: August Films; Merra Films; Rontigo
- Distributed by: Brian Distributing Corporation; Miracle Films
- Release date: January 17, 1975
- Running time: 94 minutes
- Country: Canada
- Language: English

My Pleasure Is My Business is a Canadian sex comedy film, written and directed by Al Waxman and released in 1975. A fictionalized parody of Xaviera Hollander's public image as "The Happy Hooker", the film stars Hollander as Gabriella, a pornographic actress who is exiled from the United States after being embroiled in a sex scandal with a United States Senator, but struggles to find a new place to live until she is admitted to the European nation of "Gestalt", where she successfully converts the entire country to a philosophy of free love.

The cast includes Henry Ramer as the President of Gestalt, as well as Colin Fox, Jackie Burroughs, Don Cullen, Kenneth Lynch, George Sperdakos, Marvin Goldhar, Michael Kirby, Jayne Eastwood, Renata Plestina, Monica Parker, Nick Nichols, Sydney Brown, Richard M. Davidson, Robert Goodier, Dinah Christie, Allen Doremus, William Nunn, Guy Sanvido, Ardon Bess, Peter McConnell and Alan Migicovsky in supporting roles.

== Production ==
Hollander was quick to clarify in the film's early promotion that although she did have a nude scene in it, the film was a sex spoof rather than a pornographic film.

The film's soundtrack was composed by singer-songwriter Tom Cochrane.

== Release ==
The film opened in Canadian theatres on January 17, 1975.

== Reception ==
The film was panned by critics. On the review aggregator website Rotten Tomatoes, 10% of 10 critics' reviews are positive.
