= The Happy Hooker (film) =

1975 film

- Theatrical release poster
- Directed by: Nicholas Sgarro
- Screenplay by: William Richert
- Based on: The Happy Hooker by Xaviera Hollander with Yvonne Dunleavy and Robin Moore
- Produced by: Fred C. Caruso; Dennis Friedland; Marlene Hess
- Starring: Lynn Redgrave; Jean-Pierre Aumont; Conrad Janis
- Cinematography: Richard C. Kratina
- Edited by: Gerald B. Greenberg; Cynthia Scheider
- Music by: Don Elliott
- Distributed by: Cannon Films
- Release date: May 8, 1975
- Running time: 96 minutes
- Country: United States
- Language: English

The Happy Hooker is a 1975 American biographical-comedy film directed by Nicholas Sgarro and starring Lynn Redgrave. It was adapted from the best-selling memoir by Xaviera Hollander.

== Plot ==
As prostitutes are arrested in New York, a flashback begins to the life of one of them, a Dutch secretary Xaviera Hollander who moved to New York in hopes of marrying her fiancé Carl, whom she met while visiting her sister in South Africa.

Observing how Carl does not help her take her bags off the airplane and his increasingly long morning routine and primping, Xaviera grows concerned he is not the man she thought he was. Her suspicions are confirmed when his mother insults her over dinner. Xaviera offers him a choice of her or his mother, and he picks his mother.

Xaviera finds work at the Dutch Embassy as a translator and secretary. She is asked on a date by Frenchman Yves, and she quickly falls in love with him and his extravagant lifestyle as Yves has made a small fortune as a consultant for large corporations and small countries.

Yves announces that he must leave as he has been summoned by the king of a Middle Eastern country. Xaviera breaks down crying. He hands her a large envelope containing cash. Although it makes her feel like a prostitute, she realizes that this may be her calling in life because she loves sex and money. She starts meeting up with Yves' friends.

Xaviera prospers as a prostitute until a corrupt police officer takes her money and tries to rape her. She goes to work at a local bordello with a madam who offers her a 50/50 split. Xaviera decides that she can do better on her own, so she leaves to open her own bordello 10 blocks away. After a while, she is the most successful madam in New York City and buys out her former madam's business.

All is well until the corrupt cop sees her and instigates a raid, sending her to jail. Xaviera's attorney bails her out of jail and sets her up with a friend of his who is coming in from Montreal.

== Principal cast ==
Actor	Role
Lynn Redgrave	Xaviera Hollander
Jean-Pierre Aumont	Yves St. Jacques
Tom Poston	J. Arthur Conrad
Lovelady Powell	Madelaine
Nicholas Pryor	Carl Gordon
Elizabeth Wilson	Mrs. Gordon
Conrad Janis	Fred
Richard Lynch	The Cop
Vincent Schiavelli	M.G.
Anita Morris	May Smith
Kenneth Tigar	Steve

== Critical reception ==
Vincent Canby of The New York Times enjoyed the film:

The movie is a cheerily amoral New York comedy about greed and lust in the land of opportunity... Having been derived from such unlikely subject matter, The Happy Hooker is doubley [sic] surprising. It's a witty work.

On the other hand, Roger Ebert of the Chicago Sun-Times gave it one star out of four and wrote:

If Horatio Alger were alive today, he would no doubt be appalled by The Happy Hooker, the story of a girl who gets started off on the right foot in life but, through pluck and endurance, makes bad...What all of this is supposed to prove is beyond me.

== See also ==
- List of American films of 1975
- The Happy Hooker Goes to Washington (1977)
- The Happy Hooker Goes Hollywood (1980)
