= Selma Archerd =

American actress (1925–2023)

- Born: Selma Helene Fenning; February 26, 1925; Newark, New Jersey, U.S.
- Died: December 14, 2023 (aged 98); Los Angeles, California, U.S.
- Years active: 1973–2000
- Spouses: Howard M. Rosenblum (m. 1943; div. 1968); Army Archerd (m. 1969; died 2009)
- Children: 2

Selma Helene Archerd (née Fenning; February 26, 1925 – December 14, 2023) was an American actress, known for her roles in Die Hard (1988), Lethal Weapon (1987) and Lethal Weapon 3 (1992). She mostly played background roles (saleslady, woman, customer, hostage, passenger) throughout her 27-year career in television and film.

== Early life and career ==
Selma Helene Fenning was born on February 26, 1925, in Newark, New Jersey, one of two children born to Charlotte Hurdus and A. Harry Fenning, a New York-based furrier who relocated with his family to Los Angeles in approximately 1935. Selma attended UCLA and was a member of Alpha Epsilon Phi. Besides her many films, listed below, she played roles on television, including 25 episodes of Melrose Place as Nurse Amy. Other television roles included The Brady Bunch, Kolchak: The Night Stalker, The Love Boat, Hotel, Knots Landing, Marcus Welby, M.D., Roseanne, and Cagney & Lacey. She sometimes appeared with her husband on the game show Tattletales.

== Personal life and death ==
Her first marriage, to Howard M. Rosenblum, lasted from June 27, 1943, until their divorce in October 1968. They had two sons. The following year, on November 15, she wed entertainment columnist Army Archerd, to whom she remained married until his death on September 8, 2009. Selma Archerd died in Los Angeles on December 14, 2023, at the age of 98.

== Filmography ==
Airport 1975 (1974) - Frightened Woman

The Big Bus (1976)

Gable and Lombard (1976) - Mrs. Ivan Cooper

Harry and Walter Go to New York (1976) - Woman patron

Mother, Jugs & Speed (1976) - unspecified "important role"

W. C. Fields and Me (1976) - Salesperson

Fire Sale (1977) - Ellie

Fun With Dick and Jane (1977) - Beverly Hills matron

New York, New York (1977) - Wife of Justice of the Peace

Americathon (1979) - Telethon phone celebrity

The Concorde... Airport '79 (1979) - Passenger

Meteor (1979) - Woman in subway

Can't Stop the Music (1980) - Mrs. Williams

Mommie Dearest (1981) - Connie

Hard to Hold (1984) - Mrs. Adilman

Fever Pitch (1985) - Sister Theresa

Lethal Weapon (1987) - Policewoman

Die Hard (1988) - Hostage #1

Scrooged (1988) - Mrs. Claus at party

Side Out (1990) - Sand and Sea receptionist

Taking Care of Business (1990) - Woman in pro shop

Lethal Weapon 3 (1992) - Officer Selma

Indecent Proposal (1993)

Born Yesterday (1993) - Lois
