= Lucy Walsh =

American singer (born 1982)

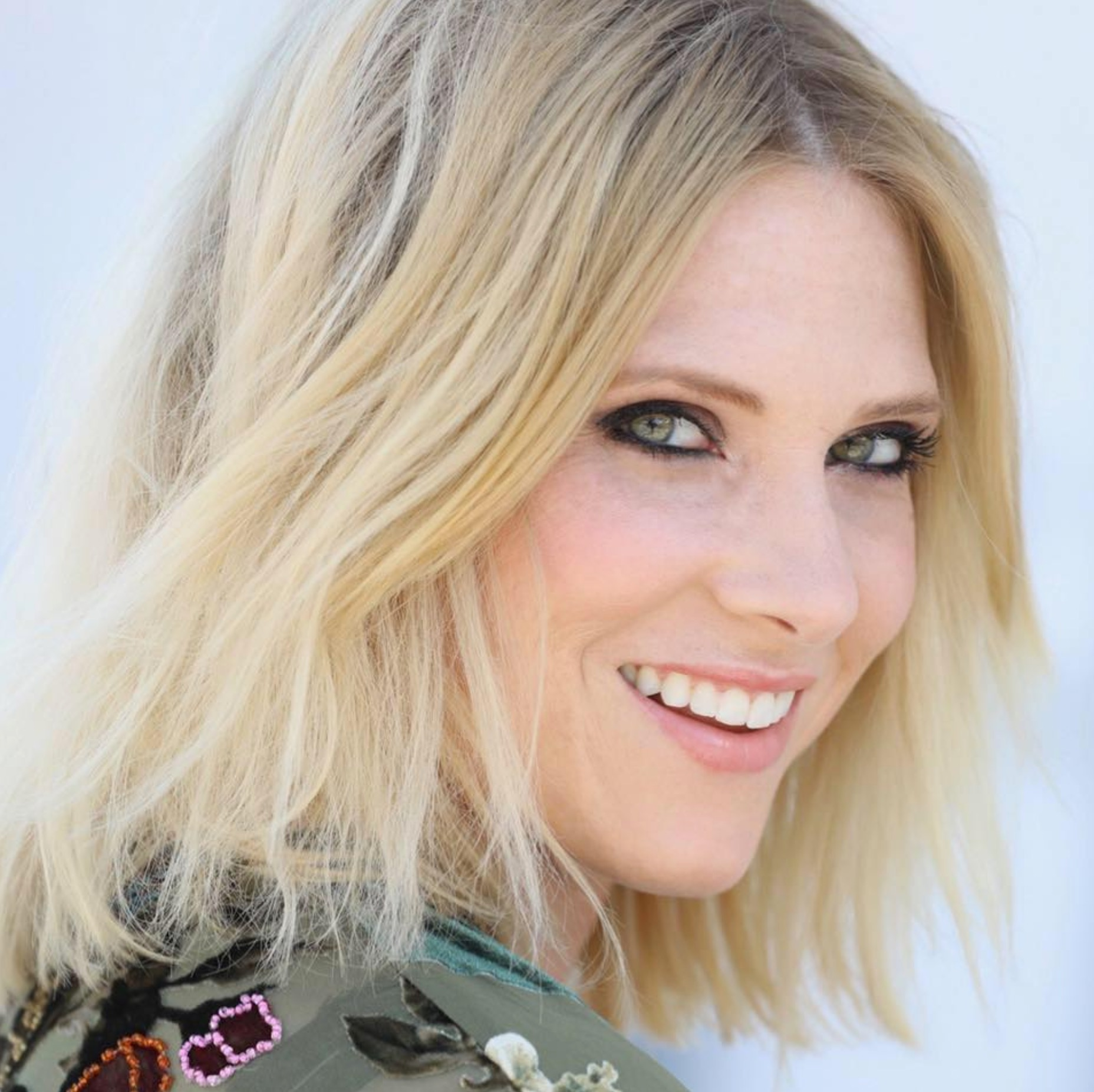
- Walsh, 2020
- Born: Lucy Marie Walsh; December 3, 1982 (age 43); Santa Barbara, California, U.S.
- Occupations: Actress; singer; songwriter; pianist
- Spouse: Will Sweeny (m. 2021)

Lucy Marie Walsh (born December 3, 1982) is an American actress, singer, songwriter, and pianist. She is also known for her television and film roles. She is the daughter of Eagles' guitarist Joe Walsh and his third wife, Juanita "Jody" Boyer.

== Personal life ==
Walsh has been married to Will Sweeny since May 2021. He is the son of ghost hunter Yvette Fielding, who is the cousin of renowned ghost hunter and Most Haunted cameraman Stuart Torevell.

== Musical career ==
Lucy is also a classically trained pianist and a professional singer and songwriter. She grew up in a musical family, her father is Joe Walsh of the band Eagles (she was named “Favorite Rockstar Daughter” by CBS News, her uncle (by marriage) is Ringo Starr of The Beatles, and her grandmother was a pianist for the New York City Ballet. When Lucy's dad was awarded the Kennedy Center Honor by President Barack Obama and First Lady Michelle Obama, she attended the White House by his side. Signed to Island Def Jam by Jay-Z and L.A. Reid, Lucy has toured internationally with her music, most recently with Maroon 5, OneRepublic and Bruno Mars.

She has performed on National Television with MTV's hit series Rock the Cradle, earning the highest judge's score of the season. Judge Larry Rudolph said that "the hairs on his arms were standing up after hearing her. She received a "Perfect 10 from Rudolph for her performance of Don Henley's "The Heart of the Matter". Fellow judge Brian Friedman said, "Lucy was untouchable... magical, I was in her soul."

Lucy has sung the "National Anthem" at numerous events, including Dodger Stadium, UCLA’S Angel City Games hosted by Mayor Eric Garcetti, and for President Bill Clinton, Maria Shriver, and Tiger Woods. Lucy has been featured on numerous artists albums, including Secondhand Serenade and Roy Orbison’s Under The Sheets tribute record. Her music has been recorded by multiple recording artists, in several languages, and her original songs have over 1 million plays online.

== Podcast ==
Lucy has a bi-weekly podcast with her friend Annabel Jones (daughter of Monkee Davy Jones) called The Lucy and Annabel Show. They discuss their childhoods and current happenings in their life. The podcast airs every other weekend. It can be found on YouTube, itunes and Spotify.

Author Lucy has written a book titled Remember me as Human 2024.

== Acting career ==
Her debut Shakespearean performance as Ariel in The Tempest won her a Broadway World nomination for Best Actress.

She has gone on to play Shakespeare’s most famous heroines, including;

- Cleopatra in Antony and Cleopatra
- Beatrice in Much Ado About Nothing, which won Best Director (Gloria Gifford) at the NAACP Theatre Awards 2018
- Adriana in The Comedy of Errors, for which she won Best Ensemble in the Valley Theatre Awards with her cast.

Lucy's additional theatre credits include:

- Joyce Carol Oates drama I Stand Before You Naked
- Oscar-nominated comedy icons Renée Taylor and Joe Bologna's comedy Love Allways
- Stephen Adly Guirguis’s The Motherfu**er With The Hat
- Down On Your Knees and Up To The Moon, an a cappella musical she co-wrote with the show's New York director Gloria Gifford.

Known for her role on the 9th season of Curb Your Enthusiasm opposite Elizabeth Banks and Larry David, Walsh has also recently appeared on Criminal Minds playing the head cop and directed by the show's Tony-winning star Joe Mantegna. Lucy has also guest starred on NCIS, and her feature films include the horror hit No Solicitors opposite Eric Roberts, and Garry Marshall’s final film Mother's Day opposite Jason Sudeikis. Lucy also has her original song "Winter Coat" included in the film, during Julia Roberts iconic throwback to Pretty Woman scene.

== Discography ==
=== Singles ===
Year	Title	Album
2007	"So Uncool"	Lost in the Lights

=== Albums ===
- Lucy Walsh [unreleased – 2005]
- Lost in the Lights [unreleased – 2008]
- 1882 [released to iTunes – 2011]

== Filmography ==
Film roles
Year	Title	Role	Notes
2006	Living the Dream	Girl #3	
2010	Iron Man 2	Scientist in explosion	Uncredited
2011	No Strings Attached	Bethany	Uncredited
2011	Breathe	Auralee	Short film
2012	Here Comes Midnight	Sunshine	Short film
2013	Gangster Squad	Manicurist	Uncredited
2013	The Truth About Emanuel	Mother	
2015	No Solicitors	Mindy	
2016	Mother's Day	Jody	
2016	I Am Borderline	Lucy	Short film
2017	The Two Dogs	Gloria Glory	

Television roles
Year	Title	Role	Notes
2008	Rock the Cradle	Herself	6 episodes
2015	NCIS	Alice - Café Waitress	Episode: "Check"
2016	Criminal Minds	Sgt. Natalie Whitfield	Episode: "The Sandman"
2016	Roadside Stars	Ginny	Television film
2017	Curb Your Enthusiasm	Elizabeth's Friend Lucy	Episode: "A Disturbance in the Kitchen"

== Theatre ==
- The Tempest (2014 – as Ariel)
- The Comedy of Errors (2015 – as Adriana)
- Much Ado About Nothing (2016 – as Beatrice)
- Antony and Cleopatra (2017 – as Cleopatra)
