= Omega Cop =

- Directed by: Paul Kyriazi
- Written by: Novel: Denny Grayson; Joe Meyer; Paul Kyriazi; Screenplay: Salli McQuaid
- Produced by: Ron Marchini; Garrick Huey
- Starring: Adam West; Ron Marchini; Stuart Whitman; Troy Donahue
- Edited by: Garrick Huey
- Music by: Ralph Stover; Cecil Ramirez
- Distributed by: South Gate Entertainment
- Release date: 1989
- Running time: 87 minutes
- Country: United States
- Language: English
- Budget: $180,000

Omega Cop is a 1989 film starring Adam West, Ron Marchini, Stuart Whitman, and Troy Donahue. It was also released under the title John Travis: Solar Survivor. The film was written and produced by Ronald L. Marchini, and executive-produced by his wife, Jo Anne Marchini. Omega Cop was followed by a sequel, Karate Cop.

== Plot ==
In the year 1999, the world is in the midst of an environmental holocaust, the result of a series of solar flares which have scorched the Earth for the last 30 years. Exposure to the flares results in a radiation poisoning which causes the affected to degenerate into psychotic killers. The vast majority of the world's population is dead, the world is desolate and arid, and in the United States the government and military now only control New York City and Washington DC. Otherwise, what is left of humanity is divided between militarised encampments protecting pockets of the unaffected survivors, and roving groups of slavers and scavengers. Unradiated water, gasoline and women have become precious resources which the surviving groups hoard jealously and are willing to kill to obtain.

John Travis (Ron Marchini) is the leader of a security patrol for one of the compounds led by Prescott (Adam West) when he and his squad are sent to investigate reports of a slaver auction of female captives. Suspecting that notorious bandit leader Wraith is there, he is ordered to break up the auction and kill Wraith if possible. The raid goes badly, however, as the group are forced to open fire, resulting in the deaths of all of Travis' comrades along with several dozen slavers and scavengers. Calling for backup, Travis is told that due to solar flare activity he is not only alone but he cannot be allowed back into the safety of his home compound. Wraith, learning of the identity of his attacker, conducts a ritual sacrifice of a woman and swears before his men that the next sacrifice will be of Travis.

Abandoned in a small urban area, Travis ends up freeing three women, who he takes back to an abandoned local baseball stadium which he apparently uses as a part-time hide-out. Realizing that the third of the women is sick and needs medical attention, he takes the group to a clinic run by a friend, Dr. Latimer (Stuart Whitman). While there, he is led into a trap by a boy working for Wraith who steals weapons from his car. Although he escapes, the three women flee the clinic when the doctor reveals that he has been infected by the most recent flare. When Travis returns he finds the clinic abandoned save for Dr. Latimer, who he is forced to shoot.

Reuniting with the three women at the baseball field, Travis makes the decision to return to the compound and demand medical aid from his erstwhile employers. Upon return he finds that Wraith's men already have the bunker under siege, and any chance of saving those inside has passed. Despite making an attempt at buying some time for the survivors inside, Prescott reports that Wraith's men have breached the bunker, ransacked its armory and are overrunning it, killing everyone inside. Left with no other option, Prescott tells Travis that his one chance to kill Wraith is to use the store's explosives to detonate the bunker, killing everyone inside. Travis reluctantly agrees, and aided by his female companions he clears the exterior of the compound, liberates the explosives and levels the facility. From there, he and his companions cross the country to live around the untainted mountain lakes of Montana.

== Cast and characters ==
- Ron Marchini as John Travis
- Adam West as Prescott
- Troy Donahue as Slim
- Stuart Whitman as Dr. Latimer
