= Dakota (1988 film) =

1988 film by Fred Holmes

- Directed by: Fred Holmes
- Screenplay by: Darryl Kuntz; Sara Lynn Kuntz
- Starring: Lou Diamond Phillips; Lawrence Montaigne; John Hawkes; Jordan Burton; Eli Cummins; DeeDee Norton
- Cinematography: James Wrenn
- Edited by: Leon Seith
- Music by: Chris Christian
- Production company: Miramax Films
- Distributed by: Miramax Films
- Release date: December 2, 1988
- Running time: 97 minutes
- Country: United States
- Language: English

Dakota (also known as Harley) is a 1988 American drama film starring Lou Diamond Phillips and directed by Fred Holmes.

The film was reedited and rereleased under a different title in 1991, Harley.

== Plot ==
Dakota (Lou Diamond Phillips) is a troubled teenager on the run who takes a job at a Texas ranch to work off his debts. While Dakota restores an antique car, he becomes a pseudo big brother for the rancher's young son, Casey, who lost his leg to cancer. Dakota also begins to fall for the rancher's daughter, Molly.

== Cast ==
- Lou Diamond Phillips as John Dakota
- DeeDee Norton as Molly Lechner
- Herta Ware as Aunt Zard
- Eli Cummins as Walt Lechner
- Jordan Burton as Casey Lechner
- Steve Ruge as Bo Sandoval
- John Hawkes as "Rooster"
- Tom Campitelli as Rob Diamond
- Leslie Mullin as Cynthia Diamond
- Lawrence Montaigne as Mr. Diamond
- Connie Coit as Mrs. Diamond
- Susan Crippin as Alicia
- Robert Lemus as Eric Dakota
- Ben Jones as Mr. Dakota
- Cecilia Flores as Mrs. Dakota
- Rodger Boyce as Sheriff
- Kendall Thomas as Sheriff's Deputy
- Helena Humann as Gym Teacher
- Robert Ahola as The Mechanic
- Speed Ames as Arm Wrestler #1
- David Harrod as Arm Wrestler #2
- Lujenna Moseley as Bo's Girlfriend #1
- Robin Sloan as Bo's Girlfriend #2
- Michelle McHone as Girl In High Heels

== Soundtrack ==
An original score soundtrack for the film was released by CCM singer Chris Christian entitled No Lyrics released in 1988 on Home Sweet Home Records.
