= Army Archerd =

American columnist (1922–2009)

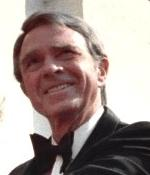
- Archerd at the 1988 Academy Awards
- Born: Armand Andre Archerd; January 13, 1922; Bronx, New York City, U.S.
- Died: September 8, 2009 (aged 87); Los Angeles, California, U.S.
- Education: University of California, Los Angeles
- Spouses: Joan Paul (m. 1944; div. 1969) Selma (Fenning) Archerd (m. 1969)
- Children: 2

Armand Andre Archerd (January 13, 1922 – September 8, 2009) was an American columnist for Variety for over fifty years before retiring his "Just for Variety" column in September 2005. In November 2005, Archerd began blogging for Variety and was working on a memoir when he died.

== Biography ==
Archerd was born in The Bronx, New York, and graduated from UCLA in 1941. He was hired by Variety to replace columnist Sheilah Graham (former girlfriend of F. Scott Fitzgerald) in 1953. His "Just for Variety" column appeared on page two of Daily Variety and swiftly became popular in Hollywood. Archerd broke many exclusive stories, reporting from film sets, announcing pending deals, giving news of star-related hospitalizations, marriages, and births. In 1984, he was given a star on Hollywood's Walk of Fame, in front of Mann's Chinese Theater, where he had emceed dozens of movie premieres.

One of his most significant scoops was in his July 23, 1985, column, when he printed that Rock Hudson, despite denials from the actor's publicists and managers, was undergoing treatment for AIDS.

Archerd was Jewish and a strong proponent of the Simon Wiesenthal Center and Holocaust awareness. He was married to Selma Fenning Archerd, a former actress, from November 15, 1969, until his death. They had one child and lived in Westwood, Los Angeles, California.

Archerd made four appearances on the popular, long-running game show The Hollywood Squares in the 1970s. His bluffs to questions from Peter Marshall became legendary, as he was able to fool contestants into believing his (often ridiculous) answers. Some say he was even better than the accepted champion in that regard, long-time participant John Davidson. Also in that decade, Archerd and his wife Selma made appearances on the game show Tattletales.

He made several appearances in TV series, including Burke's Law (1964), Hollywood Backstage, Batman (episode 39), Mannix (1967), and Marcus Welby, M.D., and films such as The Young Runaways (1968), The Outfit (1973), Won Ton Ton, the Dog Who Saved Hollywood (1976), Gable and Lombard (1976), California Suite (1978), The French Atlantic Affair (1979) and The Happy Hooker Goes Hollywood (1980).

Archerd died at Ronald Reagan UCLA Medical Center from a rare form of lung cancer (pleural mesothelioma), as a result of his exposure to asbestos in the Navy during World War II.

== Filmography ==
Year	Title	Role	Notes
1958	Teacher's Pet	Himself	Uncredited
1963	A New Kind of Love	Onlooker	Uncredited
1963	Under the Yum Yum Tree	Writer	Uncredited
1964	What a Way to Go!	TV Announcer	Uncredited
1964	Kisses for My President	Reporter	Uncredited
1966	The Oscar	Press Conference Reporter	Uncredited
1967	Rough Night in Jericho	Waiter	Uncredited
1968	Planet of the Apes	Gorilla	Uncredited
1968	Wild in the Streets	Himself	Uncredited
1968	The Young Runaways	Himself	
1970	Beneath the Planet of the Apes	Gorilla	Uncredited
1971	Escape from the Planet of the Apes	Referee	
1973	The Thief Who Came to Dinner	Newsman	Uncredited
1973	The Outfit	Butler	
1976	Gable and Lombard	Emcee	
1976	Won Ton Ton, the Dog Who Saved Hollywood	Premiere MC	
1978	California Suite	Himself	
1980	The Happy Hooker Goes Hollywood	Himself	
1981	The Devil and Max Devlin	Himself	
1986	Hyper Sapien: People from Another Star	Television Host	
1990	Repossessed	Himself	

1975 La Femme oubliée Columbo Army Archerd (lui-même) (VF : Jacques Thébault)
