= Adam West =

American actor (1928–2017)

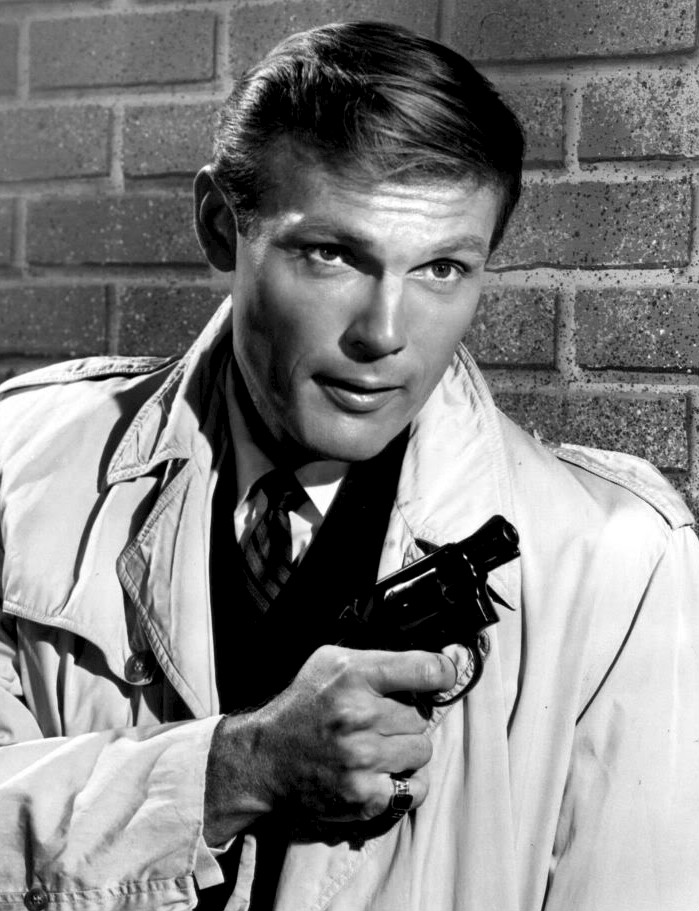
- West in a 1961 publicity photo
- Born: William West Anderson; September 19, 1928; Walla Walla, Washington, U.S.
- Died: June 9, 2017 (aged 88); Los Angeles, California, U.S.
- Education: Whitman College (BA)
- Occupation: Actor
- Years active: 1954–2017
- Spouses: Billie Lou Yeager (m. 1950; div. 1956); Nga Frisbie Dawson (m. 1957; div. 1962); Marcelle Tagand Lear (m. 1970)
- Children: 4
- Awards: Inkpot Award (1980)

William West Anderson (September 19, 1928 – June 9, 2017), known professionally as Adam West, was an American actor. He portrayed Batman in the 1960s ABC series of the same name and its 1966 theatrical feature film, reprising the role in various media until 2017. Having made his film debut in the 1950s, West starred opposite Chuck Connors in Geronimo (1962) and The Three Stooges in The Outlaws Is Coming (1965). He also appeared in the science fiction film Robinson Crusoe on Mars (1964).

He voiced parodied versions of himself in the animated television series Johnny Bravo (1997, 2004), The Fairly OddParents (2003–2008), The Simpsons (1992, 2002), and Family Guy (2000–2017). In Family Guy, he played Mayor Adam West between the second and seventeenth seasons. He received a television star on the Hollywood Walk of Fame in 2012.

== Early life ==
William West Anderson was born on September 19, 1928, in Walla Walla, Washington. His father, Otto Anderson (1903–1984) was a farmer descending from Scania in southern Sweden; and his mother, Audrey Volenne (née Speer; 1906–1969) was an opera singer and concert pianist who left her Hollywood dreams to care for her family. Following her example, as a young man West told his father that he intended to go to Hollywood after completing school. He moved to Seattle with his mother when he was 15, following his parents' divorce.

West attended Walla Walla High School during his freshman and sophomore years and later enrolled in Lakeside School in Seattle. He attended Whitman College but studied at the University of Puget Sound during the fall semester of 1949. He graduated with a bachelor's degree in literature and a minor in psychology from Whitman College, where he was a member of the Gamma Zeta chapter of the Beta Theta Pi fraternity. He also participated in the speech and debate team.

Drafted into the U.S. Army during the Korean War, he served as an announcer on American Forces Network television. After his discharge, he worked as a milkman before moving to Hawaii to pursue a television career.

== Career ==
=== Early roles ===
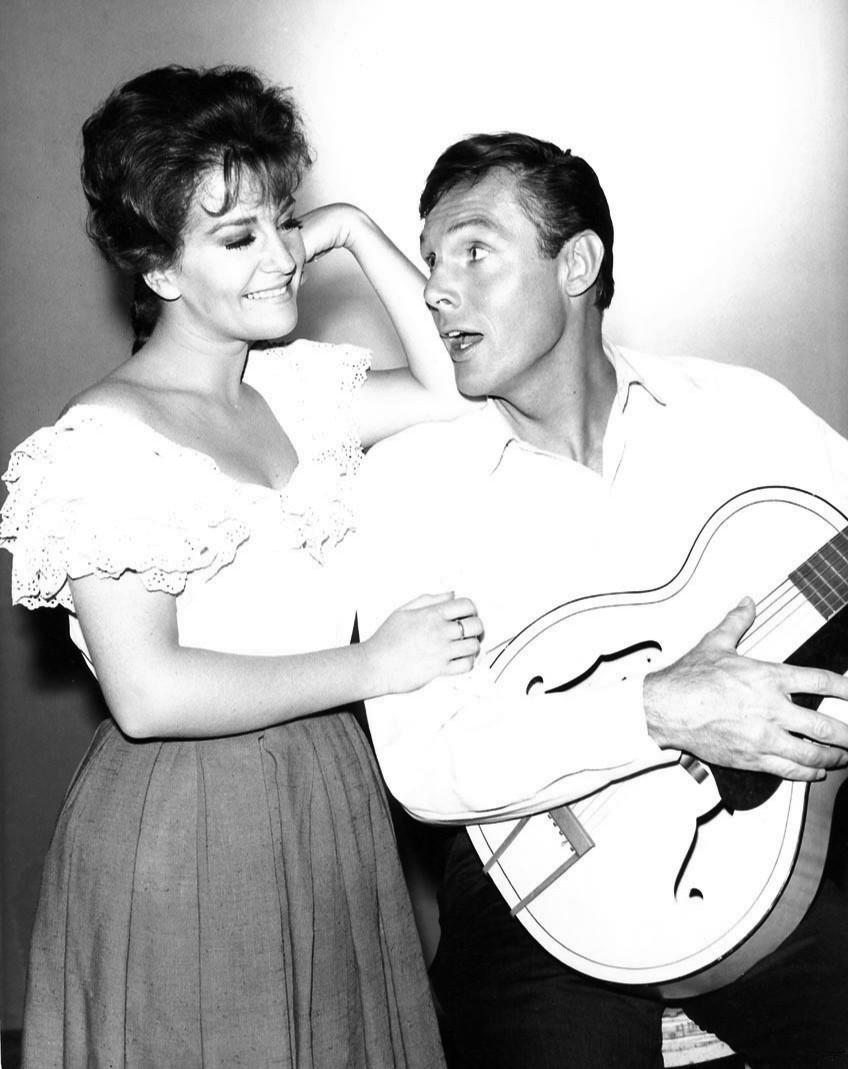
West with Anita Sands in a 1961 publicity photo for The Detectives

While in Hawaii, West was picked for a role as the sidekick on a local TV program, The Kini Popo Show, which also featured a chimp named Peaches. West later took over as host of the show. In 1959, West moved with his wife and two children to Hollywood, where he took the stage name Adam West.

He appeared in the film The Young Philadelphians, which starred Paul Newman. He had guest-starring roles in a number of television Westerns. On three Warner Bros. Television westerns which aired on ABC—Sugarfoot, Colt .45, and Lawman—West played the role of Doc Holliday, the frontier dentist and gunfighter. West also appeared playing different characters in two episodes of Maverick opposite James Garner: "Two Tickets to Ten Strike" and "A Fellow's Brother" in 1958. He guest starred in Warner Bros. detective series Hawaiian Eye and Bourbon Street Beat.

=== 1960s–1980s ===
On January 10, 1961, West appeared as a young, ambitious deputy who foolishly confronts a gunfighter named Clay Jackson, portrayed by Jock Mahoney, in the episode "The Man from Kansas" of the NBC Western series Laramie. He played Christopher Rolf in the episode "Stopover" of ABC's The Rifleman, which aired on April 25, 1961.

West made two guest appearances on Perry Mason in 1961 and 1962. His first role was as small-town journalist Dan Southern in "The Case of the Barefaced Witness". His other role was as folk singer Pete Norland in "The Case of the Bogus Books".

In 1959-1962, he became a regular on the American television series Robert Taylor's Detectives in its third season.

He made a brief appearance in the 1963 film Soldier in the Rain starring Jackie Gleason and Steve McQueen, and starred as Colonel Dan McCready, the ill-fated mission commander of Mars Gravity Probe 1 in the 1964 film Robinson Crusoe on Mars. That same year he was cast alongside William Shatner in the pilot for the proposed series Alexander the Great, playing Cleander to Shatner's Alexander. The series was not picked up, and the pilot was not broadcast until 1968 when it was repackaged as a TV film to capitalize on West and Shatner's later fame. West was apparently unsurprised by the rejection, later noting that "It turned out to be one of the worst scripts I have ever read and it was one of the worst things I've ever done."

In 1964, West played Dr. Clayton Harris, a handsome young physician, in two episodes of the sitcom Petticoat Junction. In the same year West starred in an episode of the ABC Outer Limits series titled "The Invisible Enemy". December 10, 1964, an episode of Bewitched titled “Love is Blind” was released, in which West played Kermit, an artist who marries Gertrude.

In 1965, he was cast in the comedy Western The Outlaws Is Coming, starring The Three Stooges. In the same year he starred in Mara of the Wilderness and in the Spaghetti Western The Relentless Four.

==== Batman ====
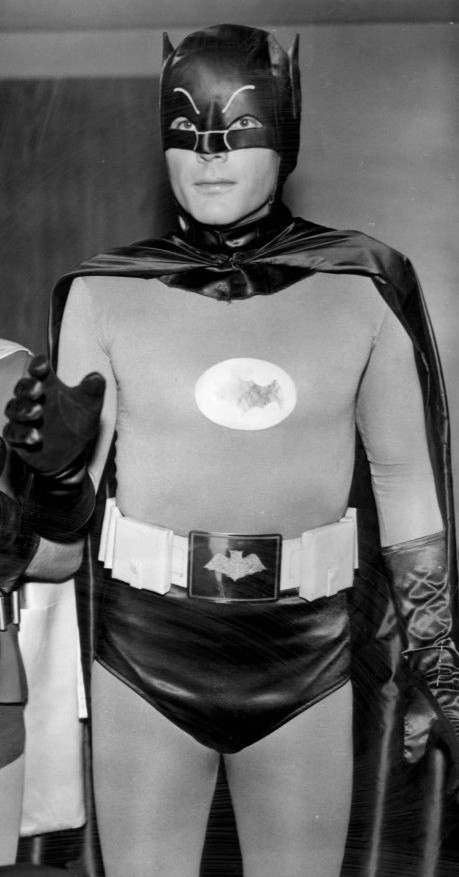
West as Batman

Producer William Dozier cast West as Batman/Bruce Wayne in the television series Batman, in part after seeing him perform as the James Bond-like spy Captain Q in a Nestlé Quik commercial. West was in competition with Lyle Waggoner for the Batman role.

The popular campy show ran on ABC from 1966 to 1968; a feature-length film version directed by Leslie H. Martinson was released in 1966.

In 1966, West released a novelty song Miranda as his Batman character.

Also in character, West appeared in a public service announcement in which he encouraged schoolchildren to heed then-President Lyndon B. Johnson's call for them to buy U.S. savings stamps, a children's version of U.S. savings bonds, to support the Vietnam War.

In 1970, West was considered for the role of James Bond by United Artists for the films Diamonds Are Forever and Live and Let Die. West would decline the role however as he felt Bond should be British.

==== Post-Batman career ====
After his high-profile role, West, along with Burt Ward and Yvonne Craig (who played crime-fighting sidekicks Robin and Batgirl), was typecast; all three found it difficult to find other roles. West's first post-Caped Crusader role was in the film The Girl Who Knew Too Much (1969). His lead performance against type as cynical tough guy Johnny Cain did not erode his Batman image; the film was a box office disappointment.

For a time, West made a living from personal appearances as Batman. In 1974, when Ward and Craig reprised their Batman roles for a TV public-service announcement about equal pay for women, West did not participate; instead, Dick Gautier appeared as Batman. After the series had ended, he appeared as Batman in a skit for the Memphis-based United States Wrestling Association, where he engaged in a war of words with Jerry "The King" Lawler while wearing the cowl and a tracksuit, and even name-dropping Spider-Man.

West subsequently appeared in the theatrical films The Marriage of a Young Stockbroker (1971), The Specialist (1975), Hooper (as himself; 1978), The Happy Hooker Goes Hollywood (1980), One Dark Night (1983) and Young Lady Chatterley II (1985). West also appeared in such television films as The Eyes of Charles Sand (1972), Poor Devil (1973), Nevada Smith (1975), For the Love of It (1980) and I Take These Men (1983).

West split his time between residences in Palm Springs, California, and Ketchum, Idaho.

He did guest shots on the television series Maverick; Diagnosis: Murder; Love, American Style; Bonanza; The Big Valley; Night Gallery; Alias Smith and Jones; Mannix, Emergency!; Alice; Police Woman; Operation Petticoat; The American Girls; Vega$; Big Shamus, Little Shamus; Laverne & Shirley; Bewitched; Fantasy Island; The Love Boat; Hart to Hart; Zorro; The King of Queens; and George Lopez. West was also in an episode of Bonanza that supposedly never aired until reruns were shown, and he made several guest appearances as himself on Family Feud. In 1986, he starred in the comedy police series titled The Last Precinct.

==== Return to Batman ====
West often reprised his role as Batman/Bruce Wayne, first in the short-lived animated series The New Adventures of Batman, and in other shows such as The Batman/Tarzan Adventure Hour, Tarzan and the Super 7, Super Friends: The Legendary Super Powers Show and The Super Powers Team: Galactic Guardians (succeeding original Super Friends Batman voice Olan Soule in the role). In 1979, West once again donned the Batsuit for the live-action TV special Legends of the Superheroes. In 1985, DC Comics named West as one of the honorees in the company's 50th-anniversary publication Fifty Who Made DC Great for his work on the Batman series.

West wanted to reprise his role as Batman in Tim Burton's 1989 Batman film, but never even received an offer due to the producers wanting a complete tone shift away from his campy portrayal. West expressed dissappointment with this and said if he were to receive the role, he would play the character differently. He was also a voice actor in various Batman-related animated series and films in addition to other projects connected to the TV series. West also guest starred in the Batman: The Animated Series episode "Beware the Gray Ghost" as Simon Trent, a washed-up actor who used to play a superhero in a TV series called The Gray Ghost and who now has difficulty finding work. He reprised his role of Batman in the Animaniacs episode "Boo Wonder" Season 5, Episode 3 of Animaniacs.

West suited up one final time in the full Batman outfit in 1997 for a photo session for TV Treasures magazine #1 titled "Adam West Remembers 30 Years of Batman". He had a recurring role as the voice of Marion Grange in the 2004–2008 WB animated series The Batman. West was the voice of Batman in the 2005 animated short film Batman: New Times. He co-starred with Mark Hamill, who voiced The Joker and had originally played the role on Batman: The Animated Series. West also voiced Thomas Wayne in a 2010 episode, "Chill of the Night!", of the animated series Batman: The Brave and the Bold.

In 2015, Adam West and Burt Ward announced that they would be reprising their roles as Batman and Robin (along with Julie Newmar as Catwoman) for two animated features to celebrate the upcoming 50th anniversary of the TV series. The first, Batman: Return of the Caped Crusaders, was released in theaters for one day on October 10, 2016, before being released on DVD and Blu-ray. The second, Batman vs. Two-Face co-starring William Shatner as Two-Face, was released on October 10, 2017, four months after West's death.

=== 1990s–2000s ===
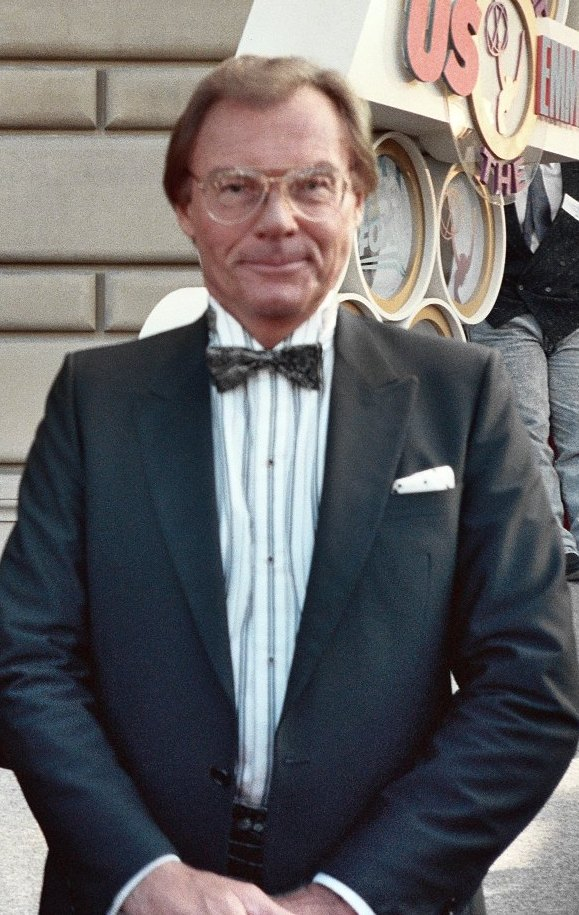
West in 1989 at the 41st Primetime Emmy Awards

During the 1990s, West's status as a pop culture icon led to appearances as himself in the film Drop Dead Gorgeous and in several TV series, including NewsRadio, Murphy Brown, The Adventures of Pete & Pete, The Ben Stiller Show, and The Drew Carey Show. He notably appeared as "Dr. Wayne" in the 1990 Zorro episode "The Wizard", even being shown Zorro's "secret cave" headquarters. In 1991, he starred in the pilot episode of Lookwell, in which he portrayed a has-been TV action hero who falsely believes he can solve mysteries in real life. The pilot, written by Conan O'Brien and Robert Smigel in their pre-Late Night period, aired on NBC that summer, but was not picked up as a series. It was later broadcast on the Trio channel, under the "Brilliant But Cancelled" block. In 1994, West played a non-comedic role as the father of Peter Weller's character in the Michael Tolkin film The New Age.

He played a washed-up superhero in the Goosebumps television series episode "Attack of the Mutant". The boy hero is a comic book geek whose favorite superhero, Galloping Gazelle (West's character), is portrayed as fading and on the verge of retirement. Towards the end, the boy is shocked to learn that the Gazelle is real, though he (the boy) must save the day by himself.

In 1994, West, with Jeff Rovin, wrote his autobiography, Back to the Batcave published by Berkeley Books. In 1997, Virgin Interactive released the gambling simulation game Golden Nugget. West acted in the video cut scenes of the "Chaos Mystery" storyline subgame. In 2001, he played the super-villain Breathtaker on the short-lived television series Black Scorpion.

In 2003, West and Burt Ward starred in the television film Return to the Batcave: The Misadventures of Adam and Burt, alongside Frank Gorshin, Julie Newmar, and Lee Meriwether. Jack Brewer portrayed West in flashbacks to the production of Batman. In 2005, West appeared as himself in the CBS show The King of Queens. He appears prominently in the 2006 video for California band STEFY's song "Chelsea" as "Judge Adam West", presiding over the courtroom scene.

In 2007, West appeared in a recurring role on George Lopez, as an attorney for George's mother, and he starred as "The Boss" in the comedy film Sexina: Popstar PI. Following the release of a Batman game, a host of the show X-Play visited West on the show. In 2009, West played himself in the episode "Apollo, Apollo" of 30 Rock.

=== 2010s ===
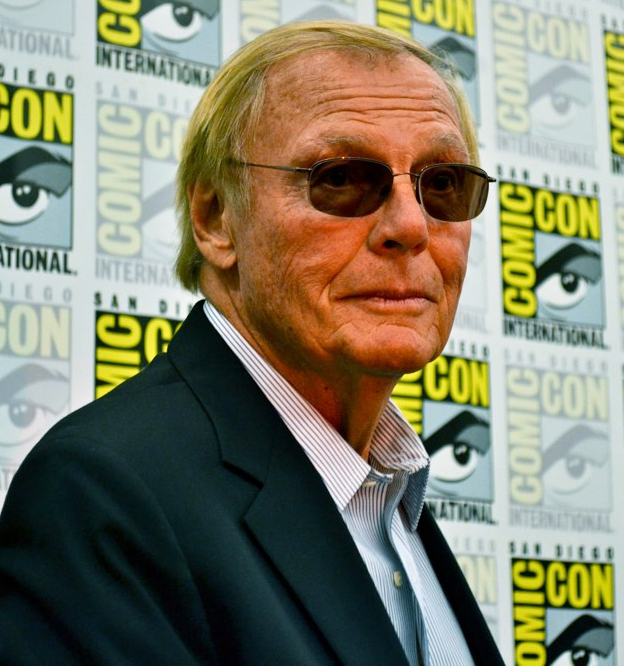
West at the 2011 San Diego Comic-Con

In 2010, a Golden Palm Star on the Palm Springs Walk of Stars was dedicated to him. West received the 2,468th star on the Hollywood Walk of Fame on April 5, 2012. His star is located at 6764 Hollywood Boulevard in front of the Guinness Museum in Hollywood, California. West appeared in a number of videos for Funnyordie.com.

He was interviewed in 2013 on the PBS series called Pioneers of Television in the season-three episode called "Superheroes". Also in 2013, he was the subject of the documentary Starring Adam West. West is among the interview subjects in Superheroes: A Never-Ending Battle, a three-hour documentary narrated by Liev Schreiber that premiered on PBS in October 2013.

In February 2016, West guest-starred as himself on the 200th episode of The Big Bang Theory. In January 2017, West appeared on the British comedy panel show Through the Keyhole, in which viewers and panellists looked around West's Los Angeles home by video. Walla Walla, Washington, Adam West's hometown, officially celebrates its annual "Adam West Day" on September 19, with the first one celebrated in 2017.

=== Voice-over work and advertising ===
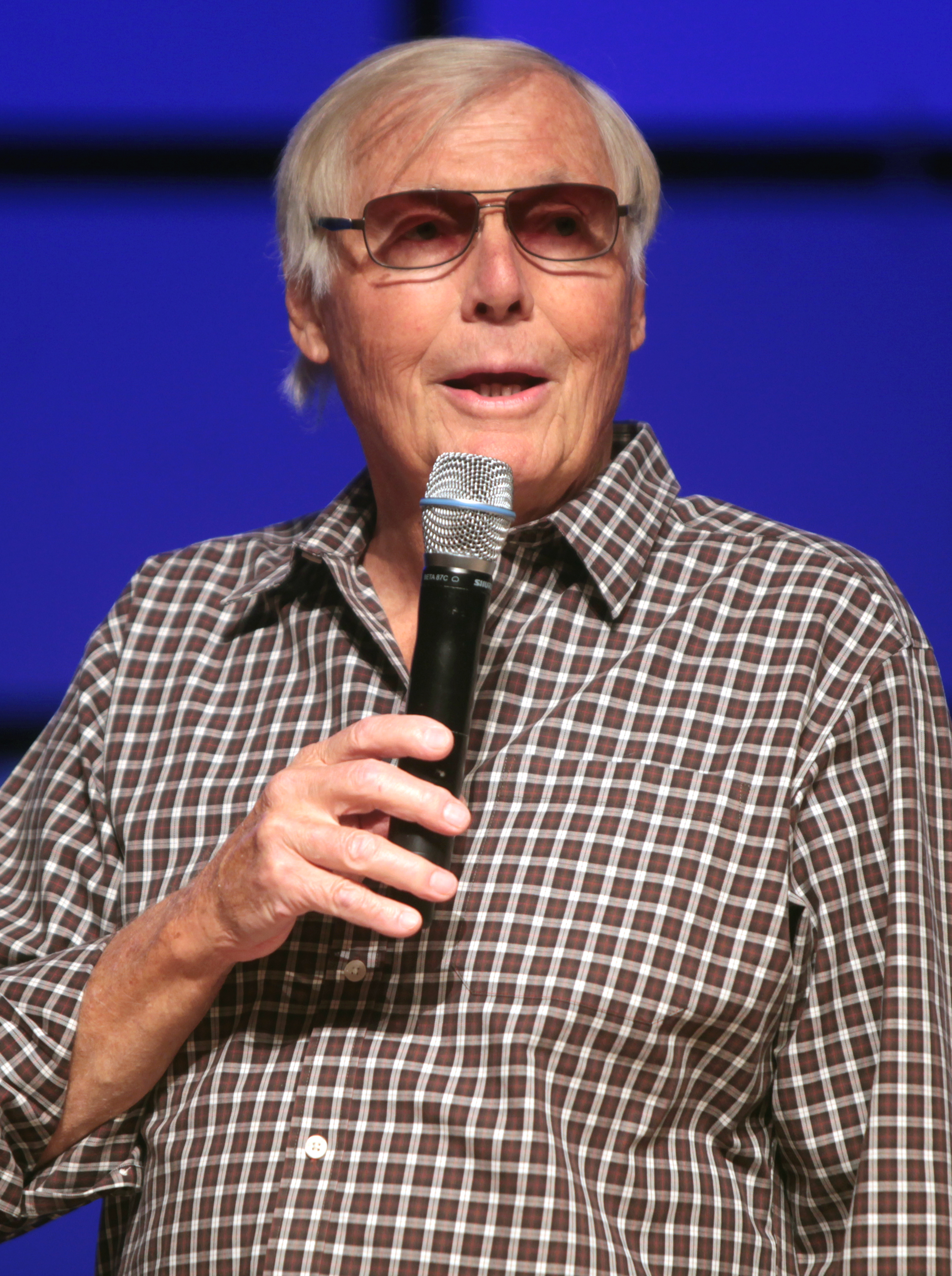
West in 2014

Having a distinctive voice, West built a career doing voice-over work on a number of animated series (often as himself), including appearances on The Simpsons, Futurama, Rugrats, Histeria!, Kim Possible, and Johnny Bravo.

He also appeared in many episodes of Nickelodeon's cartoon The Fairly OddParents as a cat-obsessed version of himself, who is famous for playing a superhero called Catman, and who actually believes he is Catman. His later appearance in The Fairly OddParents was a parody of himself, hired to play the role of the Crimson Chin in the film of the same name. Yet another appearance on the show had him as himself in a fairy-sponsored video about how to cope with losing one's fairy godparents. After West's death, he was replaced by Jeff Bennett.

In 1997, West appeared in a national television advertising campaign for Ziebart.

From 2000, West made regular appearances on the animated series Family Guy, on which he played the fictional character of the same name, who was the lunatic mayor of Quahog, Rhode Island. His role brought West a new wave of popularity post-Batman, and lead writer Seth MacFarlane claims to have gone out of his way to avoid typecasting West by deliberately not making any references to Batman.

Some of his last voice-over performances were playing the role of Uncle Art in the Disney Animation film Meet the Robinsons, and voicing the young Mermaid Man (along with Burt Ward, who voiced the young Barnacle Boy) in the cartoon show SpongeBob SquarePants, in the episode "Back to the Past" in 2010.

West also played the voice of General Carrington in the video game XIII, and voiced other video games such as Marc Eckō's Getting Up: Contents Under Pressure, Chicken Little: Ace in Action, Scooby-Doo! Unmasked, and Goosebumps: Attack of the Mutant.

In November 2014, West voiced himself, the 1960s version of Batman, and the Gray Ghost in the video game Lego Batman 3: Beyond Gotham.

In 2016, West was the voice of TV's Batman for the Batman '66 pinball game produced by Stern Pinball Incorporated.

West also did voice-over work for superhero-themed commercials for the investment firm LendingTree and television commercials for Hebrew National hot dogs.

== Personal life ==
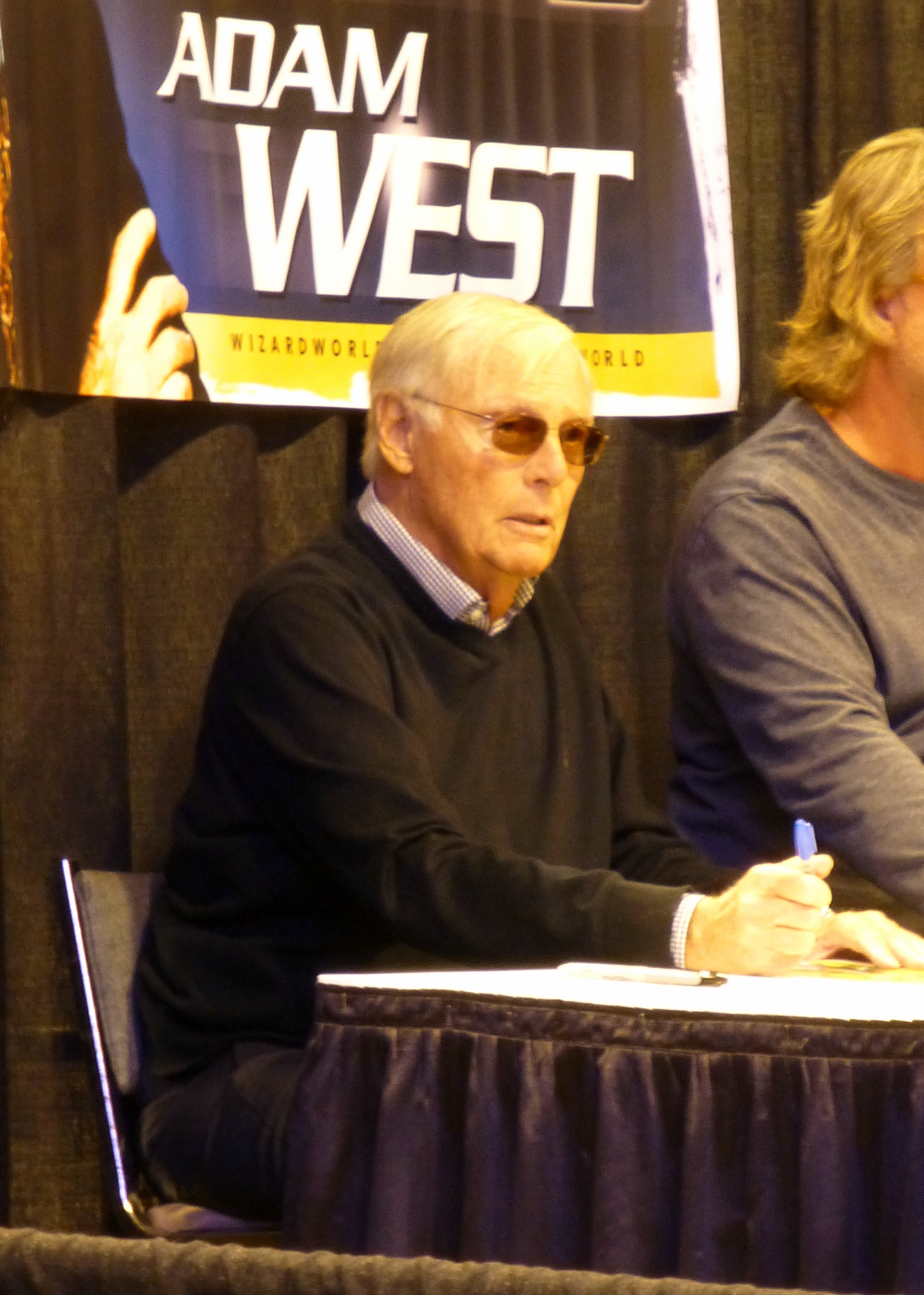
West at Wizard World St. Louis 2014

West was married three times. His first marriage was to his college girlfriend, Billie Lou Yeager, in 1950. The couple divorced six years later. In 1957, he married Cook Islands dancer Ngatokorua Frisbie Dawson (descendant of Robert Dean Frisbie and part of Elaine Matua Frisbie's Puka Puka Otea Tahitian Show) outside on the lanai at the Queen's Surf restaurant and night club across from Kapiʻolani Park on the Diamond Head side of Waikiki Beach in Hawaii. They had two children before their divorce in 1962. West then married Marcelle Tagand Lear in November 1970. They had two children and remained together for more than 46 years, until West's death. West also had two step-children.

During the Batman television series, West's relationship with co-star Burt Ward was jokingly described as "problematic". He said, "Burt fell victim to making up stories to sell books. But in a way it was flattering, because he made me sound like King Kong." West also said that he played Batman "for laughs, but in order to do [that], one had to never think it was funny. You just had to pull on that cowl and believe that no one would recognize you." Also during the Batman series, he became close friends with crossover co-star Van Williams, who played The Green Hornet. They were also neighbors for a while and spent much time together outdoors, including fishing and hunting.

== Death ==
On June 9, 2017, West died from leukemia in Los Angeles at the age of 88. He had kept his diagnosis private. In a statement, his former Batman co-star and longtime friend Burt Ward said:

This is a terribly unexpected loss of my lifelong friend, I will forever miss him. There are several fine actors who have portrayed Batman in films. In my eyes, there was only one real Batman, that is, and always will be, Adam West. He was truly the Bright Knight.

Batman: The Animated Series actor Kevin Conroy (who performed alongside West in the episode "Beware the Gray Ghost") said:

Adam West was an incredibly good, generous actor. Loved working with him as Gray Ghost. A true gentleman.

Family Guy creator Seth MacFarlane stated:

Family Guy has lost its mayor, and I have lost a friend ... Adam West was a joy to work with, and the kind of guy you always wanted to be around.

On June 15, 2017, Los Angeles projected the Bat-Signal on City Hall as a tribute to West, and in his hometown of Walla Walla, Washington, the Bat-Signal was shone upon the landmark Whitman Tower.

West had pre-recorded five more Family Guy episodes as Mayor Adam West, which were released posthumously as part of the sixteenth season. He also recorded the 11th episode of Powerless, which never aired due to the show's cancellation. NBC aired the episode online after West's death.

West's last public appearances were from March to April 2017 at the NorthEast ComicCon & Collectibles Extravaganza in Hanover, Massachusetts, where he was the guest of honor, Fan Expo Dallas, and Silicon Valley Comic Con. He was cremated at Hollywood Forever Cemetery. Following his death Family Guy paid further tribute to West making him the namesake of Adam West Regional High School in the show, which was previously named after fellow actor James Woods.

== Awards and nominations ==
Year	Award	Category	Work	Result
1967	Photoplay	Gold Medal-Favorite TV Program	Batman (shared with Burt Ward)	Nominated
1967	Laurel Awards	Male New Face	Himself	Nominated
1980	Inkpot Awards	Inkpot Award	Himself	Won
1995	CableACE Awards	Best performance in a Comedy special	1995 MTV Movie Awards (shared)	Nominated
2004	NAVGTR Awards	Best Voice Performance	XIII	Won
2004	TV Land Awards	Favorite Crimestopper Duo	Batman (shared with Burt Ward)	Won
2005	TV Land Awards	Favorite Crimestopper	Batman	Won
2010	Palm Springs Walk of Stars	Awarded a Star on the Palm Springs Walk of Stars in 2010	Himself	Won
2012	Walk of Fame	Awarded a Star on the Hollywood Walk of Fame on April 5, 2012	Himself	Won
2016	Behind the Voice Actor Awards	Best Vocal Ensemble in a New television Series	Pen Zero: Part-Time-Hero	Nominated
2018	Behind the Voice Actor Awards	Best Male Lead Vocal Performance in a TV Special/Direct-to-DVD Title or Short	Batman vs. Two-Face	Won

== Filmography ==
=== Film ===
Year	Title	Role	Notes
1957	Voodoo Island	Weather Station #4 Radio Operator	Uncredited
1958	Ghost of the China Sea		Uncredited
1959	The Young Philadelphians	William Lawrence III	
1959	The FBI Story	Man on Two Way Radio	Voice, Uncredited
1962	Geronimo	Lt. John Delahay	
1963	Tammy and the Doctor	Dr. Eric Hassler	
1963	Soldier in the Rain	Inspecting Captain	
1964	Robinson Crusoe on Mars	Colonel Dan McReady	
1965	The Outlaws Is Coming	Kenneth Cabot	
1965	Mara of the Wilderness	Ken Williams	
1965	The Relentless Four	Ranger Sam Garrett	
1966	Batman	Bruce Wayne / Batman	
1969	The Girl Who Knew Too Much	Johnny Cain	
1971	The Marriage of a Young Stockbroker	Chester	
1972	The Curse of the Moon Child		
1974	Hell River	Kurt Kohler	
1975	The Specialist	Jerry Bounds	
1978	Hooper	Himself	
1980	Warp Speed	Shuttle captain	
1980	The Happy Hooker Goes Hollywood	Lionel Lamely	
1982	One Dark Night	Allan McKenna	
1984	Hell Riders	Doctor Dave	
1985	Yellow Pages	Henry's Father	Uncredited
1985	Young Lady Chatterley II	Professor Arthur Bohart Jr.	
1986	Zombie Nightmare	Capt. Tom Churchman	
1988	Doin' Time on Planet Earth	Charles Pinsky	
1988	Return Fire	Carruthers	
1988	Night of the Kickfighters	Carl McMann	
1989	Mad About You	Edward Harris	
1989	Cartoon Lost and Found	Himself	Nick at Nite
1990	Omega Cop	Prescott	
1991	Maxim Xul	Professor Marduk	
1994	The New Age	Jeff Witner	
1994	The Best Movie Ever Made	Himself	
1995	Not This Part of the World		
1995	Run for Cover	Senator Prescott	
1995	Ride For Your Life		Interactive Film
1996	The Size of Watermelons	Himself	
1997	Redux Riding Hood	Leonard Fox	Voice, Short
1997	Joyride	Harold	
1997	American Vampire	The Big Kahuna	
1999	Drop Dead Gorgeous	Himself	
2001	Seance	Homeless Man, Angel	Also known as Killer in the Dark, released online in 2015
2002	From Heaven to Hell		
2003	Baadasssss!	Bert	
2003	Return to the Batcave: The Misadventures of Adam and Burt	Himself	Television film
2004	Tales from Beyond	Jay	(segment "The Bookstore")
2005	Aloha, Scooby-Doo!	Jared Moon	Voice, direct-to-video
2005	Stewie Griffin: The Untold Story	Mayor Adam West	Voice, direct-to-video
2005	Buckaroo: The Movie	Judge Werner	
2005	Chicken Little	Ace – Hollywood Chicken Little	Voice Cameo
2005	Angels with Angles	Alfred the Butler	
2007	Meet the Robinsons	Art	Voice
2007	Sexina: Popstar P.I.	The Boss	
2009	Ratko: The Dictator's Son	Kostka Volvic	
2009	Super Capers: The Origins of Ed and the Missing Bullion	Manbat, Cab Driver	
2011	Pizza Man	Himself	
2014	Sexina	The Boss	
2015	Scooby-Doo! and the Beach Beastie	Sandy Blake	Voice, direct-to-video
2016	Batman: Return of the Caped Crusaders	Bruce Wayne / Batman	Voice, direct-to-video
2017	Batman vs. Two-Face	Bruce Wayne / Batman	Voice, direct-to-video; posthumous release; dedicated in memory
2023	The Flash	Bruce Wayne / Batman	Archival audio; likeness used for CGI model

=== Television ===
Year	Title	Role	Notes
1954–1955	The Philco Television Playhouse	Ham Ector	3 episodes
1958–1959	77 Sunset Strip	Jim Beck, Lonnie Drew, Ernest Detterback	3 episodes
1959	Grand Jury	Fenway	Episode: "The Big Boss"
1959	Lawman	Doc Holliday	Episode: "The Wayfarer"
1959	Sugarfoot	Doc Holliday, Frederick Pulaski	2 episodes
1959	Cheyenne	Ashley Claiborn	Season 4/Episode 1 – "Blind Spot"
1959	Bronco	Major Carter	Episode: "The Burning Springs"
1959	Colt .45	Doc Holliday, Marshal Joe Benjamin, Sgt. Ed Kallen	3 episodes
1959	Maverick	George Henry Arnett, Rudolph St. Cloud, Vic Nolan	3 episodes
1959	Hawaiian Eye	George Nolen	Episode: "The Quick Return"
1959	Bourbon Street Beat	Deputy	Episode: "The Black Magnolia"
1960	Johnny Midnight	Jake Hill	Episode: "The Villain of the Piece"
1960	Overland Trail	Wild Bill Hickok	Episode: "Westbound Stage"
1960	Goodyear Theatre	David	Episode: "All in the Family"
1960	Westinghouse Desilu Playhouse	Johnny Cinderella	Episode: "Murder Is a Private Affair"
1961–1963	Laramie	Kett Darby, Deputy	2 episodes
1961	Tales of Wells Fargo	Steve Daco	Episode: "The Has-Been"
1961	Bonanza	Frank Milton	Episode: "The Bride"
1961–1962	Perry Mason	Pete Norland, Dan Southern	2 episodes
1961	Michael Shayne	Dave Owens	Episode: "Date with Death"
1961	The Rifleman	Christopher Rolf	Episode: "Stopover"
1961	Guestward, Ho!	Larry Crawford	Episode: "Bill, the Fireman"
1961–1962	The Detectives	Det. Sgt. Steve Nelson	Main cast
1962	The Beachcomber	Huckabee	Episode: "Captain Huckabee's Beard"
1963	The Real McCoys	Buzz Cooper	Episode: "The Crop Duster"
1963	Gunsmoke	Emmett	Episode: "Ash"
1964	Petticoat Junction	Dr. Clayton Harris	2 episodes
1964	The Outer Limits	Major Charles 'Chuck' Merritt	Episode: "The Invisible Enemy"
1964	Bewitched	Kermit	Episode: "Love Is Blind"
1965	The Virginian	Sam Loomis	Episode: "Legend for a Lawman"
1966–1968	Batman	Bruce Wayne / Batman	Main role
1966	The Milton Berle Show	Batman	Episode #1.2
1968	Alexander the Great		Unsold pilot
1968	The Big Valley	Major Jonathan Eliot	Episode: "In Silent Battle"
1971	Night Gallery	Dr. Jekyll and Mr. Hyde	Episode: "With Apologies to Mr. Hyde"
1972	Primus	Jenson	Episode: "Sea Serpent"
1972	Alias Smith and Jones	Brubaker	Episode: "The Men That Corrupted Hadleyburg"
1972	The Eyes of Charles Sand	Dr. Paul Scott	ABC Movie of the Week
1972	This Is the Life	GI Hank Mathes	Episode: "The Revenge of Cho Lin"
1972	Mannix	Jonathan Forsythe	Episode: "A Puzzle for One"
1973	Poor Devil	Dennis Crawford	Television film
1974	Emergency!	Vic Webster	Episode: "The Bash"
1975	Nevada Smith	Frank Hartlee	Television film
1976	Shazam!	Hercules	Voice, Episode: "The Delinquent"
1976	Alice	Mr. Turner	Episode: "Sex Education"
1977	The New Adventures of Batman	Bruce Wayne / Batman	Voice, Main role
1977	Police Woman	Morgan	Episode: "Guns"
1978	Operation Petticoat	Steve Fleming	Episode: "Bless You, My Sub"
1978	Tarzan and the Super 7	Bruce Wayne / Batman	Voice, Main role
1978	The American Girls		Episode: "The Beautiful People Jungle"
1979	Legends of the Superheroes	Bruce Wayne / Batman	2 episodes
1979	Big Shamus, Little Shamus	Harley Morgan	Episode: "The Loser"
1980–1984	Fantasy Island	Frank McKenna, Philip Breem	2 episodes
1980	For the Love of It	Jock Higgins	Television film
1981	Warp Speed	Captain Lofton	Television film
1981	Time Warp	Col. Ed Westin	Television film
1982	Laverne & Shirley	Edgar Garibaldi	Episode: "The Gymnast"
1983	I Take These Men	Craig Wyler	Television film
1983	The Love Boat	Bob Williams	Episode: "Doc's Big Case/Senior Sinners/A Booming Romance"
1983	Hart to Hart	David Stockwood	Episode: "Love Game"
1984	Super Friends: The Legendary Super Powers Show	Bruce Wayne / Batman	Voice, Main role
1985	The Super Powers Team: Galactic Guardians	Bruce Wayne / Batman	Voice, Main role
1986	The Last Precinct	Captain Rick Wright	Main role
1987	Murder, She Wrote	Wade Talmadge	Episode: "Death Takes a Dive"
1990	Zorro	Dr. Henry Wayne	Episode: "The Wizard"
1991	Lookwell	Ty Lookwell	Pilot
1992	The Ben Stiller Show	Himself	Episode: "With Colin Quinn"
1992	Batman: The Animated Series	Simon Trent / Gray Ghost	Voice, episode: "Beware the Gray Ghost"
1992	Rugrats	Captain Blasto	Voice, episode: "Superhero Chuckie"
1992	1775	George Washington	Pilot (and only episode)
1992; 2002	The Simpsons	Himself, Batman	Voice, 2 episodes
1993	Danger Theatre	Capt. Mike Morgan	4 episodes
1993	Tales from the Crypt	Chapman	Episode: "As Ye Sow"
1994	The Good Life	Himself	Episode: "John Hurts His Leg or Tales from the Crip"
1994	The Critic	Himself	Voice, episode: "Eyes on the Prize"
1994	Nurses	Mr. Greer	Episode: "All the Pretty Caseys"
1994	Space Ghost Coast to Coast	Himself	Episode: "Batmantis"
1995	The Adventures of Pete & Pete	Principal Ken Schwinger	2 episodes
1995	Muscle	Jim Atkinson	Episode #1.5
1995	Hope and Gloria	Himself	Episode: "Who's Poppa?"
1995	Lois & Clark: The New Adventures of Superman	Jerry Retchen	Episode: "Whine, Whine, Whine"
1995	Burke's Law	Dean Winters	Episode: "Who Killed the Toy Maker?"
1995	The Clinic	Horton Van Hoon	5 episodes
1996	Goosebumps	The Galloping Gazelle	Episode: "Attack of the Mutant" Pt. 1 and 2
1996	Weird Science	Himself	Episode: "Strangers in Paradise"
1997	Pauly	Himself	Episode: "Spies Like Us"
1997	The Wayans Bros.	TV Host	Episode: "The Black Widower"
1997	Murphy Brown	Himself	Episode: "Hero Today, Gone Tomorrow"
1997–2004	Johnny Bravo	Himself	Voice, 2 episodes
1997	Animaniacs	Spruce Wayne / Caped Crusader	Voice, episode: "Boo Wonder"
1998	Jenny	Himself	Episode: "A Girl's Gotta Hang with a Celebrity"
1998–1999	The Secret Files of the Spy Dogs	Dog Zero, Leonardo da Vinci	Voice, Main role
1998	Diagnosis: Murder	Bruce Blazer	Episode: "Write, She Murdered"
1998	Histeria!	Ernest Hemingway	Voice, 2 episodes
1998	NewsRadio	Himself	Episode: "Clash of the Titans"
1999	Pacific Blue	Macon Dean	Episode: "Stargazer"
2000–2018	Family Guy	Mayor Adam West	Voice, Recurring role
2001	Black Scorpion	Dr. Noah Goddard / Breathtaker	Recurring role
2001	The Drew Carey Show	Mitch	Episode: "Hotel Drew"
2003	Kim Possible	Timothy North / Fearless Ferret	Voice, episode: "The Fearless Ferret"
2003	The Mullets	Himself	Episode: "Silent But Deadly"
2003–2009	The Fairly OddParents	Himself, Catman	Voice, Recurring role
2003	The Bronx Bunny Show	Himself	1 episode
2004	Monster Island	Dr. Harryhausen	Television film
2004	Channel Chasers	Himself	Voice, television film
2004–2006	The Batman	Mayor Marion Grange	Voice, Recurring role
2005	The King of Queens	Himself	Episode: "Shear Torture"
2005	The Boondocks	R. Kelly's Lawyer	Voice, episode: "The Trial of Robert Kelly"
2007	George Lopez	Jonathon K. Martin	2 episodes
2008	Guiding Light	Himself	1 episode
2009	30 Rock	Himself	Episode: "Apollo, Apollo"
2010	SpongeBob SquarePants	Young Mermaid Man	Voice, episode: "Back to the Past"
2010	Batman: The Brave and the Bold	Proto-Bot, Thomas Wayne	Voice, 2 episodes
2011	The Super Hero Squad Show	Nighthawk	Voice, episode: "Whom Continuity Would Destroy!"
2011–2012	Jake and the Never Land Pirates	Wise Old Parrot	Voice, 3 episodes
2013	Futurama	Himself	Episode: "Leela and the Genestalk"
2015–2017	Penn Zero: Part-Time Hero	Captain Super Captain, Professor Evil Professor	Voice, 4 episodes
2015	Robot Chicken DC Comics Special III: Magical Friendship	'60s Batman, Robber	Voice, television special
2015	Moonbeam City	Razzle Novak	Voice, episode: "Stuntstravaganza"
2016	The Big Bang Theory	Himself	Episode: "The Celebration Experimentation"
2017	Powerless	Narrator, Chairman Dean West	2 episodes
2023	Batwheels	A.D.A.M.	Voice, Episode: "To The Batmobile", archive audio, Posthumous

=== Video games ===
Year	Title	Role	Notes
1997	Golden Nugget	Hugh Swain	
1997	Goosebumps: Attack of the Mutant	The Galloping Gazelle	
2003	XIII	General Carrington	
2005	Scooby-Doo! Unmasked	Winslow Stanton	
2006	Marc Ecko's Getting Up: Contents Under Pressure	Chief Hunt	
2006	Family Guy Video Game!	Mayor Adam West	
2006	Disney's Chicken Little: Ace in Action	Ace	
2007	Meet the Robinsons	Uncle Art	
2012	Family Guy: Back to the Multiverse	Mayor Adam West	
2013	Grand Theft Auto V	Unnamed Bobcat Security Guard	
2014	Lego Batman 3: Beyond Gotham	Himself, Batman (1966), Gray Ghost	
2014	Family Guy: The Quest for Stuff	Mayor Adam West	
2016	Batman 66 Pinball	Batman	
2026	Lego Batman: Legacy of the Dark Knight	Batman	Archive audio, Posthumous
