= Beware the Gray Ghost =

- Batman: The Animated Series episode
- Title card for the episode
- Episode no.: Season 1 Episode 18
- Directed by: Boyd Kirkland
- Story by: Dennis O'Flaherty; Tom Ruegger
- Teleplay by: Garin Wolf; Tom Ruegger
- Original air date: November 4, 1992

Guest appearances
- Adam West as Simon Trent / The Gray Ghost; Bruce Timm as Ted Dymer / "Mad Bomber"

Episode chronology
← Previous "See No Evil"	Next → "Prophecy of Doom"

"Beware the Gray Ghost" is the eighteenth episode of Batman: The Animated Series. It was directed by series regular Boyd Kirkland and was first aired on November 4, 1992. The episode features guest star Adam West, best known for his portrayal of Batman in the 1960s Batman television series. West plays an actor known for his role as the Gray Ghost, a character that resembles Batman antecedent The Shadow.

== Plot ==
The episode opens with a flashback of a young Bruce Wayne watching The Gray Ghost, a black-and-white television show, and the episode cuts between the flashback and events in the present mirroring the show: a whirring sound is heard, a building is destroyed by an explosion, the Gray Ghost goes into action while Batman does the same in reality, and the police receive a ransom letter in both settings from the villainous "Mad Bomber".

In the present Batman makes the connection between the explosions and the television show but does not remember the full synopsis, and the show's production copies were destroyed in a vault fire. To get information, he tracks down Simon Trent, who portrayed the Gray Ghost and is now unemployed due to permanent typecasting, and short of money as Simon ducks his landlord. After Simon's agent Frankie tells him that he didn't get the part he was auditioning for, Simon trashes the glass containers in his apartment containing his memorabilia out of frustration. He eventually sells his Gray Ghost costume and other memorabilia to toy shop owner and collector Ted Dymer in a last attempt to make ends meet, but the next morning finds that Batman has returned it all and repaired the broken cases with a letter telling him to meet him in an alley. Unsure of handling the case, he only gives Batman a copy of the show from his personal archive.

Learning the source of the whirring noises are remote-control toy cars armed with explosives, Bruce realizes the next target will be the Gotham Library. He defends the library yet is overwhelmed, but gets rescued by Trent, who is now wearing the Gray Ghost costume.

At the Batcave Batman reveals his own treasured collection of Gray Ghost memorabilia, citing his fictional exploits as a strong influence in his own career. However, they discover Trent's fingerprints on a captured toy car, implicating Trent in the bombing, but a stunned Trent realizes in horror that the Mad Bomber is Dymer, who is carrying out the attacks to raise money as he is obsessed with toys. Batman and Trent capture Dymer, and indirectly destroy his toy store and weaponry, with Dymer weeping over the loss of his toys.

Trent is recognized as a real-life hero, prompting a resurgence in the Gray Ghost's popularity. His complete archive of the Gray Ghost series is re-released, providing him with fresh income from distribution, a massive increase in the value of his merchandise, and a revitalized career. Bruce visits him at the product launch for an autograph, repeating what he said earlier: the Gray Ghost was, and still is, his childhood hero. Realizing that Bruce is Batman, Trent smiles. The scene then pans upward to show a poster cover of People Magazine with the Gray Ghost's return on the cover with a silhouette of a bat behind him.

== Voice cast ==
- Kevin Conroy as Bruce Wayne / Batman and Thomas Wayne (credited)
- Bob Hastings as Commissioner Gordon
- Efrem Zimbalist Jr. as Alfred Pennyworth, Piedmont Police Chief (uncredited) and Frankie (uncredited)
- Mari Devon as Summer Gleeson
- Joe Leahy as Narrator
- Bruce W. Timm as Ted Dymer / "Mad Bomber"
- Adam West as Simon Trent / Gray Ghost

== Reception ==
"Beware the Gray Ghost" has been very positively received by critics. The A.V. Club gave the episode an A and called it "smartly written and gorgeously animated".

== In other media ==
=== Film ===
- In the 2018 film Teen Titans Go! To the Movies, a theater sign appears, showcasing a double feature of The Gray Ghost and Zorro.
- A film called Beware the Gray Ghost appears in Lego DC Batman: Family Matters.

=== Comics ===
- The Gray Ghost appears in issue #3 of the Batman: The Animated Series tie-in comic Batman: The Gotham Adventures.
- The Grey Ghost appears in Batgirl (vol. 3), released in 2011 prior to the New 52. This version is Clancy Johnson, an aspiring sidekick of Batgirl until he is killed by the mercenary group Order of the Scythe.
- Simon Trent appears in Gotham Academy. This version is a director and playwright who becomes a teacher at Gotham Academy.
- In the Robin King's origin shown in Dark Nights: Death Metal: Legends of the Dark Knights, the movie the Wayne family saw at Monarch Theater instead of The Mark of Zorro was Beware the Gray Ghost.

=== Television ===
- In Batman Beyond, one of the original costumes for the Gray Ghost is on display in the Batcave. In the episode "Black Out", Bruce dons the Gray Ghost's hat and goggles to hide his identity from Inque.
- In the Justice League Unlimited episode "Epilogue", Terry McGinnis and his family are shown leaving a theatre playing The Grey Ghost Strikes. Andrea Beaumont was hired to kill Terry's parents there, recreating the origin of Batman, but refused to go through with it.
- In the Batman: Caped Crusader episode "Zero Hour", Carrie Kelley becomes a vigilante named initially Gray Ghost, before settling with the name of Crime Smasher, donning a costume based on that of Gray Ghost's.

=== Video games ===
- The Gray Ghost appears in Lego Batman 3: Beyond Gotham, voiced again by Adam West.
- A movie poster titled The Ghost in Gray starring Simon Trent with a depiction of The Gray Ghost appears in Batman: Arkham Knight, including Oracle's clock tower and Batman's secret base at Panessa Studios.
- A movie poster for The Gray Ghost appears in Kirk Langstrom's laboratory in Gotham Knights.
- The Gray Ghost appears in Batman: Arkham Shadow, voiced by Roger Craig Smith.
- The Gray Ghost makes a non-speaking cameo appearance in Lego Batman: Legacy of the Dark Knight. His costume is also available for Batman.

=== Audio dramas ===
- The Gray Ghost, as a radio show, is referenced multiple times in Batman Unburied.
