= Xaviera Hollander =

Dutch prostitute (born 1943)

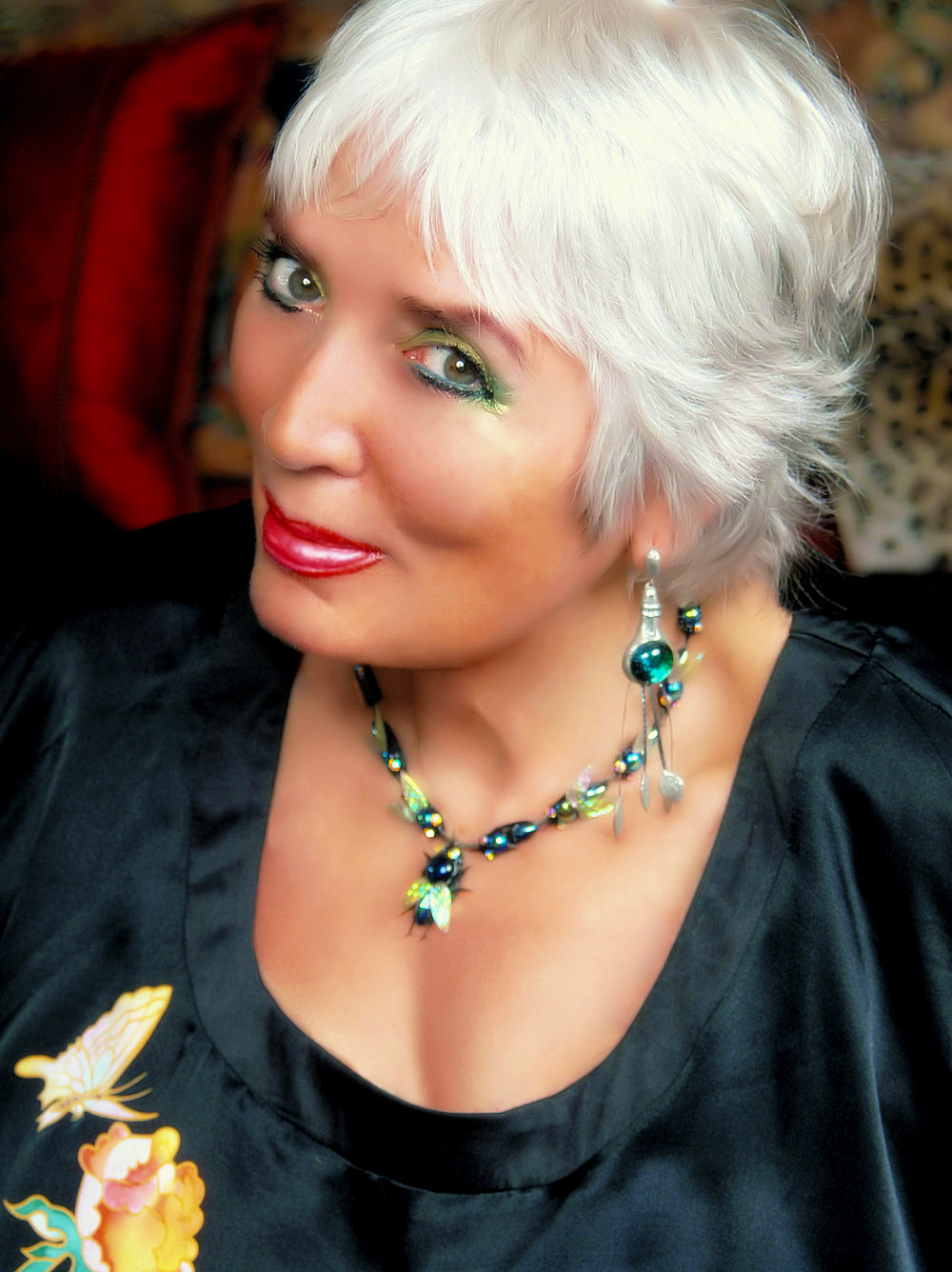
- Hollander in 2008
- Born: Xaviera de Vries; 15 June 1943 (age 83); Surabaya, Japanese-occupied Dutch East Indies
- Citizenship: Netherlands
- Known for: The Happy Hooker
- Spouse(s): Frank Applebaum (m. ?) Philip de Haan (m. 2007)
- Website: www.xavierahollander.com

Xaviera Hollander (born 15 June 1943) is a Dutch former call girl, madam and author. She is best known for her best-selling memoir The Happy Hooker.

== Early life ==
Hollander was born Xaviera de Vries in Surabaya, Japanese-occupied Dutch East Indies, which later became part of present-day Indonesia, to a Dutch Jewish physician father and a mother of French and German descent. She spent the first years of her life in a Japanese-run internment camp. After the end of Japanese occupation the family returned to the Netherlands.

In her early twenties she left Amsterdam for Johannesburg, where her stepsister lived. There she met and became engaged to American economist John Weber. When the engagement was broken off, she left South Africa for New York City.

== Career ==
In 1968, she resigned from her job as a secretary in the Dutch consulate in New York City to become a call girl, making up to US$1,000 a night (equivalent to $9,300 in 2025). A year later, she opened her own brothel, the Vertical Whorehouse, and soon became New York City's leading madam. In 1971, she was arrested for prostitution by New York Police and forced to leave the United States.

=== Author ===
In 1972, Hollander published a memoir, The Happy Hooker. Robin Moore, who took Hollander's dictation of the book's contents, came up with the title, while Yvonne Dunleavy ghostwrote it. Hollander later wrote a number of other books and produced plays in Amsterdam. Her second book, Child No More, is the story of losing her mother. For 35 years she wrote an advice column for Penthouse magazine, entitled "Call Me Madam."

=== Other ventures ===
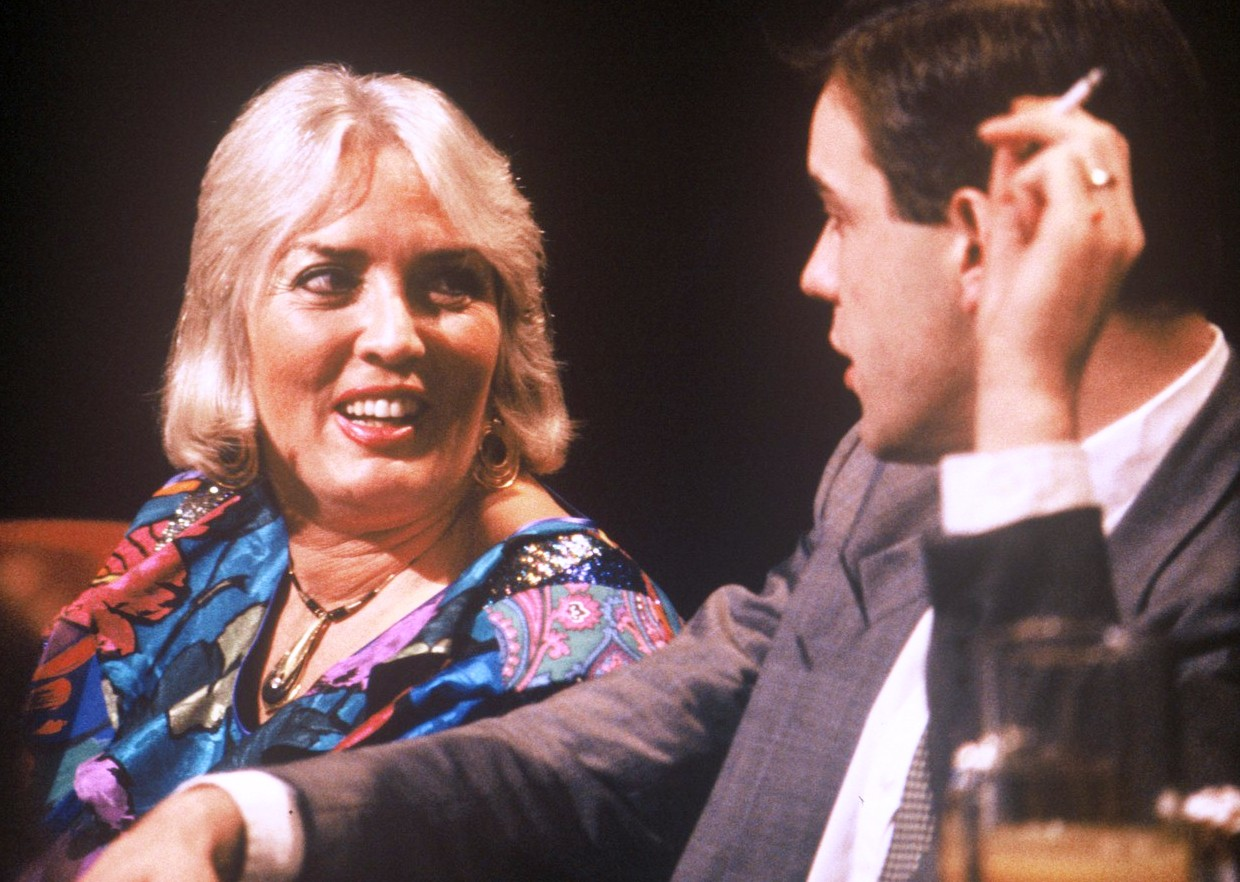
Appearing on TV programme After Dark in 1989

In the early 1970s, she recorded a primarily spoken-word album titled Xaviera! for the Canadian GRT Records label (GRT 9230-1033), on which she discussed her philosophy regarding sex and prostitution, sang a cover version of the Beatles' song "Michelle", and recorded several simulated sexual encounters, including an example of phone sex, a threesome, and a celebrity encounter with guest "vocal" by Ronnie Hawkins. Xaviera's Game, an erotic board game, was released in 1974 by Reiss Games, Inc. In 1975, she starred in the semi-autobiographical film My Pleasure Is My Business. Beginning in 2005, she operated Xaviera's Happy House, a bed-and-breakfast, in her Amsterdam home.

== Personal life ==
For several years in the 1970s, Hollander lived in Toronto, where she married Frank Applebaum, a Canadian antique dealer, and was a regular fixture on the downtown scene. She mentioned a lover named John Drummond, with whom she partnered for many years, co-authoring two books, including Let's Get Moving (1988) about their life together: "I went there with, who for years had been the love of my life, John Drummond, a wild Scottish intellectual who, at times, liked his whisky, beer, and wines too much. We had great sex, often up to three times a day — all that and he was about 17 years older than me." During a 2018 interview, she revealed a darker side of the relationship with the man she called "the love of my life!": "The love of my life, 25 years ago, John Drummond, a brilliant and boisterous Scotsman with a 'Thatcheresque' accent had, especially under the influence of a few scotches, beers, or wine, become quite destructive towards me. He is the only one who managed to deprive me of my self-esteem or identity, temporarily. He used to say that a British man’s way of saying 'I love you' is to put his woman down." Drummond is listed as one of her husbands. Hollander claimed to have "turned gay" around 1997, establishing a long-term relationship with a Dutch poet called Dia. In January 2007, she married a Dutch man, Philip de Haan, in Amsterdam.

== Other works ==
Hollander has been depicted in film five times:

- The Life and Times of Xaviera Hollander (1974, rated X) – Samantha McLaren
- The Best Part of a Man (1975) – Artistae Stiftung
- The Happy Hooker (1975) – Lynn Redgrave
- The Happy Hooker Goes to Washington (1977) – Joey Heatherton
- The Happy Hooker Goes Hollywood (1980) – Martine Beswick

She appears in at least two films:

- My Pleasure Is My Business (1975, Al Waxman) as Gabrielle
- Xaviera Hollander, the Happy Hooker: Portrait of a Sexual Revolutionary, a 2008 documentary directed, jointly produced, photographed and edited by Robert Dunlap. Hollander made additional contributions to the script.

In 1989, Hollander made an extended appearance on British discussion programme After Dark, alongside Mary Stott, Malcolm Bennett and Hans Eysenck, among others.

A musical about her life was written and composed by Richard Hansom and Warren Wills.

== Books ==
=== Non-fiction ===
- The Happy Hooker, first edition New York: Dell, 1972; first British edition London: Talmy, 1972. Written with Robin Moore, who took Hollander's dictation, and Yvonne Dunleavy, who transcribed the results. The strapline "My Own Story" appears on the cover of some editions.
- Letters to the Happy Hooker. New York: Warner Paperback Library. 1973. ISBN 978-0-446-78277-7.
- Xaviera!: Her Continuing Adventures. New York: Warner Paperback Library. 1973.
- Xaviera Goes Wild. New York: Warner Paperback Library. 1974.
- Xaviera on the Best Part of a Man. New York: New American Library. 1975.
- Marilyn Chambers (1976). Xaviera Meets Marilyn Chambers. New York: Warner Paperback Library.
- Xaviera's Supersex: Her Personal Techniques for Total Lovemaking. New York: New American Library. 1976.
- Xaviera's Fantastic Sex. New York: New American Library. 1978. ISBN 978-0-451-15104-9.
- Xaviera's Magic Mushrooms. Sevenoaks, Kent: New English Library. 1981. ISBN 978-0-450-05064-0.
- The Inner Circle. London: Granada. 1983.
- Fiesta of the Flesh. London: Panther. 1984. ISBN 978-0-586-06195-4.
- The Best of Xaviera. Sydney: Horwitz Grahame. 1985. ISBN 978-0-7255-1841-7.
- Knights in the Garden of Spain. London: Grafton. 1988. ISBN 978-0-586-07432-9.
- Child No More: A Memoir. New York: ReganBooks. 2002. ISBN 978-0-06-001417-9.
- The Happy Hooker's Guide to Sex: 69 Orgasmic Ways to Pleasure a Woman. New York: Skyhorse Pub. 2008. ISBN 978-1-60239-240-3.
- Wall Talk I: Prudent Bird of Paradise. Amsterdam: Amazon. 2024.
- Wall Talk II: Xaviera's Happy House. Amsterdam: Amazon. 2024.
- Wall Talk III: Getting Old is Not for Sissies. Amsterdam: Amazon. 2024.

=== Fiction ===
- The Erotic Adventures of Sandra. Aidan Ellis. 1982. ISBN 978-0-85628-110-5. "(Originally published in French as Madame L'ambassadrice, 1981)"
- Lucinda, My Lovely. Aidan Ellis. 1983. ISBN 978-0-85628-118-1.
- Lucinda: Hot Nights on Xanthos. Aidan Ellis. 1984. ISBN 978-0-85628-129-7. "(Originally published 1983)"
- Erotic Enterprises Inc. Aidan Ellis. 1985. ISBN 978-0-85628-142-6.
- Happily Hooked. Panther. 1985. ISBN 0-586-06399-4. "(Co-written with John Drummond)"
- The Golden Phallus of Osiris Trilogy:
  - Yours Fatally!. Grafton. 1987. ISBN 978-0-586-07039-0.
  - The Kiss of the Serpent. Grafton. 1987. ISBN 978-0-586-07040-6.
  - Prisoner of the Firebird. Grafton. 1988. ISBN 978-0-586-07041-3.
- Let's Get Moving. Grafton. 1988. ISBN 0-586-07431-7. "(Co-written with John Drummond)"
- Lucinda and Other Lovelies. Ellis. 1990. ISBN 978-0-85628-198-3. "Collects Lucinda, My Lovely; Lucinda: Hot Nights on Xanthos; and Erotic Enterprises Inc."

== See also ==
- Polly Adler
