= Karate Cop =

- Directed by: Alan Roberts
- Written by: Denny Grayson; Ronald L. Marchini; Bill Zide
- Produced by: Ronald L. Marchini; Garrick Huey; Jo-Anne Marchini
- Starring: Ron Marchini; David Carradine
- Cinematography: Hugh C. Litfin
- Edited by: Garrick Huey
- Music by: Cecil Ramirez; Ralph Stover
- Distributed by: Imperial Entertainment
- Release date: 1991
- Running time: 90 minutes
- Country: United States
- Language: English
- Budget: Unknown

Karate Cop is a 1991 direct-to-video martial arts action film. Also released as Dragon Cop, it is the sequel to the film Omega Cop. It is set in the post-apocalyptic near-future about a karate-trained police officer struggling to keep order in a chaotic, unstable totalitarian society. It stars Ronald L. Marchini in the main role; David Carradine makes a cameo appearance. Filmed in California.

== Plot ==
After an environmental holocaust caused by solar flares nearly destroyed the Earth the atmosphere is ridden with solar radiation and global temperatures had risen greatly. This catastrophe left almost every human on earth dead, devastated the environment, and causes societal collapse. Crime rates have drastically increased, and the few human beings left have decided to fend for themselves and much of the world has seen the rise of gangs of rampaging marauders. In post-apocalyptic America, the once-stable society has become a corrupt, crime-ridden totalitarian wasteland. The few remaining citizens are either hiding in devastated urban areas or are controlled by various gangs that now rule the cities with an iron fist. A former cop, John Travis, is a martial arts expert and spends his days undercover, walking across the barren urban landscape. Travis is doing his best to maintain some kind of order as the gangs slowly weed each other out by fighting in large arenas to create the most powerful gang and thus control the country.

== Cast ==
- Ronald L. Marchini as John Travis
- Carrie Chambers as Rachel
- Michael E. Bristow as Snaker
- D.W. Landingham as Lincoln
- Michael M. Foley as Lincoln's Champion
- Dana Bentley as Lincoln's Woman
- Dax Nicholas as Cal
- David Carradine as Dad
- Vibbe Haugaard as Mica
- Warren Reed as Fat Scav
- Jeffrey K. Lee as Sneaker
- Lorraine Swanson as Tess
- Denny Grayson as Priest
- Kelli Gianettoni as Dancing Dahlia
- Stephen W. Sargent as Danny
- Chris Ost as Cardplayer #1
- Mark Stevens as Cardplayer #2
- Frank O. Montelongo as Poolplayer #1
- Michael Pyper as Poolplayer #2
- J. D. Bristow as Black T-shirt
- Christopher John Reynolds as Last Attacker

== Release ==
The film was a direct-to-video release. The film received mixed to negative reviews from critics, who criticized the film for its acting and plot.

Rifftrax has released a riffed version of the movie on September 24, 2019.
