= Young Lady Chatterley =

- DVD cover
- Directed by: Alan Roberts
- Written by: Steven Michaels
- Based on: Lady Chatterley's Lover by D. H. Lawrence
- Starring: Harlee McBride; Peter Ratray; Lawrence Montaigne
- Music by: Don Bagley
- Production company: Young L. C.
- Release date: 1977
- Country: United States
- Language: English

Young Lady Chatterley is an American 1977 softcore pornographic film directed by Alan Roberts and starring Harlee McBride, Peter Ratray, and Lawrence Montaigne. The film was followed by a sequel in 1985, Young Lady Chatterley II.

== Premise ==
Cynthia Chatterley, the niece of Lady Chatterley, inherits her estate. There, she finds her diary and learns that she had an affair with her gardener. Inspired by this revelation, the betrothed Cynthia decides to have affair with her own gardener.

== Cast ==
- Harlee McBride as Cynthia Chatterley
- Peter Ratray as Paul the gardener
- William Beckley as Phillip, Cynthia's fiancé
- Mary Forbes as Frances Chatterley
- Ann Michelle as Gwen
- Lawrence Montaigne as Carl, the chauffeur
