= The Happy Hooker Goes to Washington =

1977 film

- Theatrical release poster
- Directed by: William A. Levey
- Written by: Bob Kaufman
- Story by: Barney Cohen
- Produced by: William A. Levey
- Starring: Joey Heatherton; George Hamilton
- Cinematography: Robert Caramico
- Edited by: Larry Marinelli
- Music by: Rudy Marinelli
- Distributed by: Cannon Films
- Release date: July 15, 1977
- Running time: 89 minutes
- Country: United States
- Language: English

The Happy Hooker Goes to Washington is a 1977 American comedy film directed by William A. Levey. It is the sequel to The Happy Hooker, which was released in 1975. Joey Heatherton and George Hamilton star in the film. The film was distributed by Cannon Films.

The film's tagline was, "She served her country... the only way she knew how!"

Joe E. Ross, Larry Storch and Rip Taylor are among the most prominent individuals who made cameo appearances.

== Plot ==
World-famous prostitute Xaviera Hollander is called to testify in front of the United States Congress.

== Principal cast ==
| Actor | Role |
|---|---|
| Joey Heatherton | Xaviera Hollander |
| George Hamilton | Ward Thompson |
| Ray Walston | Senator Sturges |
| Jack Carter | Senator Caruso |
| Louisa Moritz | Natalie Nussbaum |
| Rip Taylor | Photographer |
| Phil Foster | Senator Krause |
| David White | Senator Rawlings |
| Joe E. Ross | Night Watchman |
| Billy Barty | Little Man |
| Harold Sakata | Wong |
| Edy Williams | Professor Simmons |
| Larry Storch | Robby Boggs |
| Will Hutchins | Randall Petersdorf |
| Cisse Cameron | Miss Goodbody |
| Rolfe Sedan & Georgia Schmidt | Couple at Airport |

== Additional information ==
This film was also released under the following titles:

- En Washington los senadores están calientes - Spain
- Happy Hooker Vai a Washington - Brazil
- Xaviera Washingtonissa - Finland

== See also ==
- List of American films of 1977
- The Happy Hooker (1975)
- The Happy Hooker Goes Hollywood (1980)
