= The Happy Hooker Goes Hollywood =

1980 film by Alan Roberts

- Theatrical release poster
- Directed by: Alan Roberts
- Written by: Devin Goldenberg
- Story by: Alan Roberts; Devin Goldenberg
- Produced by: Yoram Globus; Menahem Golan
- Starring: Martine Beswick; Adam West; Phil Silvers; Chris Lemmon; Edie Adams; Richard Deacon
- Cinematography: Stephen Gray
- Edited by: Nicholas Wentworth
- Music by: Tom Perry
- Production company: Golan-Globus Productions
- Distributed by: Cannon Films
- Release date: June 4, 1980
- Running time: 88 minutes
- Country: United States
- Language: English
- Budget: $2 million

The Happy Hooker Goes Hollywood, released theatrically in the UK as Hollywood Blue, is a 1980 American comedy film directed by Alan Roberts and starring Martine Beswick, Adam West, Phil Silvers, Chris Lemmon, Edie Adams, and Richard Deacon.

== Plot ==
The film, the last of a trilogy, is loosely based on the life of Xaviera Hollander, a prostitute from the Netherlands, as she attempts to make a film in Hollywood based on her best-selling book about her life. She gets involved with some of the most crooked producers in Hollywood, but beats them at their own game and films the movie without them.

== Principal cast ==
Actor	Role
Martine Beswick	Xaviera Hollander
Adam West	Lionel Lamely
Phil Silvers	William B. Warkoff
Richard Deacon	Joseph Rottman
Edie Adams	Rita Beater
Chris Lemmon	Robby Rottman
Dick Miller	New York Cop
Charles Green	George
Lisa London	Laurie
Tanya Boyd	Sylvie
Susan Kiger	Susie
Lindsay Bloom	Chris
Army Archerd	Himself
Kim Hopkins	Young Xaviera Hollander
K.C. Winkler	Amber

London, Kiger, Bloom and Winkler were all in H.O.T.S, the year before in 1979.

== See also ==
- The Happy Hooker (1975)
- The Happy Hooker Goes to Washington (1977)
