= David Winters on screen and stage =

Works of English-American entertainer and filmmaker, Daniel Winters

David Winters (April 5, 1939 – April 23, 2019) was an English-American actor, dancer, choreographer, producer, film distributor, director and screenwriter. Winters participated in over 150 television series, television specials, and motion pictures. His accolades include two Emmy Award nominations, a Peabody Award, a Christopher Award, and many more. At a young age, he was seen acting in film and television projects such as Lux Video Theatre, Naked City, Mister Peepers, Rock, Rock, Rock, and Roogie's Bump. He received some attention in Broadway musicals for his roles in West Side Story (1957) and Gypsy (1959). In the film adaptation of West Side Story (1961) he was cast as A-rab. It became the highest grossing motion picture of that year, and won 10 Academy Awards, including Best Picture.

While Winters continued acting, he gained recognition for his dance choreography. He was frequently seen on television with his troupe David Winters Dancers in various variety shows most notably Hullabaloo (1965–1966) where he'd choreograph popularized several dances in the 1960s. He was a common collaborator of Elvis Presley and Ann-Margret including their hit film Viva Las Vegas (1964). Other dance choreography credits include T.A.M.I. Show (1964), Send Me No Flowers (1964), Billie (1965), and A Star Is Born (1976). For the TV movie Movin' with Nancy (1967), his choreography was nominated in the category Special Classification of Individual Achievements at the Emmys.

Winters eventually became a director and a producer starting with a streak of star-studded TV specials including Raquel! (1970) and Once Upon a Wheel (1971). His first theatrical release was the concert film Alice Cooper: Welcome to My Nightmare (1975) and his second the sport comedy Racquet (1979). He also directed The Last Horror Film (1982), starring Joe Spinell. Another directorial effort was the teenage romance skateboarding film Thrashin' (1986), starring Josh Brolin. In the mid-1980s, Winters opened his own production and distribution specializing in action films company, Action International Pictures. Up to the mid-2000s Winters continued producing films.

In his final years Winters continued acting most notably the television series Blackbeard (2006) and the film Teddy Bear (2012). He produced the historical epic The King Maker (2005). He also produced, directed, and co-starred in Welcome 2 Ibiza (2003) and Dancin': It's On! (2015).

== Stage ==
=== Actor ===
- On Your Toes (1954)
- Sandhog (1954)
- Shinbone Alley (1957)
- West Side Story (1957)
- Gypsy (1959)
- One More River (1960)
- Billy Liar (1963)

=== Associate director ===
- Of Love Remembered (1967)

=== Director and choreographer ===
- Goosebumps (1980)

== Selected filmography ==
=== Actor ===
- Studio One (1950, TV Series) - Tom Boyne (uncredited)
- The United States Steel Hour (1954, TV Series)
- Roogie's Bump (1954) - Andy
- Rock, Rock, Rock! (1956) - Melville
- Naked City (1958, TV Series) - Marty Nemo
- The Last Angry Man (1959) - Lee Roy (uncredited)
- West Side Story (1961) - A-rab (Jets)
- The Detectives Starring Robert Taylor (1961, TV Series) - Billy Joe Temple
- Take Her, She's Mine (1963) - Lester (uncredited)
- Captain Newman, M.D. (1963) - Patient (uncredited)
- The New Interns (1964) - Hood
- Burke's Law (1965, TV Series) - Special Agent James Martin (uncredited)
- The Crazy-Quilt (1966)
- Love on a Rooftop (1967, TV Series) - Augie
- The Last Horror Film (1982) - Stanley Kline
- Welcome 2 Ibiza (2003) - Uncle Sam
- Blackbeard (2006, TV Mini-Series) - Silas Bridges
- Hanuman klook foon (2008) - Stephan
- Teddy Bear (2012) - Scott
- Dragonwolf (2013) - Brutus
- Dancin': It's On! (2015) - Hal Sanders (final film role)

=== Choreographer ===
- Viva Las Vegas (1964)
- T.A.M.I. Show (1964)
- Send Me No Flowers (1964)
- Pajama Party (1964)
- Shindig! (1964)
- Girl Happy (Uncredited, 1965)
- Tickle Me (1965)
- Billie (1965)
- Bus Riley's Back in Town (1965)
- Kitten with a Whip (1965)
- Hullabaloo (1965)
- Made in Paris (1966)
- Lucy in London (1966)
- MJ's (1966)
- The Swinger (1966)
- Go (1967)
- Movin' with Nancy (1967)
- Monte Carlo: C'est La Rose (1968)
- Ann-Margret: From Hollywood with Love (1969)
- The Spring Thing (1969)
- The Special London Bridge Special (1972)
- A Star Is Born (1976)
- Star Wars Holiday Special (1978)
- Roller Boogie (1979)
- Dancin': It's On! (2015)

=== Film ===
Year	Film	Director	Producer	Writer	Notes
1975	Linda Lovelace for President	No	Yes	No	Erotic movie
1975	Alice Cooper: Welcome to My Nightmare	Yes	Yes	No	Concert movie
1977	Young Lady Chatterly	No	Yes	No	
1979	Racquet	Yes	Yes	Story	Story uncredited
1982	The Last Horror Film	Yes	Yes	Yes	
1985	Mission Kill	Yes	Yes	Yes (Note: Credited as Maria Danté)	
1986	Thrashin'	Yes	No	No	
1987	Code Name Vengeance	Yes	Yes	No	
1987	Rage to Kill	Yes	Yes	Yes	
1988	Space Mutiny	Yes (Note: Upon the first shooting day, it was announced to director David Winters that his father passed. Being emotionally troubled and with the funerals to attend, Winters was unable to perform his duties and passed it on to his assistant director Neal Sundstorm. However, he was informed that the investors had agreed to the film only if Winters was its director, and could face litigation, hence his credit.)	Yes	Yes	
1994	Raw Justice	No	Yes	No	Also executive producer
1995	Body Count	No	Yes	No	
1995	The Dangerous	Yes	Yes	No	
1997	Fight and Revenge	Yes	Yes	No	Lost film
2003	Welcome 2 Ibiza	Yes	Yes	No	
2005	The King Maker	No	Yes	No	
2015	Dancin': It's On!	Yes	Yes	Yes	Final film

=== Executive producer only ===
Year	Film	Notes
1976	Once Upon a Girl...	Erotic animated movie
1987	Killer Workout	
1987	Mankillers	
1987	Deadly Prey	
1988	Night Wars	
1988	Death Chase	
1988	Phoenix the Warrior	
1988	Operation Warzone	
1988	Hell on the Battleground	
1988	Dead End City	
1989	Order of the Eagle	
1989	Jungle Assault	
1989	Deadly Reactor	
1989	Rapid Fire	
1989	The Bounty Hunter	
1989	White Fury	
1989	Time Brust: The Final Alliance	
1989	Born Killer	
1989	Future Force	
1989	Shooters	
1990	Deadly Dancer	
1990	The Lost Platoon	
1990	The Revenger	Uncredited
1990	Future Zone	
1990	Invasion Force	
1990	The Final Sanction	
1990	Lock 'n' Load	
1991	Firehead	
1991	Raw Nerve	
1991	The Last Ride	
1991	Presumed Guilty	
1991	Maximum Breakout	
1991	Dark Rider	
1991	Cop-Out	
1993	Night Trap	
2000	Rhythm and Blues	
2003	Devil's Harvest	

=== Television ===
Year	Film	Director	Producer	Notes
1966	Lucy in London	No	Co-producer	TV movie
1967–1968	The Monkees	Yes	No	TV series; Directed 2 episodes
1968	Where the Girls Are	Yes	No	TV movie
1968	The Ann-Margret Show	Yes	Yes	TV special
1969	The Spring Thing	No	Yes	TV movie
1969	The Leslie Uggams Show	No	Yes	TV series
1969	Ann-Margret: From Hollywood to Love	Yes	Yes	TV special
1970	Raquel!	Yes	Executive	TV special
1970	The Darin Invasion	No	Executive	TV special
1970	The Sonny and Cher Nitty Gritty Hour	No	Yes	TV special
1970	The George Kirby Show	No	Executive	TV special
1970–1971	The Barbara McNair Show	No	Executive	TV series
1971	Once Upon a Wheel	Yes	Yes	TV documentary
1971	The 5th Dimension Traveling Sunshine Show	No	Executive	TV special
1971	Story Theatre	No	Yes	TV series; 1 episode
1971–1973	Rollin' on the River	No	Yes	TV series; Also executive producer
1972	George	No	Executive	TV series; 1 episode
1972	The Special London Bridge Special	Yes	Yes	TV movie
1972	Half the George Kirby Comedy	No	Associate	TV series
1972	Timex All-Star Swing Festival	No	Executive	TV special
1973	Dr. Jekyll and Mr. Hyde	Yes	Executive	TV movie
1973	Old Faithful	No	Yes	TV movie
1973	Saga of Sonora	No	Yes	TV movie
1976	The Lisa Hartman Show	No	Yes	TV special
1984	Steadfast Tin Soldier	Yes	No	TV movie

=== Video ===
Year	Film	Director	Producer	Notes
1982	Yoga Moves	No	Yes	
1984	That Was Rock	Yes	No	Concert video compilation
1984	Love Skills: A Guide to the Pleasures of Sex	Yes	No	Erotic documentary
1985	Girls of Rock & Roll	Yes	No	Video documentary
1990	Fatal Skies	No	Co-producer	Direct to DVD film
1990	That's Action	No	Executive	Video documentary
