= Stephen H. Burum =

American cinematographer (born 1939)

Stephen H. Burum ASC
- Born: Stephen Henry Burum; November 25, 1939 (age 86); Dinuba, California, U.S.
- Education: UCLA School of Theater, Film and Television
- Occupation: Cinematographer
- Years active: 1960–2004

Stephen Henry Burum, A.S.C. (born November 25, 1939) is a retired American cinematographer, best known for his work with directors Brian De Palma and Francis Ford Coppola. He was nominated for the Academy Award for Best Cinematography for his work on Hoffa (1992).

== Biography ==
Burum was born in Dinuba, California, a small Central Valley town near Visalia. He graduated from the UCLA School of Theater, Film and Television in the 1960s, and became an instructor at the same school. He began his professional filmmaking career working on the Walt Disney anthology television series, and then was drafted into the U.S. Army and assigned to the Army Pictorial Center, for whom he shot army training films. Returning to California after his service was complete, he worked on commercials, television shows, and low-budget films; he won a technical Emmy for his special-effects work on the popular public television astronomy series Cosmos: A Personal Voyage. He began working on major feature films for Francis Ford Coppola in 1976, shooting the second unit of Apocalypse Now and then The Black Stallion. His first credit as the cinematographer of a major motion picture was for The Escape Artist (1982).

In 2007, Burum returned to UCLA as the Kodak Cinematographer in Residence.

== Filmography ==
=== Feature film ===
Year	Title	Director
1969	Wild Gypsies	Marc B. Ray
1973	Scream Bloody Murder	Marc B. Ray
1973	The Bride (Note: Shared credit with Geoffrey Stephenson)	Jean-Marie Pélissié
1982	Death Valley	Dick Richards
1982	The Escape Artist	Caleb Deschanel
1982	The Entity	Sidney J. Furie
1983	The Outsiders	Francis Ford Coppola
1983	Something Wicked This Way Comes	Jack Clayton
1983	Rumble Fish	Francis Ford Coppola
1983	Uncommon Valor	Ted Kotcheff
1984	Body Double	Brian De Palma
1985	St. Elmo's Fire	Joel Schumacher
1985	The Bride	Franc Roddam
1986	8 Million Ways to Die	Hal Ashby
1986	Nutcracker: The Motion Picture	Carroll Ballard
1987	The Untouchables	Brian De Palma
1988	Arthur 2: On the Rocks	Bud Yorkin
1989	Casualties of War	Brian De Palma
1989	The War of the Roses	Danny DeVito
1991	He Said, She Said	Ken Kwapis; Marisa Silver
1992	Man Trouble	Bob Rafelson
1992	Raising Cain	Brian De Palma
1992	Hoffa	Danny DeVito
1993	Carlito's Way	Brian De Palma
1994	The Shadow	Russell Mulcahy
1996	Mission: Impossible	Brian De Palma
1997	Fathers' Day	Ivan Reitman
1998	Snake Eyes	Brian De Palma
1999	Mystery Men	Kinka Usher
2000	Mission to Mars	Brian De Palma
2002	Life or Something Like It	Stephen Herek
2004	Confessions of a Teenage Drama Queen	Sara Sugarman

=== Television ===
TV specials

Year	Title	Director
1970	Raquel!	David Winters
1979	The Bee Gees Special	Louis J. Horvitz
1979	The T.V. Show	Tom Trbovich

Documentary film

Year	Title	Director	Notes
1971	Once Upon a Wheel	David Winters	With Robert Isenberg, Michael Lonzo, Harmon Lougher, John M. Stephens, Craig Stewart and Mark Zavad

== Awards and nominations ==
Year	Award	Category	Title	Result	Ref.
1992	Academy Awards	Best Cinematography	Hoffa	Nominated	
1987	American Society of Cinematographers	Outstanding Achievement in Cinematography	The Untouchables	Nominated	
1989	American Society of Cinematographers	Outstanding Achievement in Cinematography	The War of the Roses	Nominated	
1992	American Society of Cinematographers	Outstanding Achievement in Cinematography	Hoffa	Won	
2008	American Society of Cinematographers	Lifetime Achievement Award		Won	
2022	Camerimage	Lifetime Achievement Award		Won	
