= List of rediscovered film footage =

This is a list of rediscovered film footage, i.e. for incomplete films for which missing parts were found. See List of incomplete or partially lost films and List of rediscovered films for films which were thought to have been entirely lost.

== Silent films ==
=== 1910s ===
Year	Film	Director	Cast	Notes	Ref
1918	The Scarlet Drop	John Ford	Harry Carey Sr.	Just over 30 minutes of footage of the film was all that was thought to have survived in the Getty Images until 2024, when a complete film cut in excellent condition overall was discovered by the owner of a warehouse in Santiago, Chile.	

=== 1920s ===
Year	Film	Director	Cast	Notes	Ref
1923	Lost and Found on a South Sea Island	Raoul Walsh	House Peters, Pauline Starke	Originally, only one reel was known to have survived, according to a recent biography of Walsh. However, a complete print was found in the Italian archive Cineteca Del Friuli in Gemona.	
1923	Rosita	Ernst Lubitsch	Mary Pickford	While Mary Pickford carefully preserved most of her filmography, she allowed Rosita to decay, save for the film's fourth reel, and no complete prints of the film were thought to exist. However, in the 1960s a nitrate print was discovered in the Russian film archives and repatriated by the Museum of Modern Art. A safety preservation negative was made from the nitrate print, but no further work was done on the film.	
1924	Detained	Scott Pembroke, Joe Rock	Stan Laurel	Missing scenes found and restored by Fries Film Archief, Netherlands, 2017.	
1927	The Battle of the Century	Clyde Bruckman	Laurel and Hardy	For decades, the excerpt included in the 1957 compilation film The Golden Age of Comedy was thought to be the only remaining footage, until the first reel (featuring a boxing match) was found in the late 1970s, but scenes featuring Eugene Pallette, and a final climactic gag showing a cop receiving a pie in the face were missing until the second reel was discovered in a private collection in June 2015.	
1927	Metropolis	Fritz Lang	Gustav Fröhlich, Brigitte Helm	After the German premiere, nearly a quarter of Metropolis was cut. Over the years, some of the missing footage resurfaced. In 2008, two different versions of the film were found: one by Museo del Cine from Buenos Aires, Argentina, and another in the National Film Archive of New Zealand. Both versions were then edited into one cut to get as near the original version as possible.	
1927	Napoléon	Abel Gance	Albert Dieudonné, Gina Manès, Antonin Artaud, Edmond Van Daële	Gance destroyed the original uncut negatives that lasted 6 hours in the 1950s, but film historian Kevin Brownlow tracked down various prints of the film and made a final cut lasting 5 hours.	
1928	The Passion of Joan of Arc	Carl Theodor Dreyer	Renée Jeanne Falconetti	The truncated reissue was thought all that remained, until Dreyer's original cut was found in 1981 in the closet of a Norwegian mental institution.	
1929	The Mysterious Island	Lucien Hubbard	Lionel Barrymore	Until recently, only one reel with a color sequence was thought to have survived, until the complete Technicolor print was discovered in Prague in December 2013.	

== Sound films ==
=== 1930s ===
Year	Film	Director	Cast	Notes	Ref
1933	Baby Face	Alfred E. Green	Barbara Stanwyck, George Brent	The film was quickly pulled from distribution because of multiple violations of the Production Code. A few scenes were cut, while a few others were replaced. In 2004, an uncensored version was located in a Library of Congress film vault in Dayton, Ohio, and premiered at London Film Festival.	

=== 1960s ===
Year	Film	Director	Cast	Notes	Ref
1962	King Kong vs. Godzilla	Ishirō Honda	Tomoyuki Tanaka, Shinichi Sekizawa	A few years later after its release in Japan, Toho made extensive cuts to the film and re-released it. Later, Toho made even more cuts for future re-releases, and the removed footage then went lost. During the 1980s, numerous efforts were made to find the missing scenes, but nothing turned up until the 1990s and 2000s, when all these scenes were found. After recovery, Toho re-released the film once more, with all the missing footage restored.	

=== 1980s ===
Year	Film	Director	Cast	Notes	Ref
1982	The Last Horror Film	David Winters	Joe Spinell, Caroline Munro	After its initial release much of the film's gore was edited out from the original negative. For its 2023 Ultra HD Blu-ray re-release, a 35mm print of the film in excellent condition was located, allowing for the director's original vision to be released.	
