= Jordan Clark (actress) =

Canadian dancer and actress (born 1991)

- Born: Okotoks, Alberta, Canada
- Citizenship: Canadian
- Occupations: Actress; dancer
- Years active: 2010–present
- Spouse: Trevor Tordjman (m. 2023)

Jordan Clark (born December 29, 1991) is a Canadian actress and dancer. She came 1st the fourth season of the dance competition series So You Think You Can Dance Canada. She played Giselle on the Family Channel teen drama series The Next Step. She was in seasons 1 to 3 when her character was planned to go on a tour. She returned for the 10th and last season of The Next Step. Her character is extremely bendy and her personality on the show is bubbly.

== Personal life ==
Clark was born on December 29, 1991, in Okotoks, Alberta to parents Glenn Clark and Connie Tainsh. She grew up in Tottenham, Ontario with a younger brother and sister, and an adopted older sister.

Clark originally did not intend to dance, and rather wanted be a gymnast after being inspired seeing a gymnast perform a back tuck. After not being able to find a gymnastic club in her town, her mother enrolled her in a dance school where she could learn acro. In a podcast, Clark recalls, "Seeing ballet barres and being very upset with my mother." Clark eventually found a love for ballet, which led her to more dance, learning a variety of styles from a young age, including, acro, jazz, lyrical, tap, and ballet. As a young child, she auditioned at The National Ballet of Canada and was accepted into their summer program. Clark was not a very good dancer when she began training but found that she was naturally very flexible. At her dance studios, she was left out of competitions, though performed in her first competition at eight, in which she performed an acro solo in a snake costume, wearing a snake unitard and headpiece. Later she went to dance at Vlad's Dance Academy, training 35–40 hours a week.

In January 2022, Clark posted on her official Instagram the announcement of her engagement to her co-star Trevor Tordjman. They married on September 16, 2023.

== Career ==
At eighteen, Clark auditioned for season 4 of So You Think You Can Dance Canada. She was named the winner of season 4 with a jazz duet to "Skin", by Rihanna, in which her partner, Christian Millette, was eliminated. Before winning So You Think You Can Dance Canada, Clark appeared as a student in the 2010 film Harriet the Spy: Blog Wars. and as a camper and dancer in Disney Channel's 2010 television film Camp Rock 2: The Final Jam. She played a friend and a dancer at a birthday party in Disney Channel's 2012 television film Frenemies.

In the summer of 2012, at twenty years old, Clark auditioned for a role on the Canadian teen drama series, The Next Step. She was called in a group of ten to do a piece of choreography and was selected out of her group to answer questions about themselves. She received a final callback along with fellow castmate Alexandra Beaton. She met Victoria Baldesarra during filming and recognized her from when Victoria competed against her younger sister, as Victoria was only thirteen. Clark was a main cast member on The Next Step from the first to third season, with guest appearances in the fourth, sixth, eight, ninth and ten season, and in the series' double-episode Christmas Special. Clark also had a recurring role on The Next Step spin-off series, Lost & Found Music Studios.

In 2015, Clark played Shotsy in the film Dancin': It's On! In 2016, she guest starred in the Canadian television series, Private Eyes, as a dancer. In 2020, she starred as homeroom teacher/gymnastics coach Miss Allister in My Perfect Landing, a Canadian television series about gymnastics created by Frank Van Keeken, who also created The Next Step. In 2023 and 2024, she played dance teacher Victoria Vance on seasons 6 and 7 of Bunk'd.

Clark also works part-time at The Audience Dance Rivalry in Concord, Ontario and at On The Floor Dance alongside former co-star Jennifer Pappas in Richmond Hill, Ontario.

== Filmography ==
=== Film ===
Year	Title	Role	Notes
2010	Harriet the Spy: Blog Wars	Dancer	Television film
2010	Camp Rock 2: The Final Jam	Camp Rock Dancer	Television film
2012	Frenemies	Female Dancer	Television film
2015	The Next Step Live: The Movie	Herself	Documentary film
2015	Dancin': It's On!	Shotsy	
2021	Left for Dead: The Ashley Reeves Story	Chloe	Television film

=== Television roles ===
Year	Title	Role	Notes
2011	So You Think You Can Dance Canada	Herself	Contestant: winner (season 4)
2013	Unsung: Behind The Glee	Herself	Show Choir Canada Nationals Host
2013-2016, 2018, 2020, 2022, 2025	The Next Step	Giselle	Main role (seasons 1–3); guest role (seasons 4, 7, 10); recurring role (season 6, 8) 94 episodes
2015-2016	Lost & Found Music Studios	Giselle	Recurring role
2016	Private Eyes	Raven	Episode: "Dance, Dance Retribution"
2020	My Perfect Landing	Miss Allister	Main role
2023-2024	Bunk'd	Victoria Vance	Recurring role; 5 episodes
2025	Murdoch Mysteries	Connie Courtland	Episode: "Shakespeare's Beard"
2025	Vampirina: Teenage Vampire	Ms. Etherton	Episode: "First Day of School"
