= Jimmy Cavallo =

American musician (1927–2019)

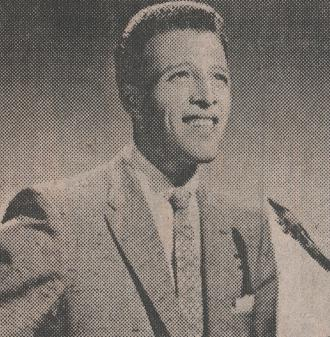
- Cavallo in 1949

Background information
- Born: March 14, 1927; Syracuse, New York, United States
- Died: December 2, 2019 (aged 92) Pompano Beach, Florida, U.S.

James Cavallo (March 14, 1927 – December 2, 2019) was an American musician best known for performing with his band in the 1956 movie Rock, Rock, Rock, produced by pioneering music DJ Alan Freed. Jimmy and the Houserockers were the first white band to play at the Apollo Theater in Harlem, where they celebrated the movie's release.

== Starting out in Syracuse, NY ==
When Cavallo was in high school in Syracuse in the early 1940s, he played harmony on alto sax in a swing band. Wanting to perform melody lines, sing, and lead a band, Cavallo began studying Louis Jordan records along with other jump blues recordings, and switched to tenor sax. At around age 16, he formed his own band, primarily performing at local community events.

== The Navy and North Carolina ==
When he left home to serve in the United States Navy at the end of World War II, Cavallo took his saxophone with him. While stationed in North Carolina and Washington, D.C., he spent his free time attending musical venues and playing alongside musicians in early rhythm and blues and rock and roll.

Upon his discharge in 1947, Cavallo formed the Jimmy Cavallo Quartet in North Carolina, performing R&B covers and original songs. The lineup consisted of Bobby Wrenn on drums, Max Alexander on bass, and Bobby Hass and Diz Utley on saxophones. The group played across North Carolina during 1947–1948 and held a regular residency in 1949 at the Bop City dance club in Carolina Beach.

He returned to Syracuse in late 1949, performing regularly at local venues and at Sylvan Beach on Oneida Lake. In 1951, he recorded tracks for the local BSD label.

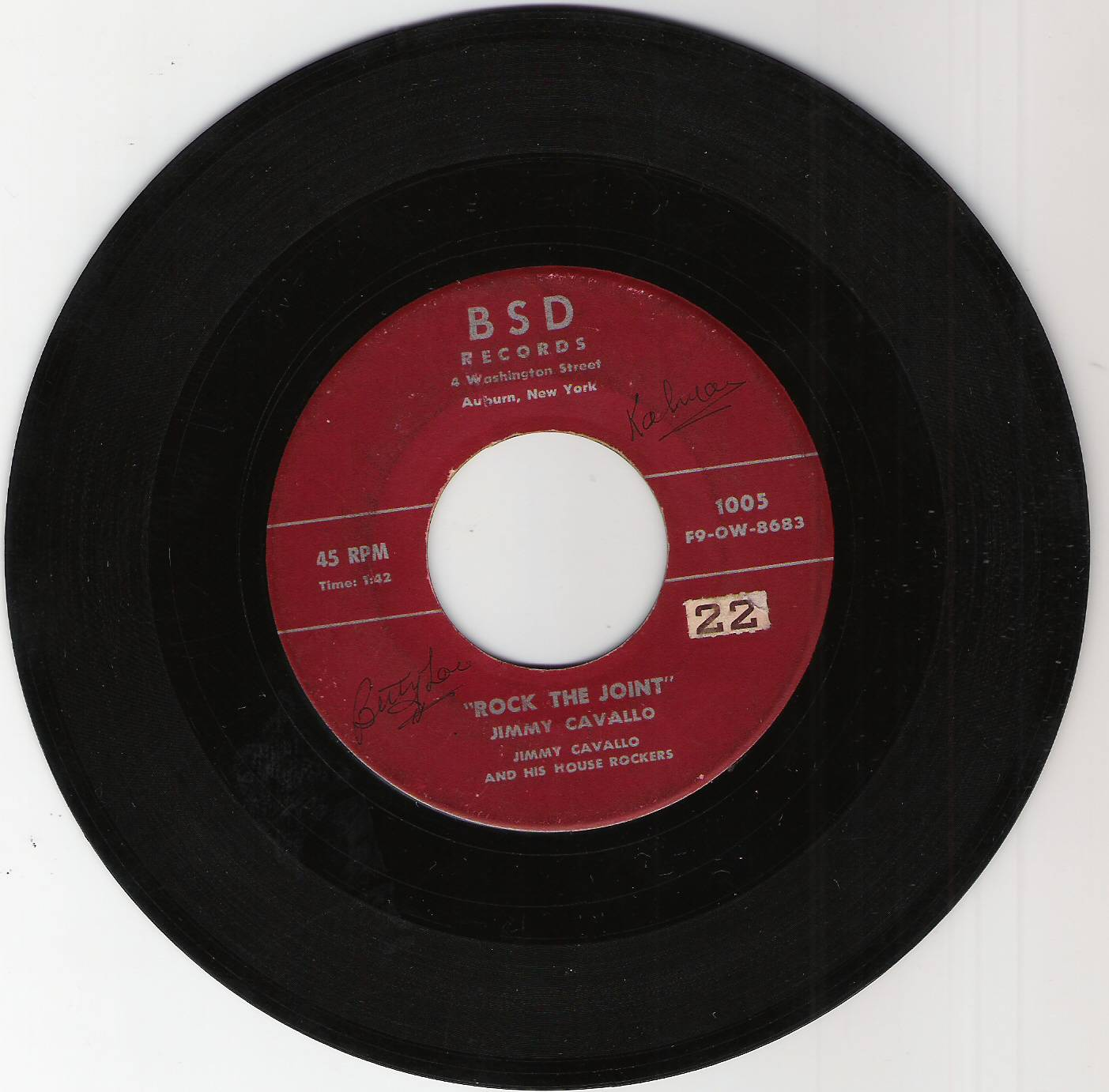
The 1951 Jimmy Cavallo version of "Rock The Joint", originally recorded by Jimmy Preston in 1949.

== Alan Freed and Rock, Rock, Rock ==
In August 1956, Cavallo and his band performed at the Brooklyn Paramount Theater alongside Fats Domino and Big Joe Turner. They subsequently appeared in Alan Freed's movie Rock, Rock, Rock, performing the title track and "The Big Beat." Following the film's release in December 1956, the group performed at the Apollo Theater in Harlem to promote the film, accompanied by a big band composed of former members of the Duke Ellington and Count Basie orchestras led by Sam "The Man" Taylor.

During the summer of 1957, the band held a residency at Harry Roeshe's Beachcomber in Wildwood, New Jersey. They later appeared in Freed's 1959 film Go, Johnny, Go!. Cavallo subsequently recorded tracks for Coral Records, Sunnyside, Hand, Darcy, and Romar.

== Continuing to perform and record ==
In his later years, Cavallo resided in Florida while continuing to make annual summer performance appearances in Syracuse. He held regular musical residencies at venues in South Florida, including P.G. Doogie's in Deerfield Beach and the Saba Asian Restaurant & Lounge in Boca Raton.

Cavallo performed in the United Kingdom on November 22, 2002, at the Rhythm Riot festival in Rye, England. He also performed weekly at Timpano Chophouse in Fort Lauderdale from 2006 to 2013, and remained an active performer at Blue Jeans Blues in Fort Lauderdale through early 2019.

His recording catalog includes several albums released on PetCap Music, including Jimmy Cavallo Live at The Persian Terrace, Live At Freddy's (2003), and Jimmy Cavallo and the Houserockers, Then and Now (2006). In 2002, he released The Houserocker on Blue Wave Records, along with a retrospective compilation featuring his recorded output from 1951 to 1973.

Cavallo died of heart failure in Florida on December 2, 2019, at the age of 92.
