= Bárbara Elorrieta =

Spanish actress and TV producer

Bárbara Elorrieta (Madrid, 5 May 1985) is a Spanish actress and TV producer. Both her grandfather José María Elorrieta and father Javier Elorrieta are film directors.

== Filmography ==
- 2006 Rojo intenso
- 2004 Rottweiler
- 2003 Teresa Teresa
- 2003 Pacto de brujas
- 2003 Beyond Re-Animator
- 2002 Welcome 2 Ibiza

=== Short films ===
- 2002 La Araña negra
- 2002 Tiempos mejores
- 2000 La muerte de Sardanápalo
- 2000 Enrique y Ana
- 2000 El Cinéfilo
- 1999 La Cartera
- 1999 Drama
- 1999 El apagón
- 1999 Es fácil
- 1999 Un beso de mentira

== Television ==
=== As a producer ===
- Intereconomía TV (2008–2009)

=== As an actress ===
- 2005/06 Negocis de família
- 2004 Diez en Ibiza
- 2002-2003 20 tantos
- 2002 Cuéntame cómo pasó
- 2000-2003 en Paraíso
- 1998 La casa de los líos
