= Scream Bloody Murder =

- Film poster
- Directed by: Marc B. Ray
- Screenplay by: Marc B. Ray; Larry Alexander
- Produced by: Marc B. Ray
- Starring: Fred Holbert; Leigh Mitchell
- Cinematography: Stephen H. Burum
- Edited by: Alex Funke
- Music by: Rockwell
- Production companies: First American Films; University Film Company; Alan Roberts Productions
- Distributed by: Indepix Releasing
- Release date: February 1973 (United States)
- Running time: 86 minutes
- Country: United States
- Language: English
- Budget: $80,000

Scream Bloody Murder (also known as Matthew, Claw of Terror and The Captive Female) is a 1973 American slasher film written, directed, and produced by Marc B. Ray, and co-written by Larry Alexander.

== Plot ==
As his father works on a tractor, young Matthew turns it on and kills him with it, damaging his own left hand in the process. Matthew is subsequently placed in a psychiatric hospital, and his mangled limb is replaced with a hook. At the age of eighteen, Matthew is released from the asylum, and returns home, discovering that in his absence his mother has married a neighbor named Mack Parsons. Matthew, who harbors incestuous feelings for his mother despite his aversion to sex, dislikes Parsons, and one night he murders him with an axe. Matthew's mother discovers what her son has done, and when an argument breaks out between them, Matthew knocks her to the ground, and she dies due to hitting her head on a rock.

In the morning, a distraught Matthew hitches a ride with a young couple, whom he also kills, beating in the man's head with a rock and drowning the woman in a roadside stream. Matthew eventually reaches a town, where he makes the acquaintance of a painter and prostitute named Vera, who reminds Matthew of his mother. Matthew becomes obsessed with Vera, to the point of slitting the throat of one of her clients, a drunken sailor, in a jealous rage. Wanting to impress Vera and give her a better life, Matthew bluffs his way into a mansion, where he smothers the owner with a pillow, hacks the maid to death with a cleaver, and beheads the pet dog.

Matthew brings Vera to the mansion, but when she continually refuses his offers to live with him, he grows enraged, and takes her prisoner. Matthew tries to make Vera accept her new life, but she defies him at every turn, even after he bludgeons a doctor (who dropped by to see the house's owner) in front of her. One day, while trying to convince Matthew that she needs a bath, Vera realizes that he is disgusted and disturbed by sexuality, and she uses this to her advantage. Vera intimidates Matthew into trying to have sex with her, and while he is distracted, she stabs him with a loose door hook and tries to escape, but Matthew catches her and rips her throat out with his hook.

With Vera dead, Matthew becomes completely unhinged and runs through town, chased by hallucinations of his victims. Matthew breaks into a church, and as the phantoms surround him, he uses his hook to kill himself.

== Cast ==
- Fred Holbert as Matthew
- Leigh Mitchell as Vera/Daisy Parsons
- Robert Knox as Mack Parsons
- Ron Bastone as sailor
- Suzette Hamilton as Brenda
- Willey Reynolds as Lex
- A. Maana Tanelah as Bridey-Lee
- Florence Lea as Helen Anatole
- Rory Guy as Doctor Epstein
- Cecil Reddick as Mr. Simpson
- Gloria Earl as Blanche Simpson
- J.M. Jones as Young Matthew
- Norman as candy seller
- Rob Max as Matthew's father

== Reception ==
AllMovie gave the film a positive review, writing "Scream Bloody Murder more than lives up to its garish title and tagline with wall-to-wall insanity" and noting that "the film revels in going several steps too far whenever possible". A grade of 2½ out of 5 was given by Hysteria Lives!, which said "It may drag, but for what Scream Bloody Murder lacks in genuine thrills it makes up for with the kind of unpredictability you only seem to get with low-budget 70s horror, where it always feels that anything might happen". The film was called "tedious" by DVD Talk, which went on to write, "I don't even know where to begin on this one... The acting, the writing, the direction -- I mean, this thing's just all kinds of terrible".

== See also ==
- List of American films of 1973
