= Rock, Rock, Rock! =

1956 film directed by Will Price

- One-sheet for the film
- Directed by: Will Price
- Written by: Phyllis Coe; Milton Subotsky
- Produced by: Max Rosenberg; Milton Subotsky
- Starring: Tuesday Weld; Chuck Berry; Fran Manfred; Alan Freed; Teddy Randazzo
- Music by: Milton Subotsky; Frank Virtue; Ray Ellis
- Production company: Vanguard Productions
- Distributed by: Distributors Corporation of America
- Release date: December 4, 1956
- Running time: 85 minutes
- Country: United States
- Language: English
- Budget: $75,000 plus $25,000 in deferments

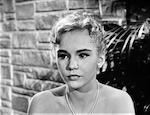
Tuesday Weld portrayed Dori Graham in Rock, Rock, Rock!

Rock, Rock, Rock! is a 1956 musical drama film conceived, co-written and co-produced by Milton Subotsky and directed by Will Price. The film is an early jukebox musical featuring performances by established rock and roll singers of the era, including Chuck Berry, LaVern Baker, Teddy Randazzo, the Moonglows, the Flamingos, and the Teenagers with Frankie Lymon as lead singer. Later West Side Story cast member David Winters is also featured. Famed disc jockey Alan Freed made an appearance as himself.

Valerie Harper made her debut in a brief appearance as an extra seated at the center table during the performance of "Ever Since I Can Remember" by Cirino and the Bowties and can be seen after the performance of Frankie Lymon & the Teenagers. This was also Frankie Lymon & the Teenagers' film debut.

Almost every member of the cast was signed to a record label at the time, which was credited along with each star. In 1984, the film entered the public domain in the United States because the claimants did not renew its copyright registration in the 28th year after publication. The film's numerous musical numbers may have been copyrighted separately, however.

== Plot ==
Dori discusses with her friend Arabella that they are planning to attend the school prom. She is in love with an ambitious singer Tommy Rogers, but she rejects his offer to enter a talent contest sponsored by Alan Freed. However, when she sees a new student Gloria Barker who arrives and announces that she will be wearing a strapless evening gown in blue, Dori becomes disappointed. Dori then persuades her father to give her money so she can afford a dress. However, unbeknownst to Dori, her father closes their charge accounts due to his disapproval of the allowance she has spent.

When she and Arabella are watching Freed's television show featuring upcoming rock and roll performers that night, Dori is worried that Tommy is attracted by Gloria, especially his newfound fame shortly after he has won the talent contest. Dori attempts to buy a strapless evening dress at Miss Silky's shop, but realizes that the charge account has been already closed. Dori then tries to persuade her father to buy her the new thirty-dollar dress; as long as she earns the rest, Dori's father agrees to give her fifteen dollars. Dori then decides to become a banker and borrows fifteen dollars from Arabella for a primary deposit after asking Mr. Bimble for a loan and providing collateral as a requirement–based on the principles of banking. Mistakenly believing that one percent interest on a dollar equals a dollar, Dori realizes that Gloria is attempting to ruin her by buying more expensive dresses and borrowing all fifteen dollars. On the other hand, Gloria tells Tommy that she is being taken advantage of by Dori after the former pledges her newest dress as collateral. Then Gloria exposes Dori's accounting error after refusing immediate repayment. Already upset, Dori encounters Tommy who cancels their date for the prom after hearing Gloria's warning about the former.

Dori asks her father's advice about loans in a coyly manner, and he suggests that bankers can foreclose and take ownership of collateral. As she is on her way to Miss Silky's shop in order to claim ownership, Dori realizes that both the former's and Gloria's fathers are involved, and gets in trouble with Gloria after their schemes are exposed. Dori however convinces both her and Gloria's father that if her father pays Barker thirty dollars for more expensive dress, the former will then have the dress and use the refund to pay Arabella, resulting in Dori getting Gloria's blue dress for the prom.

Meanwhile, Dori attends prom with another boy. Tommy, on the other hand, has arranged for Freed to bring his show to the prom. After several performances by various rock and roll artists, Dori and Tommy reconcile and reunite on the dance floor after the latter's apology.

== Cast ==
- Alan Freed – himself
- Fran Manfred – Arabella
- Tuesday Weld – Dori Graham
- Connie Francis – Dori's singing voice
- Teddy Randazzo – Tommy Rogers
- Jacqueline Kerr – Gloria Barker
- Jack Collins – Mr. Graham, Dori's father
- Carol Moss – Mrs. Graham, Dori's mother
- Eleanor Swayne – Miss Silky
- Lester Mack – Mr. Bimble
- Bert Conway – Mr. Barker
- "Big" Al Sears - himself
- Johnny Burnette – himself
- David Winters – Melville

== Featured songs ==
Rock, Rock, Rock

- "Rock, Rock, Rock" – Jimmy Cavallo & His House Rockers
- "I Never Had A Sweetheart" – Connie Francis
- "The Things Your Heart Needs" – Teddy Randazzo
- "Rock, Pretty Baby" – Ivy Schulman and the Bowties
- "Rock & Roll Boogie" – Alan Freed & His Rock & Roll Band w/"Big" Al Sears (saxophone)
- "I Knew From The Start" – The Moonglows
- "You Can't Catch Me" – Chuck Berry
- "Would I Be Crying" – The Flamingos
- "The Big Beat" – Jimmy Cavallo & His House Rockers
- "Thanks To You" – Teddy Randazzo (announced as Tommy Rodgers)
- "We're Gonna Rock Tonight" – The Three Chuckles With Teddy Randazzo
- "Little Blue Wren" – Connie Francis
- "Rock, Rock, Rock" – Jimmy Cavallo & His House Rockers
- "Lonesome Train (On A Lonesome Track)" – Johnny Burnette Trio
- "Over and Over Again" – The Moonglows
- "Tra La La" – LaVern Baker
- "Ever Since I Can Remember" – Cirino & the Bowties
- "Baby Baby" – Frankie Lymon & the Teenagers
- "I'm Not a Juvenile Delinquent" – Frankie Lymon and The Teenagers
- "Won't You Give Me A Chance" – Teddy Randazzo
- "Right Now, Right Now" – Alan Freed & His Rock & Roll Band with "Big" Al Sears (saxophone)

== Soundtrack ==
The soundtrack album, also titled Rock, Rock, Rock!, was released in December 1956 by Chess Records, labeled LP 1425. The soundtrack compilation featured four songs each from only three artists, Chuck Berry, The Moonglows, and The Flamingos. Only four songs on the album ("Over and Over Again", "I Knew From the Stars", "You Can't Catch Me", and "Would I Be Crying") actually appear in the film. Rock, Rock, Rock! is regarded as the first rock and roll movie to have had a soundtrack album issued.

The Connie Francis songs "I Never Had a Sweetheart" and "Little Blue Wren" appeared in the film and were also released by MGM Records in 1956 as a Connie Francis single. "Baby, Baby" and "I'm Not a Juvenile Delinquent" by The Teenagers also appeared in the film and were subsequently released as a single by Gee Records.

== Production ==
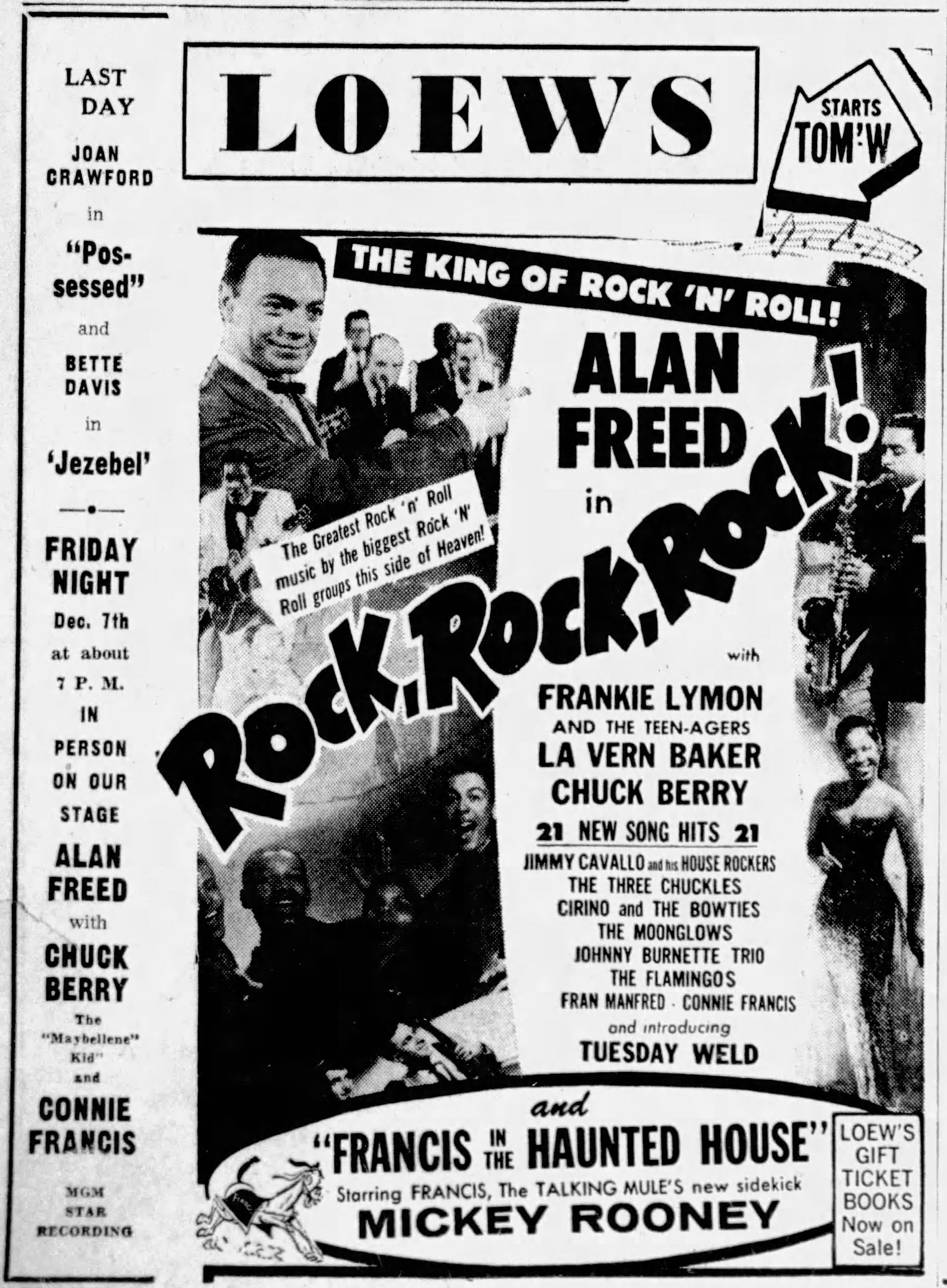
Theatrical advertisement from 1956

This was the first feature film collaboration between Milton Subotsky and Max Rosenberg. On August 13, 1956, the movie began filming in Mikaro Studios, near botanical gardens in Bedford Park, Bronx, and was shot over a period of two weeks. The then-17 year old Francis apparently auditioned for the role of Dori, but the part was instead given to the then-13 year old child model Weld, who was making her first big-screen appearance. Francis provided all of the singing vocals for the Dori character.

== Critical reception ==
A contemporary review of the film in Variety reported that it features "a mostly unimpressive array of rock and roll talent," that it has a "mediocre plot script," "poor production quality," and that the "sound recording is unusually bad, many of the numbers being completely out of sync with the actor action." A review of the film for Turner Classic Movies noted that it is "Freed's film all the way," that it "haphazardly combines songs integrated into the slight storyline with dynamic onstage performances," and that "the acts perform as guests on Freed's television and stage shows, and the veteran emcee introduces them quickly and efficiently."

The film was a success at the box office.

== See also ==
- List of American films of 1956

== Bibliography ==
- Warner, Jay (2006). American Singing Groups. Hal Leonard Corporation. ISBN 0634099787.

== Sources ==
- Rock, Rock, Rock at IMDb
- Dori Anne
