= American International Records =

Record label

American International Records was a record label which was a subsidiary of American International Pictures that was used to release music from their films. It also released recordings from individual artists.

== Background ==
AIP started their own record label, American International Records, in 1959. The manager was Don Leon. That year he announced that Al Simms replaced Jimmy Madden as the head of A&R.

As a division of American International Pictures, it was used to release recorded music soundtracks from the film companies B grade film productions. One such film was Bucktown which featured a score that was written by Johnny Pate, and having the main theme sung by Luther Rabb. The soundtrack was released on American International Records AIR 4477 in 1975.
