= My Perfect Landing =

Canadian television series

- Genre: Sports; Teen drama
- Created by: Frank van Keeken
- Starring: Morgan Wigle; Tom Hulshof; Helena Marie
- Composer: Benjamin Pinkerton
- Country of origin: Canada
- Original language: English
- No. of seasons: 1
- No. of episodes: 15

Production
- Executive producers: Frank van Keeken; Andrew Barnsley; Ben Murray; Yolanda Yott
- Producers: Emma Campbell; Krista Legault; David Lowe; Jeff Somerstein
- Production locations: Toronto, Canada; Miami, U.S.
- Cinematography: Milan Podsedly
- Editor: Jill Lefaive
- Running time: 22–40 minutes
- Production company: Beachwood Canyon Productions

Original release
- Network: Family Channel
- Release: January 8 – April 22, 2020

My Perfect Landing is a Canadian pre-teen drama series. It follows a family of gymnasts through their struggles of dealing with a life-changing move from Miami to Toronto, Canada.

The series was created by Frank van Keeken, the creator of The Next Step and Lost & Found Music Studios, who also co-wrote the opening episode, "Changes", with Lyndon Casey; as well as writing the thirteenth and fifteenth installments, titled "Ready for Battle" and "Hillside - Part Two" respectively. The series premiered on Family Channel on January 8, 2020, airing 15 episodes through April 22, 2020. It aired on CBBC in the United Kingdom, and was released internationally on Netflix on August 1, 2020.

The last episode of My Perfect Landing, "Hillside – Part Two", ended on a cliffhanger, which was to have led into an already planned second season. This was never produced, as TV production across Canada was unexpectedly shut down due to COVID-19; leaving the ending unresolved.

== Cast ==
- Morgan Wigle as Jenny Cortez
- Tom Hulshof as Joon Cortez
- Helena Marie as Whitney Cortez
- Shawn Thompson as Gus McIlroy
- Natasha Zaborski as Olivia Shaw
- Hailey Vynychenko as Sarah Cortez
- Ajanae Stephenson as Keisha Armstrong
- Francesca van Keeken as Rachel Osbourne
- Holly Belbeck as Cassie LaVoisier
- Leonidas Castrounis as Kiko LaVoisier
- Keira Still as Josephine "Bops" Percival
- Luca Assad as Lena Montgomery
- Abby Stretch as Tori Bannister
- Osias Reid as Dace Deloreon
- Azeem Nathoo as Mo
- Jordan Clark as Miss Allister
- Frank van Keeken as Bus driver
- Nicholas Maiorano as Hillside employee
- Anna Beauchamp as Dancer 1

== Episodes ==
No.	Title	Directed by	Written by	Original release date
1	"Changes"	Frank van Keeken and Sherry White	Frank van Keeken and Lyndon Casey	January 8, 2020
2	"Jenny Makes the Team"	Sherry White	Lyndon Casey	January 15, 2020
3	"Opening Day"	Kareen Mallon	Cheryl Meyer and Kara Harun	January 22, 2020
4	"A Day at Cortez"	Annie Bradley	Emma Campbell	January 29, 2020
5	"Best Laid Plans"	Melissa McLean	Ian Malone	February 5, 2020
6	"Head-to-Head"	Patrick Sisam	Conor Casey	February 12, 2020
7	"The Qualifier"	Jim Allodi	Emma Campbell	February 19, 2020
8	"Sleepover"	Steve Bedernjak	Lyndon Casey	February 26, 2020
9	"Uninvited Guests"	Frank van Keeken	Cheryl Meyer and Kara Harun	March 4, 2020
10	"Training Day"	Frank van Keeken	Nelu Handa	March 11, 2020
11	"Sarah's Bet"	Reem Morsi	Reem Morsi	March 18, 2020
12	"Family Feud"	Elizabeth Becker	Conor Casey	March 25, 2020
13	"Ready for Battle"	Frank van Keeken	Frank van Keeken	April 1, 2020
14	"Hillside – Part One"	Jim Allodi	Ian Malone	April 8, 2020
15	"Hillside – Part Two"	Jim Allodi	Frank van Keeken	April 22, 2020
