= Lost and Found on a South Sea Island =

1923 film by Raoul Walsh

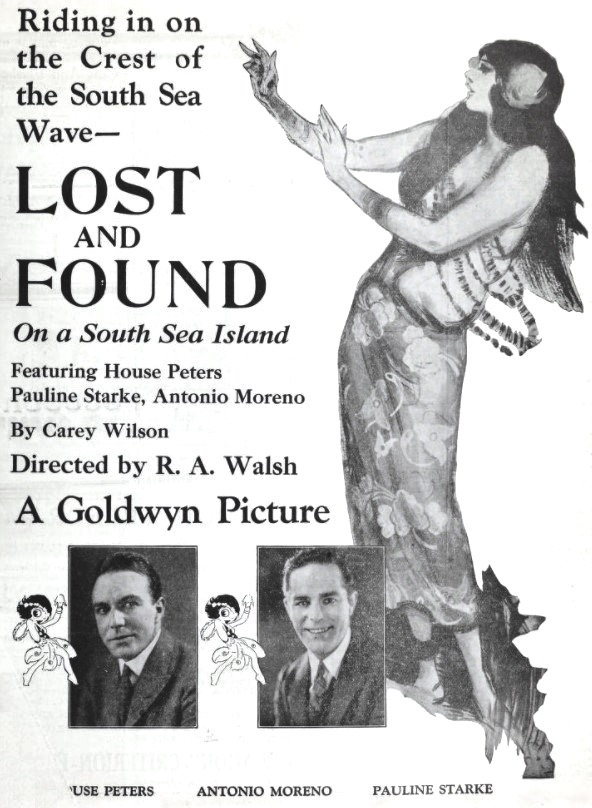
- Trade advertisement
- Directed by: Raoul Walsh
- Written by: Paul Bern
- Produced by: Samuel Goldwyn
- Starring: House Peters; Pauline Starke
- Cinematography: Clyde De Vinna
- Distributed by: Goldwyn Pictures
- Release date: February 23, 1923
- Running time: 70 minutes
- Country: United States
- Language: Silent (English intertitles)

Lost and Found on a South Sea Island is a 1923 American drama film directed by Raoul Walsh and produced by Samuel Goldwyn. It was filmed on location in Tahiti and includes a nude scene involving a young woman bathing.

== Plot ==
Captain Blackbird meets the beautiful Lorna on the island of Pago Pago. However, Lorna is promised to the evil Chief Waki. She and her lover Lloyd Warren beg the captain for help, but he refuses.

== Cast ==
- House Peters as Captain Blackbird
- Pauline Starke as Lorna
- Antonio Moreno as Lloyd Warren
- Mary Jane Irving as Baby Madge
- Rosemary Theby as Madge
- George Siegmann as Faulke
- William V. Mong as Skinner
- Carl Harbaugh as Waki
- William Haines as Extra

== Preservation ==
One reel survives, according to a recent biography of Walsh. However, the Italian archive Cineteca Del Friuli, in Gemona, is said to have a full print.

== See also ==
- List of rediscovered film footage
