= Ann-Margret: From Hollywood With Love =

- Created by: David Winters
- Directed by: David Winters
- Starring: Ann-Margret; Dean Martin; Lucille Ball; The Watts 103rd Street Rhythm Band
- Country of origin: United States
- Original language: English

Production
- Producer: David Winters
- Production company: Winters/Rosen Productions

Original release
- Network: CBS
- Release: December 6, 1969

Ann-Margret: From Hollywood with Love is a 1969 musical variety television special produced, directed and choreographed by David Winters and starring Ann-Margret. Appearing in the special are Dean Martin, Lucille Ball, The Watts 103rd Street Rhythm Band, Larry Storch, among others.

== Synopsis ==
Within the 60 minutes of the special, Ann-Margret, through a variety of sketches and dance routines, makes a tribute to those becoming stars in Hollywood.

== Production ==
The special was made by Winters-Rosen production. It was produced, directed and choreographed by David Winters and stars Ann-Margret. Guests and cameos include Dean Martin, Lucille Ball, The Watts 103rd Street Rhythm Band, Lonney Lewis, Ben Wrigley, Benny Baker, and Larry Storch.

Ann-Margret explained that the reasoning being the title was that "it's popular these days to knock down Hollywood, our special takes a look at the bright side of things."

== Reception ==
In his review written in The Peninsula Times Tribune, Rick Du Brow praised the special. He liked the dance numbers, and took notice of David Winters's talent by saying "the always-exuberant staging of David Winters, whose touch and style are by now distinctive. He also enjoyed the appearance of Dean Martin and Lucille Ball. Of Ann-Margret, he said the "she had the intrinsic warmth and humor, but the final breakthrough to testify to this on television has to be a definitive act of her own will: to risk herself by betting on herself. It's a good bet."

Jerry Coffey of the Fort Worth Star-Telegram, found it uneven saying that the musical number were too stretched out. He said that "David Winters had pizzazz and polish enough to hold one's attention." He found the segment with Lucille Ball, Dean Martin and the dance number "cleverly conceived."

In The Daily Mail, Cynthia Lowry, who liked her previous special The Ann-Margret Show (1968), felt this instalment was not on the same level and that its biggest flaw was that they tried to hard to top it. She did not like the sketches with Dean Martin, but she thought the shot on location segments were the highlights.

Dwight Newton of the San Francisco Examiner thought it was over produced but overall a "lively, swinging hour." He said that.the strongest moments were the comical segments with Dean Martin and Lucille Ball.

Bettelou Peterson, in her review published in the Detroit Free Press, only criticism was that the dance number "Game of Hollywood" was a little long and that the segment with Dean Martin never reached its full potential. She highlighted the energy of the dance number "Autograph Ann and Celebrity Lu", with Lucille Ball. Her overall consensus was that it is "a flowing, well integrated piece of entertainment. David Winters who did the staging is never bound by the usual. His productions burst with motion, color and freedom."

== Accolades ==
- Nominee – Primetime Emmy – Outstanding Achievement in Choreography – David Winters
