= Welcome 2 Ibiza =

- Directed by: David Winters
- Written by: Sean Casey; James Shanks
- Produced by: Andre Bachtiari; Marco Derhy; David Winters
- Starring: Mariano Alameda; Mackenzie Astin; Gary Busey; Athena Cansino
- Cinematography: James Shanks
- Edited by: William Watts
- Music by: Richard Archer
- Distributed by: Alpha Beta Films International
- Release date: February 2003 (Spain)
- Running time: 95 min
- Country: United States
- Language: English

Welcome 2 Ibiza is a 2002 American action comedy film directed by David Winters and starring Mariano Alameda, Mackenzie Astin, Gary Busey, and Athena Cansino. The screenplay concerns a young American girl who inherits a rundown bar and then gets involved in a hostage rescue drama. The film was shot on location on the Spanish island of Ibiza. The film was released in Spain and Thailand.

== Plot ==
Lauren (Athena Cansino), a young woman from America, learns that her Uncle Sam (director David Winters) has been missing at sea, and that as a result she inherits his beach bar on the Mediterranean island of Ibiza. When she arrives, she meets Angelito, a young handsome artist. They go to the bar, only to find it in terrible shape.

Depressed, Lauren returns to town where she meets two more Americans, (Beth and Marilyn) and Crazy Larry. Beth was currently working in a bar, and Marilyn, is a passionate young dancer who was fired after an altercation with a group of drunk buffoons. Crazy Larry, a wacky British DJ was also recently fired for accidentally throwing up on his boss.

Together, the four decide to renovate the bar and get the business running again. Meanwhile, Beth's ex, Nick, has come from the United States to try to get back together with her. They later discover that Angelito's father is being held captive by Cortez, a local gangster (Busey).

== Behind the scenes ==
The island of Ibiza had an casting call for extras in the film. This was shot after the tourist season, so casting was entirely locals and expatriates.

== Cast ==
Actor	Character
Mariano Alameda	Angelito
Mackenzie Astin	Nick
Gary Busey	Cortez
Athena Cansino	Lauren
Bárbara Elorrieta	Hippie
Antonio Cantos	Drag Margarita
Megan Gray	Marilyn
Sami Reed	Barbara
G.W. Stevens	Crazy Larry
Mark Underwood	Hippy / Mime
Winters, David	Uncle Sam

== Release dates ==
Welcome 2 Ibiza was released in Spain and in Thailand in 2003.

== Awards ==
- Audience Award - Best Picture 2002 Bangkok International Film Festival

== See also ==
- Ibiza island 38.98°N 1.43°E
