= The Last Horror Film =

1982 film by David Winters

- Theatrical release poster
- Directed by: David Winters
- Written by: Judd Hamilton; Tom Klassen; David Winters
- Produced by: Judd Hamilton; David Winters
- Starring: Caroline Munro; Joe Spinell; Judd Hamilton; Filomena Spagnuolo
- Cinematography: Thomas F. Denove
- Edited by: Chris Barnes; M. Edward Salier
- Music by: Jeff Koz; Jesse Frederick
- Release date: October 9, 1982 (Sitges Film Festival)
- Running time: 87 minutes
- Country: United States
- Language: English
- Budget: $2 million

The Last Horror Film (also released as Fanatic) is a 1982 American horror comedy film produced by Judd Hamilton directed by David Winters and starring Joe Spinell and Caroline Munro. Its plot follows a delusional middle-aged New York City taxi driver who, fixated on the idea of being a film director, visits the Cannes Film Festival where he begins stalking an actress he is obsessed with.

The film was shot on location at the Cannes Film Festival in France, initially without permits while during filming a permit was provided by the Cannes city council, reuniting actors Spinell and Munro, who had previously starred together in Maniac (1980).

Upon its initial release, it won and was nominated in several film festivals dedicated to genre films. It was considered a partially lost film due to the fact that portions of its gore were excised from the original 35 mm film negatives, and largely only available on some home video editions. In 2023, a complete print of the original cut was found at the La Cinémathèque Française, and utilized by Severin Films for a 4K Ultra HD Blu-ray release.

The Last Horror Film was praised for its blend of self-reflexive horror, humor, and avant-garde approach, using the Cannes Film Festival as a backdrop for a slasher plot that reflects on the film industry. Joe Spinell's performance was widely praised, with critics regarding it as a standout in his career and the film a cult classic of the genre.

== Plot ==
Vinny Durand, a New York City taxi driver who lives with his mother, dreams of directing a film starring horror film actress Jana Bates. He decides to attend the Cannes Film Festival, where she has been nominated for Best Actress her latest horror film Scream, as he hopes to meet her and get her to star in his film to kickstart his directing career.

Accompanying Jana at Cannes is her manager and ex-husband Bret Bates, as well as her boyfriend Alan Cunningham, who has produced the film. Durand tries to meet Jana, but is turned away, only to find out agented scripts are accepted. Shortly afterwards, Jana and Cunningham attend a press conference, where she receives a note saying, "You've made your last horror film. Goodbye." She goes to see Bret at his hotel room after and finds his decapitated corpse. When she later returns with the police, the body is gone.

In the meantime, Durand stalks Jana, covertly filming her with his camera. Marty Bernstein, Jana's agent, runs into Durand and shrugs him off. Bernstein meets with the Scream's director Stanley Kline, and his personal assistant Susan Archer, who reveal that all of them have received the same notes that Jana received. When the police are informed, they believe that Bret's disappearance is a publicity stunt. The next day, Bernstein gets a letter signed from Bret to meet him in a theater screening room. Bernstein is murdered by a cloaked figure upon arrival.

While Jana attends further press conferences, Durand visits a nightclub where he attacks a stripper after envisioning her as Jana. Later, he watches a horror film by Stanley Kline, which he finds disgusting. Later, when Durand runs into Kline outside, he yells at him telling him he should not make nasty films. The following day, the newscast announces the discovery of Bret's body. Archer tells Kline that she wants to leave, but he convinces her to stay. That evening, both of them are killed by an assailant who films their deaths.

Later that night, while Jana is showering in her hotel room, Durand sneaks in with a bottle of champagne, hoping to charm her into starring in his film. A terrified Jana orders him to leave, causing Durand to break the champagne bottle in anger and threaten her with the jagged glass. A bellboy arrives and interrupts the encounter, after which Jana flees through the hotel lobby, which guests mistake for another publicity stunt. Durand, caught off guard, stops and smiles for the onlookers, allowing Jana to escape in a car with Cunningham.

The next day, Cunningham drives Jana to a remote château in the French countryside where his friend Jonathan is staying. Durand follows them. That evening, he sneaks into the château, to be chased away by Jana's bodyguards who shoot pistols in the dark to accidentally kill Jonathan instead without realizing it.

Cunningham and Jana return to Cannes for the awards ceremony and when left alone she is subdued by Durand who takes her back to the castle to film a scene where Durand plays Dracula and Jana the victim. Suddenly, Bret shows up with another camera and a pistol, and congratulates Durand on setting everything up for him. Bret, revealed to be the killer and the mastermind behind this, says that on the day when Durand phoned him about his film proposal, he realized that he was the perfect fall guy to set up to get even with Jana for leaving him. Durand throws his cape over Bret and runs away.

Bret grabs Jana and follows Durand outside. Bret taunts him to come out. Durand turns on a motorcycle's headlights, blinding Bret, and as Jana steps aside, He grabs a chainsaw and murders Bret with it. Cunningham arrives with the police, to see Durand standing before Bret's dead body and screams.

The image falls back to reveal that the whole story is a film that Vinny filmed at the Cannes Film Festival with Jana Bates, and he is now back in New York showing it to his mother in a screening room.

== Cast ==
- Caroline Munro as Jana Bates
- Joe Spinell as Vinny Durand
- Judd Hamilton as Alan Cunningham
- Devin Goldenberg as Marty Bernstein
- David Winters as Stanley Kline
- Susanne Benton (credited as Stanley Susanne Benson) as Susan Archer
- Filomena Spagnuolo (credited as Mary Spinell) as Vinny's Mother
- Glenn Jacobson as Bret Bates
- Kris Kristofferson as Himself (uncredited)

== Release and partially lost film to restoration ==
The completed film was first shown on October 9, 1982 at the Sitges Film Festival in Barcelona, Spain. It played in film festivals, where it won and received several nominations.

The film was released theatrically in the United States, with Fanatic as its title, in July 1983. The film did not have a wide theatrical and was released on VHS.

After its initial release much the film's gore was excised from the original negative, appearing mainly on VHS prints that chose to retain it. This made it a partially lost film.

In May 2009, Troma Entertainment released it on DVD, patching back these scenes from a separate VHS source. For their 2015 Blu-ray release, heavy damage was noticed on the source they used.

In 2023, distributor Severin Films used this print for a 4K Ultra HD Blu-ray release with the film fully restored with rediscovered film footage. Prior to this, Rue Morgue magazine expressed interested in the director's original vision and gave themselves the mission to restore it. They went on to ask various archivists and collectors to help with the research. Eventually, author Guillaume Le Disez located a 35 mm print of the original cut at La Cinémathèque Française in excellent condition.

== Critical response ==
Anton Bitel of Little White Lies found it witty and mesmerizing. He noted the avant-garde of the film saying the "genre film shot on location during the actual 1981 Cannes festival, The Last Horror Film exploits the realities of cinema’s biggest dream market, while weaving into this world of cutthroat deals the kind of slasher plot that can only happen in the movies. As such, this is horror of a decidedly self-reflexive stamp, made two decades before Brian De Palma's Femme Fatale would again use Cannes as the backdrop to all manner of postmodern play in the world of genre. It was also made over a decade and a half before Wes Craven's Scream took the crown for the supposedly innovative nature of its meta approach to horror – and, whether by coincidence or not, the film-within-a-film which has just won Jana her award is also called Scream."

Cheryl Eddy of Gizmodo liked the acting by Spinell and his mother. She wrote: "Spinell consumes the scenery with his usual flair — except in the handful of scenes he shares with his character’s mother, played by Spinell’s actual mother, who gives him some serious competition for the spotlight."

Morgan Elektra of Dread Central enjoyed it and liked the acting by its two leads especially Spinell. Of his performance she said "Spinell’s performance is really the lynchpin of the whole film" and "I can’t think of a single frame where he wasn’t completely selling the role". Her overall opinion is that it "is an entertaining flick that most horror fans will enjoy whether it be for the nostalgia."

In his review for DVD Talk, Tyler Foster described the film as ambitious but uneven, aiming for satire and depth but failing to bring its ideas together. He noted that while the story explores the line between obsession and creativity, its execution feels scattered. He felt the film’s ending undermines its strongest themes, leaving it an interesting but flawed. Foster praised Spinell's performance for adding humanity to an otherwise chaotic narrative and highlighted the surreal dream sequences and Cannes setting as standout touches.

Chris Coffel of Bloody Disgusting praised it and said "I really love this movie. I think it’s a ton of fun and shows off a bit more range from Spinell than we typically see. It’s also a nice slasher/mystery with a fairly surprising ending. Not sure it all completely makes sense, but the film does enough job selling it so I’m willing to buy. And then of course there is the guerilla style filmmaking that went into this. The crew just went to Cannes and shot, permits be damned! So the movie is good. I’m a fan."

Upon its 2023 4K Ultra HD Blu-ray release, John Squires also of Bloody Disgusting also liked it and in his article he wrote that it is “an awesome movie and Spinell’s best film.”

== Accolades ==
Institution	Category	Recipient	Result	Ref.
Festival du Film de Paris	Best International Film	The Last Horror Film	Nominated	
Saturn Awards	Best International Film	The Last Horror Film	Nominated	
Saturn Awards	Best Supporting Actress	Filomena Spanguolo	Nominated	
Sitges Film Festival	Best Cinematography	Thomas F. Denove	Won	
Sitges Film Festival	Official selection	The Last Horror Film		
