= Cirino =

Cirino is a surname. Notable people with the surname include:

- Bruno Cirino (1936–1981), Italian actor and stage director
- Danilo Cirino (born 1986), Brazilian footballer
- Jerry Cirino, medical device company executive
- Lenni Cirino (born 2003), Montserratian football player
- Marcelo Cirino (born 1992), Brazilian footballer
- Natale Cirino (1894–1962), Italian stage and film actor
- Paolo Cirino Pomicino (1939–2026), Italian politician
- Raff Cirino (born 2007), footballer
