= Racquet (film) =

1979 comedy film directed by David Winters

- Film Poster
- Directed by: David Winters
- Written by: Steve Michaels & Earle Doud (screenplay); Alan Roberts (uncredited); David Winters (uncredited); Steve Michaels (uncredited) (story)
- Produced by: Alan Roberts; David Winters
- Starring: Bert Convy; Lynda Day George; Edie Adams; Phil Silvers; Bobby Riggs
- Cinematography: Mario DiLeo; Alan Roberts
- Edited by: Gerald Brodsky; Lee Burch; Leo Guerra; Fabien D. Tordjmann
- Music by: Michel Rubini
- Production companies: Cal-Am Productions; Harlequin Productions
- Distributed by: Cal-Am Artists; Creswin Distribution; Cannon/VMP; VCII Home Entertainment
- Release date: June 1979 (United States)
- Running time: 87 minutes
- Country: United States
- Language: English

Racquet is a 1979 American comedy film starring Bert Convy as a tennis player. The picture is notable for featuring real-life tennis champions Bobby Riggs and Björn Borg in acting roles.

It was described as "Shampoo for the tennis set."

It was originally known as Raquets.

== Cast ==
- Bert Convy as Tommy Everett
- Lynda Day George as Monica Gordon
- Edie Adams as Leslie Sargent
- Phil Silvers as Arthur Sargent
- Bobby Riggs as Charlie
- Tanya Roberts as Bambi
- Bruce Kimmel as Arnold
- Dorothy Konrad as Mrs. Kaufman
- Björn Borg as himself
- Susan Tyrell as Miss Baxter
- Judd Hamilton as performer
