= Roogie's Bump =

1954 film by Harold Young

- Theatrical release poster
- Directed by: Harold Young
- Screenplay by: Jack Hanley; Dan Totheroh
- Story by: Joyce Selznick; Frank Warren
- Produced by: John Bash
- Starring: Robert Marriott; Ruth Warrick; Olive Blakeney; Robert F. Simon; William Harrigan; David Winters
- Cinematography: J. Burgi Contner
- Edited by: Paul Davis; David Kummins
- Music by: Lehman Engel
- Production company: Republic Pictures
- Distributed by: Republic Pictures
- Release date: August 25, 1954
- Running time: 71 minutes
- Country: United States
- Language: English

Roogie's Bump is a 1954 American comedy film directed by Harold Young and written by Jack Hanley and Dan Totheroh. The film stars Robert Marriott, Ruth Warrick, Olive Blakeney, Robert F. Simon, William Harrigan and David Winters. The film was released on August 25, 1954, by Republic Pictures. It was remade in 1993 as Rookie of the Year.

== Plot ==
A young boy who loves baseball develops a strange bump on his arm. The bump has such an effect on his pitching arm that he soon finds himself playing for a major league baseball team.

== Cast ==
- Robert Marriott as Remington "Roogie" Rigsby
- Ruth Warrick as Mrs. Rigsby
- Olive Blakeney as Mrs. Andrews
- Robert F. Simon as Boxi
- William Harrigan as Red O'Malley
- David Winters as Andy
- Michael Mann as Benji
- Archie Robbins as P.A. Ryker
- Louise Troy as Kate
- Guy Rennie as Danny Doowinkle
- Tedd Lawrence as Sports Announcer
- Michael Keane as Barney Davis
- Roy Campanella as Himself
- Billy Loes as Himself
- Carl Erskine as Himself
- Russ Meyer as Himself

== Production note ==
The film includes scenes at Ebbets Field, home field of the Brooklyn Dodgers.

== See also ==
- List of baseball films
