= Firehead =

- Directed by: Peter Yuval
- Written by: Jeffrey Mandel; Peter Yuval
- Produced by: David Winters; Peter Yuval
- Starring: Christopher Plummer; Chris Lemmon; Brett Porter; Gretchen Becker; Martin Landau
- Cinematography: Paul Maibaum
- Edited by: Steven Nielson
- Music by: Vladimir Horunzhy
- Production company: Action International Pictures
- Release date: January 25, 1991
- Running time: 88 minutes
- Country: United States
- Language: English

Firehead is a 1991 science fiction–thriller film. It was directed by Peter Yuval for Action International Pictures, and stars Chris Lemmon and Christopher Plummer. It was filmed in Mobile, Alabama and released theatrically in 1991.

== Plot ==
In 1988, a telekinetic Soviet agent known as "Firehead" (Brett Porter) defects to the west after refusing to use his powers against Estonian protesters. Two years later, he begins blowing up American munitions factories for unknown reasons. An NIH chemist (Chris Lemmon) and a government assassin (Gretchen Becker) are ordered to track him down. Meanwhile, a secret society led by Colonel Vaughn (Christopher Plummer) prepares to use Firehead's activities as a pretext for a coup d'état.

== Reception ==
According to Kevin Thomas of the Los Angeles Times, the film is "as inept and dismal a political thriller as you would never wish to watch", though he praised certain members of the cast, in particular the cameo appearance by Martin Landau.

In 2013, it was the subject of a RiffTrax commentary track featuring Michael J. Nelson, Bill Corbett, and Kevin Murphy. The trio directed much of their mockery toward Chris Lemmon, who was compared unfavorably to his more famous father.
