= Blackbeard (miniseries) =

- DVD cover art
- Genre: Adventure, Drama
- Written by: Bryce Zabel
- Directed by: Kevin Connor
- Starring: Angus Macfadyen; Richard Chamberlain
- Theme music composer: Elia Cmiral
- Country of origin: United States
- Original language: English

Production
- Producers: H. Daniel Gross; Robert Halmi; Larry Levinson
- Cinematography: Alan Caso
- Running time: 169 minutes (DVD version)
- Production companies: Larry Levinson Productions; Hallmark Entertainment

Original release
- Network: Hallmark Channel
- Release: June 17 – June 19, 2006

Blackbeard is a 2006 American adventure-drama television miniseries based on the pirate Blackbeard, directed by Kevin Connor from a screenplay written by Bryce Zabel. It premiered on Hallmark Channel on June 17, 2006. The miniseries was shot on location in Thailand and the town of New Providence was built on a coconut plantation, and includes many factual names and places, but it is essentially a fictional story since Blackbeard's most notable exploits took place in North Carolina.

== Plot ==
In the first quarter of the 18th century, Blackbeard, otherwise known as Edward Teach, was seen as the most notorious and dangerous seafaring pirate of all. Plying his trade around the West Indies and the eastern coast of England’s North American colonies in his ship Queen Anne's Revenge. Blackbeard wreaks havoc whilst looking for Captain Kidd's treasure, and his dark presence causes controversy in the port town of New Providence (The Bahamas), especially for Governor Charles Eden and his adopted daughter Charlotte, who is being wooed by Lieutenant Robert Maynard.

== Cast ==
- Angus Macfadyen as Blackbeard
- Mark Umbers as Lieutenant Robert Maynard
- Richard Chamberlain as Governor Charles Eden
- Jessica Chastain as Charlotte Ormand
- Stacy Keach as Captain Benjamin Hornigold
- Clement von Franckenstein as Admiral Joseph Pennington
- Rachel Ward as Sally Dunbar
- Anthony Green as Israel Hands
- Jasper Britton as William Howard
- Niko Nicotera as Moses Hobbs
- Robin Strasser as Felice Richmond
- Nicholas Farrell as Tobias Knight
- David Winters as Silas Bridges
- Dom Hetrakul as Seng
- Nigel Terry as Calico Billy
- Steven Elder as Lt. Jack Spector
- Paul Brightwell as Captain Ellis Brand
- Andrew Smith as Benjamin Dow
- Love Nystrom as Captain William Kidd
- Stuart Lounton as Cordingly
- Wendy Mae Brown as Lulu
- Jake Curran as Joseph Prescott
- Robert Willox as Snake Leavitt
- Patrick Regis as Thatch
- Alan Shearman as Enoch Sanborn
- Danny Midwinter as Elias Ransom
- Bill Fellows as Dr Peter Bruce
- Christopher Clyde-Green as Black Caesar
- Ken Forge as Phillips
- Marion Valtas as Maddy
- Greg Jorgensen as Panhandler
- Jonathan Samson as Woodward
- James Moody as Two-Face Askin
- David Ismalone as Captain Jean D'Ocier
- Jake Anthony as Minister
- Greg Stefaniuk as Merchant Captain
- Shaun Delaney as John Noble
- James David McClurg as Shiny
- Keith Lounton as Carlton
- Johann Bento as French First Mate
- Thomas Kollon as Big John
- Emma Passos as Mother
- Damian Mavis as First Robber

== Production ==
Despite being a miniseries, the series is largely a remake of Captain Blood (1935). It was filmed by Living Films on location around Seattle, Washington.

== Home media ==
It was released on DVD by Echo Bridge Entertainment on July 11, 2006. It was later released in an international DVD edition re-titled Pirates: The True Story of Blackbeard, though by the writer's own admission little of the screenplay was actually true.
