= Raquel! (TV program) =

TV special (1970)

- Created by: David Winters
- Written by: Doug Tibbles. Larry Alexander, Jonathan Axelrod
- Directed by: David Winters
- Starring: Raquel Welch, Tom Jones, Bob Hope, John Wayne
- Theme music composer: Don Randi
- Country of origin: United States
- Original language: English

Production
- Producer: David Winters
- Editors: Erwin Dumbrille; John A. Martinelli
- Running time: 48 min

Original release
- Network: CBS
- Release: April 26, 1970

Raquel! is a 1970 CBS musical television special starring Raquel Welch, directed and choreographed by David Winters. Appearing in the special are Tom Jones, Bob Hope and John Wayne. The production company was Winters-Rosen for CBS-TV, furthermore it was co-sponsored by Coca-Cola and Motorola.

Raquel! was a grand TV spectacle that combined music, comedy, and iconic pop-culture figures of the era. Filmed across diverse locations like London, Paris, Mexico City, and Los Angeles, the special featured extravagant production numbers, showcasing Raquel Welch's talents alongside musical legend Tom Jones. Bob Mackie's costume designs and global settings added to the visual appeal, creating a memorable and stylish '70s showcase. The guest appearances heightened the star power, while the mix of classic rock 'n' roll standards and dynamic performances made it a standout special of the time.

On the day of the premiere, the show received a 51% share on the National ARB Ratings and an Overnight New York Nielsen Rating of 58% share.

The reviews for Raquel! largely praised the special for its stunning visuals, impressive direction, and captivating performances. Many noted that Raquel Welch truly shined, thanks in part to the talents behind the camera. The use of diverse, global locations and elaborate set pieces added to the spectacle, creating a visually poetic and charming mood. Overall, Raquel! was celebrated as a dazzling TV event that showcased Welch in a way that captured the imagination of its era.

== Production ==
Winters setting up the Mayans

Raquel! was filmed in London, Paris, Acapulco, Mexico City, Yucatan, Big Sur, and Los Angeles and featured lavish production numbers. It marked Welch's debut special on television. Together Welch and Jones combined musical and comedic talents on classic rock 'n' roll standards of the era.

Although Welch sings throughout the show, she briefly recites "The Lady of Shalott", a ballad by the Victorian poet Alfred, Lord Tennyson.

The special, considered by some to be a classic '70s timepiece, unites pop-culture icons in their prime. The multimillion-dollar, TV song & dance extravaganza was filmed around the world - from Paris to Mexico. Lavish production numbers of classic songs from the era, extravagant Bob Mackie -designed costumes and guest performances. Guest stars John Wayne, Tom Jones, and Bob Hope added to the largeness of the production.

== Ratings ==
On the day of the premiere, the show received a 51% share on the National ARB Ratings and an Overnight New York Nielsen Rating of 58% share.

== Reception ==
In Rick Du Brow's review, appearing in The Bremerton Sun, he praises the settings, the photography, and Winters's directing. Du Brow thinks that Welch really shined because of the talents behind the camera, explaining that with David Winters's "imagination and Stephen Burum's photography Miss Welch has never looked better."

In his review published in The Indianapolis News, Richard K. Shull praised the photography, the use of locations, and the directing. While Shull liked it, he didn't care for the segment with Bob Hope. Shull was particularly impressed with Winters managing to cover Welch’s lack of abilities.

Jack Gould of The New York Times said that Raquel! has the potential to become the future of home video content. He called it a "visual fantasy", that would appeal to teenagers and those below the age of 25. He thinks that Welch weakest moment was her Mae West impression, while her strongest was her performance with Tom Jones.

In the Daily News, reviewer Ben Gross said it was charming and that Welch presented a pleasant personality. He praised the scenery and added that the music created "visually poetic mood".

Bryan Thomas in his 2015 retrospective review for Night Flight said it was a jaw dropping time capsule due to the costumes and elaborate set pieces. His overall consensus was that Welch really shined in an awesome special.

== Music listing ==
Fourteen songs from the era are featured, although many are in the form of medley. Welch and friends sang songs by the Beatles, Little Richard, The Mamas & the Papas and many others. The oldest was not much older than five years from original release.

Collapsible Song List
Title!	Performer (s)!	Location
Games People Play	Raquel Welch	Paris
California Dreamin'	Welch	
Everybody's Talkin'	Welch	
Peaceful	Welch	
Raindrops Keep Falling on My Head	Welch	
Here Comes the Sun	Welch	
Good Morning Starshine	Welch	
Aquarius/Let the Sunshine In	Welch	Mexico
I (Who Have Nothing)	Tom Jones	London
The Sounds of Silence	Welch	
Rip It Up (song) / Slippin' n Slidin' / Lucille / Tutti Frutti /Jenny, Jenny / Good Golly Miss Molly / We're Gonna Have Some Fun Tonight	Welch & Jones	
Rocky Raccoon	Welch & Bob Hope	Sun Valley, ID
