= Dancin': It's On! =

Dancin' It's On!
- Theatrical release poster
- Directed by: David Winters
- Written by: David Winters; David A. Prior
- Produced by: David Winters
- Starring: Witney Carson; Chehon Wespi-Tschopp; Gary Daniels; Jordan Clark; Matt Marr; Russell Ferguson; David Winters
- Cinematography: Alan Roberts
- Edited by: Alan Roberts
- Music by: Misha Segal
- Production company: East Side Story
- Distributed by: Medallion Releasing
- Release date: October 30, 2015
- Running time: 89 minutes
- Country: United States
- Language: English
- Budget: $12 million
- Box office: $27,000

Dancin': It's On! is a 2015 American musical romantic comedy film co-written, directed and produced by David Winters in his final film prior to his death in 2019. The cast consists of numerous winners and runner-ups from the dance competition TV show So You Think You Can Dance, led by Witney Carson and Chehon Wespi-Tschopp, with Gary Daniels and Winters.

The film was released on October 30, 2015 by Medallion Releasing, to largely negative reviews from critics and audiences for its acting, screenplay, characters, editing, cinematography, music and dubbing. It has developed a "so bad it's good" cult following.

== Plot ==
Jennifer August, a high school student with a passion for dancing, is sent by her mother to spend her summer vacation with her estranged father Jerry at the luxury hotel he owns. While there, Jerry introduces her to Danny, the head bellboy, but she is immediately attracted to Ken, a dishwasher who is also a skilled dancer. Jennifer sees Ken again in a nightclub, where he informs her about a dance competition that he plans to enter.

The next day, Danny admonishes Ken for associating with Jennifer. Ken is then scolded by Hal Sanders, a short-tempered elderly patron who lives in the hotel, for his poor service and for addressing him as if he is Ken's father. Ken encounters Jennifer again, who gives him a day off and takes him on a trip around the city. Afterwards, Jennifer is forced by her father Jerry to date Danny and stop seeing Ken, which displeases her.

Jennifer is introduced to Shotsy, who is Ken's dance partner in the upcoming dance competition and harbors unrequited affection for him. Danny decides to enter the competition partnered with Jennifer. When Jennifer confesses to Ken about her forced relationship with Danny, Ken is enraged at her. Ken runs into Hal, who reveals that he too can dance.

Jennifer is made to go on a date with Danny. She and Ken accuse one another of unfaithfulness and angrily break up. Jennifer joins a flash mob crowd to emotionally recover, which impresses Danny; this motivates her to accept being Danny's competition partner. Meanwhile, Hal reveals to Ken that he used to be a dancer and choreographer, but quit after his son's death in a war; this is also the reason Hal dislikes being referred to as a father. Ken asks Hal to be his father figure and to coach him and Shotsy for the competition, to which he agrees.

While training Shotsy and Ken, Hal convinces Shotsy to stop pursuing Ken. Elated, Ken reconciles with Jennifer and they kiss. Ken and Jennifer partner instead, with Hal as their coach, while Shotsy partners with Danny. Ken and Jennifer win the competition, while Jennifer's parents cheer the two on together in the audience and Hal finally accepts Ken as his son.

== Cast ==
- Witney Carson as Jennifer Gabriella August
- Chehon Wespi-Tschopp as Ken
- David Winters as Hal Sanders
- Jordan Clark as Shotsy
- Gary Daniels as Jerry August
- Matt Marr as Danny
- Russell Ferguson as the Captain
- Pauline Mata as Pauline
- Ava Fabian as Jennifer's mother
- Brandon Bryant as Brandon
- Tadd Gadduang as Tadd
- Comfort Fedoke as Comfort

== Critical reception ==
Los Angeles Times reviewer Michael Rechtshaffen, gave the film a largely negative review which concluded, "the low-budget production, with its soapy dialogue and cheesy video effects, should have splurged for someone to help choreograph the leads' stiffly executed dramatic exchanges." The Seattle Times reviewer Soren Andersen rated the film one star out of four, criticizing the "simplistic" plot and stiff acting of the lead characters.
