= Lucy in London =

- Written by: Ron Friedman; Pat McCormick
- Directed by: Steve Binder
- Starring: Lucille Ball; Anthony Newley; The Dave Clark Five; Wilfrid Hyde-White
- Music by: Billy Goldenberg; Irwin Kostal; Phil Spector
- Country of origin: United States
- Original language: English

Production
- Producers: Steve Binder, David Winters
- Cinematography: Fouad Said
- Editors: John M. Foley; Bud S. Smith
- Running time: 60 minutes

Original release
- Network: CBS
- Release: October 24, 1966

Lucy in London is a 1966 prime-time TV special produced and directed by Steve Binder, co-produced and choreographed by David Winters and sponsored by the Monsanto Company. The program starred Lucille Ball, Anthony Newley and the Dave Clark Five and was filmed entirely on location in London. It Is also notable in that producer Phil Spector was among the musicians to contribute to the special.

== Plot ==
Lucy Carmichael (Lucille Ball), arrives in London to claim a free day trip that she won in a jingle contest. She is expecting a luxury limousine tour of the city, but instead is greeted by a tour guide named Tony (Anthony Newley) who escorts her in a motorcycle with an open sidecar. Their initial stop, for punting on the River Thames in an inflatable raft, ends disastrously when they collide with a rowing team and sink beneath the waters. Tony then takes Lucy to the heart of London's shopping district, where she models the latest mod fashions in a musical number based on the Phil Spector tune "Lucy in London".

Lucy then joins a tour through Madame Tussaud's wax museum escorted by a guide (Wilfred Hyde White), where she is frightened by a curator (James Robertson Justice) whom she mistakes for a haunted wax statue that comes to life. She then visits a British manor, where she plays Kate opposite actor Peter Wyngarde in a scene from the William Shakespeare comedy The Taming of the Shrew. Lucy and Tony return to the Thames, where they sing Pop Goes the Weasel as a duet. The Dave Clark Five turns up to sing London Bridge is Falling Down.

Lucy and Tony then arrive at an empty theater, where Tony dons a tuxedo and sings a medley of songs from the Leslie Bricusse-Anthony Newley show Stop the World – I Want to Get Off. Lucy follows him with a mime act and a song where she shows her appreciation of her London adventures.

== Production history ==
Lucy in London came about as part of Lucille Ball's 1966-1967 contract renewal with CBS. At the time, she was producing and starring in The Lucy Show for the network. The agreement gave her the option to star in three specials that would be produced independent of her weekly program. Ball originally planned a production where she would co-star with Mitzi Gaynor as two nuns touring Europe, followed by a French-based production called Lucy in Paris and a Middle Eastern comedy called Lucy in Arabia. None of those projects gained footing, and instead Ball, through her company Desilu Productions and ITV franchisee ABC Weekend TV, opted to shoot Lucy in London. Impressed by his work, Ball hired Steve Binder to direct the special.

The concept for Lucy in London was set up in an episode of The Lucy Show called "Lucy Flies to London". Much of that episode, which involved Lucy’s unfamiliarity with air travel, was based on an unsold pilot written and shot in 1960.

However Lucy In London was not explicit in its connection to The Lucy Show. This would accommodate viewers who may not have seen The Lucy Show prior to the standalone special. There is a brief reference Lucy makes in the beginning to her male tourist how she "works at a bank back home" in reference to Lucy Carmichael's job on the show.

Laurence Olivier was signed to appear in Lucy in London, but withdrew from the production prior to shooting.

Ball went through 15 different wigs during the production. Cleo Smith, Ball's cousin and the executive in charge of this production, later recalled that problems arose in photographing the star on the London locations, where the use of heavy stage make-up and filtered lighting that was employed for her studio-based program could not be repeated. Ball's biographer Geoffrey Mark Fidelman would later remark that the actress "looked old" throughout the show due to difficulties in establishing flattering lighting for the outdoor sequences.

Lucy in London was broadcast on October 24, 1966, replacing both The Lucy Show and The Andy Griffith Show for that evening. Viewership was high for the special (finishing as the most-watched telecast of the week) but critical responses were very poor, with Variety complaining: "What had promised to be one of the season's major specials turned out to be a major disappointment." Ball opted not to pursue the creation of the remaining two specials in her contract and severed ties with director Steve Binder. (Ball did co-star in one other special earlier in 1966, Carol + 2, which starred Carol Burnett, had a much better reception and would be re-aired in 1967 to fill one of the spots of the two unproduced specials.)

Additionally, Ball had starred in a special in 1965, The Lucille Ball Comedy Hour with Bob Hope (that is not to be confused with her similarly-titled series of television specials with the cast of her prior show), although that special was not part of the contract that gave way to this production.

Lucy in London is included on the DVD release of The Lucy Show - The Official 5th Season.
