= The Special London Bridge Special =

1972 musical variety TV special

- Created by: David Winters
- Written by: Ronnie Cass; Marty Farrell; Donald Ross; Marc B. Ray
- Directed by: David Winters
- Starring: Tom Jones; Jennifer O'Neill; Kirk Douglas; Engelbert Humperdinck
- Theme music composer: Marvin Hamlisch
- Country of origin: United States
- Original language: English

Production
- Producer: David Winters
- Running time: 48 minutes
- Production company: Winters/Rosen Productions

Original release
- Network: NBC
- Release: May 7, 1972

The Special London Bridge Special is a 1972 musical variety television special produced, directed and choreographed by David Winters and starring Tom Jones and Jennifer O'Neill. Appearing in the special were The Carpenters, Kirk Douglas, Jonathan Winters, Hermione Gingold, Lorne Greene, Chief Dan George, Charlton Heston, George Kirby, Michael Landon, Terry-Thomas, Engelbert Humperdinck, Elliott Gould, Merle Park, and Rudolf Nureyev

It was made to celebrate the acquisition of the London Bridge in Lake Havasu City, Arizona. It was filmed in Lake Havasu following the opening of the London Bridge.

== Synopsis ==
Tom Jones catches a bus in London and is magically transported to Lake Havasu and the newly opened London Bridge. There he meets Jennifer O'Neill and a romance ensues which punctuated by musical and choreography interludes.

== Production ==
The special was made by Winters-Rosen production. It was produced, directed and choreographed by David Winters and it starred Tom Jones and Jennifer O'Neill. Guests and cameos The Carpenters, Kirk Douglas, Jonathan Winters, Hermione Gingold, Lorne Greene, Chief Dan George, Charlton Heston, George Kirby, Michael Landon, Terry-Thomas, Engelbert Humperdinck, Elliott Gould, Merle Park, and Rudolf Nureyev.

About the many celebrities appearances, Winters explained "the reason we got so many big name guest stars is because everybody kind of dug the idea of doing a special with the London Bridge in the desert."

About the mood and tones of the special, Winters said "the show is not a documentary, it's a musical fantasy sort of like 'Alice in Wonderland'. Hermione Gingold plays a Mad Hatter type of character who takes Tom Jones on a search for the missing bridge."

Tom Jones explained that he accepted to do the special because it allowed him to continue doing television without having the confinement of a series.

While the early scene were filmed in London, the special was shot in Lake Havasu City, Arizona. Helping the production was radio KFWJ which offered their services announcement services for free. When the production needed a gran baby piano, double for the leads, a white horse, or extras. The station made announcement and residents volunteered. In a scene where The Carpenters performed an estimated 800 young adults showed up as extras.
