= The Ann-Margret Show =

TV special (1968)

- Created by: David Winters
- Directed by: David Winters
- Starring: Ann-Margret; Bob Hope; Jack Benny; Danny Thomas
- Country of origin: United States
- Original language: English

Production
- Producer: David Winters
- Production company: Winters/Rosen Productions

Original release
- Network: CBS
- Release: December 1, 1968

The Ann-Margret Show is a 1968 musical variety television special produced, directed and choreographed by David Winters and starring Ann-Margret. Appearing in the special are Bob Hope, Jack Benny, and Danny Thomas.

The Ann-Margret Show is a musical special based on her successful live club act, featuring several numbers, including a song sung in her native Swedish. After a long absence from television, Ann-Margret explained that she returned only because she was finally offered material she believed in, as she didn’t want to "cheat the public" with anything less. The outfits for the show, ensured they complemented the scenes and allowed for dance movement. In appreciation for Bob Hope’s participation, she later joined him on his annual tour to entertain troops in the Far East.

The Ann-Margret Show received praise for its vibrant energy, impressive performances, and dynamic visuals. Reviewers appreciated Ann-Margret’s ability to excel in multiple areas, from singing and dancing to comedy. Her routines were described as effective and well-choreographed, showcasing the hard work and dedication she put into the show. The special was hailed as a visual delight, with exciting sets and polished dance numbers. Even her comedic timing was noted as a refreshing and impressive aspect of the performance. Most reviews celebrated the show’s quality and Ann-Margret's versatility, with some even calling it the best special of the year.

== Synopsis ==
Within the 60 minutes of the television special, Ann-Margret performed in a series of sketches and dance routines. The program mainly concluded musical, scripted acting, and comedic segments

== Production ==
The special was made by Winters-Rosen production. It was produced, directed and choreographed by David Winters and stars Ann-Margret. Guests and cameos include Bob Hope, Jack Benny, and Danny Thomas.

The Ann-Margret Show is filled with musical numbers and is based on her previous successful live club act. Shot in Sweden, Ann-Margret's country of origin, the show includes a song sung by in her native tongue.

Ann-Margret who hadn't appeared on TV for a long time explained her return by saying "so many people ask me why I haven't been on television since 1962. There's one simple reason, no one offered me the kind of material I wanted. I felt that if I appeared on television using material in which I didn't believe I would be cheating the public."

Costumer John Hayles created 14 costumes for Ann-Margret, for the show. He had to make sure that the costumes fitted the moods of the scene and were practical for dance movements. He said "in show of this kind, the adaptability of clothes to movement is of basic importance."

To return Bob Hope's favor of appearing in the special, she joined him at his annual trip to the Far-East to entertain the troupes.

== Reception ==
In The Courier-News, Cynthia Lowry liked it and wrote that it "is a visual treat. The very attractive performer sang, danced and occasionally clowned amid some very exciting sets. She was surrounded in most of the musical numbers by a talented group of male dancers."

In his review written in Tucson Daily Citizen, Rick Du Brow praised Ann-Margret capabilities to perform comedy as refreshing tour de force. He found the dance routine effective and praise her again on how much work she must have done.

Paul Jones of The Atlanta Constitution said it is a program of good quality that "spotlights her (Ann Margret) multiple talents as a singer, actress, dancer and comedienne."

Bettelou Peterson, in her review published in the Detroit Free Press, thought it was too cliché, that we didn't see enough of her musical and comical talents, and that the sketches with guests were filler.

Shirley Eder, also of the Detroit Free Press, praised it saying it "was the best special of the year. She was great."

Joan Crosby, in her review published in The Pittsburgh Press, found the special lavish. She was impressed with Ann-Margret's impression of Ruby Keeler, and highlighted the photography in the segment where she sings a Swedish lullaby.
