= Once Upon a Wheel =

1971 film by David Winters

- Once Upon a Wheel original Poster
- Directed by: David Winters
- Starring: Paul Newman
- Country of origin: United States
- Original language: English

Production
- Producers: David Winters, Burt Rosen
- Running time: 60 min

Original release
- Network: ABC
- Release: April 18, 1971

Once Upon a Wheel is a 1971 ABC television documentary on the history of auto racing. It was hosted by Paul Newman and was directed and produced by David Winters. The production house behind it was Winters/Rosen and the project was sponsored by Coca-Cola. It includes interviews with racers Al Unser, Jackie Oliver, Richard Petty, Stirling Moss, Mario Andretti, John Surtees, LeeRoy Yarbrough and others. It also includes celebrity cameos by Kirk Douglas, Stephen Boyd, Dean Martin, Dick Smothers, Pancho Gonzales and more.

The documentary is split into four sections: "The Men", "The Machine", "The Spectator" and "The Race". These sections deal with the motivation to race, the car itself, the viewers and wives of racers, and ends with conversations with competitors and past champions.

The project was produced by Winters/Rosen. Initially, Newman didn't want to do television, but after hearing Winters' pitch it became a passion project for him, and it marked Newman's first time starring in a television project. Though the film was aired on television in the United States, Newman suggested to Winters to add some footage and release it theatrically internationally.

Upon its release, the film generally received good reviews for its directing, pace, photography, music, and human interest stories.

== Summary ==
The film is divided into four segments: "The Men", "The Machine", "The Spectator" and "The Race".

"The Men" segment begins with Paul Newman driving a race car and narrating his relationship with the sport. He explains that a race track is similar to a theater, with an audience, an array of situations from tragedy to comedy, as well as heroes and villains. It cuts to various clips of race car drivers Al Unser, Jackie Oliver, Richard Petty, Stirling Moss, Mario Andretti, John Surtees, LeeRoy Yarbrough, Denny Hulme, Bobby Allison, Pedro Rodríguez and Bobby Isaac. They explain their motivation and the qualities needed to excel at the sport.

After covering the champions, Newman talks about racers who never win but always come back to race. Racer Butch Sheer, for example, works in junkyard, has a wife and children, races every weekend in order to fulfill his dream of being in the upper echelons of racing.

In the second part, "The Machine", Newman explains the necessity of speed in the service pit during a race, explaining that even a minute can be too long in certain circumstances.

Newman continues the segment with the history of the automobile, comparing modern cars with those from the early days, and he points to the subsequent generation that had the bug to drive. Despite sometimes being an object of mockery in cinema, automobiles moved to mass production, and many people wanted to modify them for racing. The segment ends with presenting the land speed record from the oldest to the newest.

The third segment, "The Spectator", starts with Newman explaining various racing events that millions of spectators attend. He explains that even spectators can be tired at the end of a race, but they are still sad to leave the arena where all the drama took place. A spectator may also wish to drive, which is made possible at the Ontario Motor Speedway, where the Celebrity Pro-Am Race for charity takes place. Famous attendees included Wilt Chamberlain, Pete Conrad, Hugh Downs, Ken Venturi, Dean Martin, Dick Smothers, Pancho Gonzales, Arte Johnson, Kirk Douglas, Stephen Boyd, Glenn Ford, Gail Fisher, Chuck Connors, Don DeFore and Chad Everett.

Newman talks with wives of the racers, who tell about the anxieties they face when their husbands are racing at such high speeds.

The final segment, "The Race", begins with Newman talking about the human nature behind the concept race. He then explains that competitiveness starts very young, and that car racing often starts with kids at the soapbox derby. Interviews with racing champions convey the emotions they go through while racing and pursuing the championships.

== Production ==
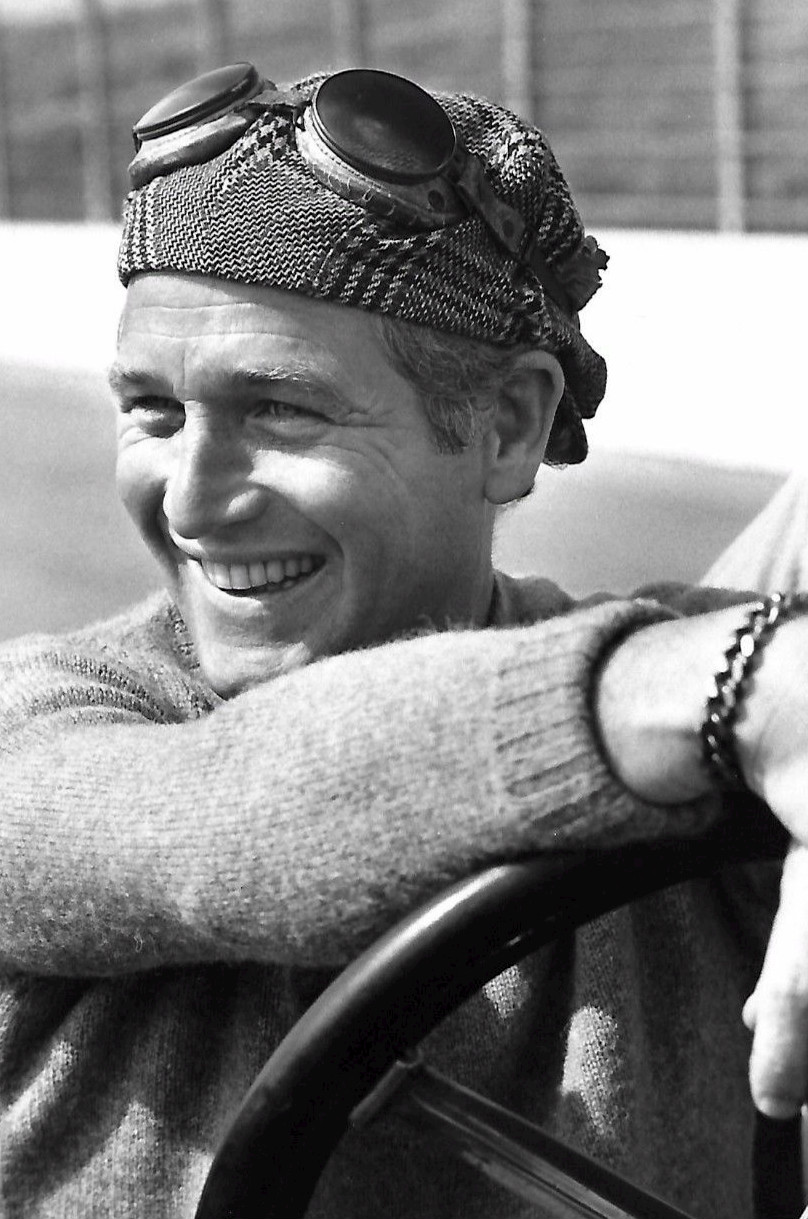
Paul Newman during the shoot of Once Upon a Wheel

The documentary, hosted and narrated by Paul Newman, was made by the production house Winters/Rosen, with David Winters directing and producing.

Winters explained that the project came about when his production company Winters/Rosen had financial difficulties, and if the company didn't come up with $100,000, it would go bankrupt. At the time, Winters had been invited to a celebrity race car event that Newman, with whom he had a friendship, was also attending. Winters suggested the idea of making a racing special to his partner Burt Rosen, to which Rosen replied that if he had Paul Newman's name on it, he could pitch it to Coca-Cola as a sponsor. With footage that Winters shot at the event, he got Newman's name on a release form for that specific event. To much of his frustration, Rosen went on to pitch the project with Newman as the star, not a cameo. So it was left to Winters to convince Newman, who had publicly stated prior disinterest in television. A meeting was organized, but Newman initially turned down the project because it was for TV. Winters, who studied car racing, decided to give Newman the book he used, which Newman read and adored. This allowed Winters to detail how the project was envisioned, and Newman accepted. One of the arguments that helped to convince Newman to take part in the project, was explaining that it "wouldn't be just shots of cars zooming around the tracks."

The project marked Newman's return to television after a decade-long absence, and his first time as the host of a program. Newman, a race car enthusiast, said, "The show gives me a chance to get close to a sport I'm crazy about, I love to test a car on my own, to see what I can do, but racing with 25 other guys is a whole different thing. There are so many variables, the skill demanded is tremendous." Racecar driver Bob Bondurant, Newman's instructor who appears in the film, explained that Once Upon a Wheel was a passion project for Newman "because he wanted to learn how to drive", and that he refused projects that would have paid him a much larger salary. The race tracks locations used were in California, Ohio, North Carolina, Indiana, Florida, Canada, Mexico, Austria, Germany, and Italy.

During post-production, Winters said that Newman, who liked what he saw, gave him the idea to add some additional footage to sell it as a theatrical film worldwide. Winters also explained that Coca-Cola wanted to do a giant ad campaign with Newman, which Rosen accepted without his or Newman's knowledge. So he had to explain this to Newman, who collaborated without making a fuss. Newman appeared in magazine ads wearing a Coke racing jacket. Viewers could order special collectibles related to the show: 8-track cartridges or cassette tapes of music from the show, a cooler that held Cokes and ice, a jacket similar to Newman's and racing jacket style patches.

== Reception ==
Ben Gross of the Daily News said that the documentary "provided action plus human interest", and that it delivered, presenting the "excitement, glamor, glowing exhilaration and dark despondency" of the race car world. He felt that the most interesting aspects were related to the human elements, such as "the personal lives, the hopes, the triumphs, and disappointment of the pro drivers".

In her Pottsville Republican review, Cynthia Lowry called it a "successful effort". She noticed the use of slow motion to show the franticness of changing a tire mid-race, and the way they edited the shots of cars crashing to look like a ballet. At times she found the music obstructive, but overall the documentary held her attention.

In his syndicated review published in The Miami Herald, Jack Anderson, who didn't like the sport of car racing, expressed a better understanding of it. He praised the photography, the locations and the various studies it presents. He said that "auto racing can be exciting, and Newman and the ABC cameraman conveyed this excitement very well".

Harry Harris of The Philadelphia Inquirer found it to be fast-moving but haphazard. His overall consensus was that it is "absorbing and exciting even for non fastness fan".

Jerry Bishop of the Longview Daily News despised it. He felt it was racing trivia mixed with messy editing, instead of the spectacle promised with the story of car racing. He said "it was incomplete, inaccurate and inconclusive".

Jerry Coffey, in his Fort Worth Star-Telegram review, found it too random and superficial, but praised the photography and music.

Tom Hopkins of Dayton Daily News opined that the show started slowly, and that the segment about the losing racer was hokey, but that it moved very well afterwards. He added that "the photography was imaginative and a rock music background gave the program an unusual quality".

Jerry Greene of Florida Today said that the portrait of the racer who keeps losing was the strongest part of the film, and that it came too early and took away from the rest that was still first-rate. His consensus was that Once Upon a Wheel is "probably the most poignant and fascinating presentation on auto-racing that has appeared on television".

Dwight Newton of the San Francisco Examiner said that Once Upon a Wheel is "compiled with old film clips, latter day outtakes, fascinating new material and excellent background music". He went on to praise the syncopation of the black-and-white archival footage used in the film.

Rick Dubrow, in his review published in The Windsor Star, found Once Upon a Wheel to be entertaining, and said that director "Winters always manage to lot of handsome visual image on the home screen". He also felt that the music elevated the racing scenes.

== Soundtrack ==
The soundtrack includes songs by Cher, Kenny Rogers and The First Edition, The Association, Arlo Guthrie, Fresh Air, Wilson Pickett, Neil Young, and James Taylor. It was released only as a promotional item on 8-track cartridges or cassette tapes and distributed by Coca-Cola and Warner Bros. Records. Cher's contribution was titled "Gentle Foe" and it's exclusive to this soundtrack, not appearing on any albums, compilations or other releases by the artist. The tracklist of the cassette tapes differs from the 8-track.

Cassette

Side one
No.	Title	Length
1.	"Fire And Rain (James Taylor)"
2.	"Once Upon A Wheel (The Association)"
3.	"Wheel Of Fortune (Arlo Guthrie)"
4.	"I'm Going To Be A Racin' Star (The Association)"
5.	"Your Love (Means Everything To Me) (Charles Wright & the Watts 103rd Street Rhythm Band)"
6.	"Buddy Can You Spare The Time (Fresh Air)"
7.	"First Sound (The Association)"

Side two
No.	Title	Length
1.	"Camptown Ladies (Kenny Rogers and The First Edition)"
2.	"Gentle Foe (Cher)"
3.	"Engine #9 (Wilson Pickett)"
4.	"Time For Living (The Association)"
5.	"Oh In The Morning (Arlo Guthrie)"
6.	"Moving Wheels (Fresh Air)"

8-Track:

Part one
No.	Title	Length
1.	"Camptown Ladies (Kenny Rogers and The First Edition)"
2.	"Oh In The Morning (Arlo Guthrie)"
3.	"Wheel Of Fortune (Arlo Guthrie)"

Part two
No.	Title	Length
1.	"First Sound (The Association)"
2.	"Gentle Foe (Cher)"
3.	"I'm Going To Be A Racin' Star (The Association)"

Part three
No.	Title	Length
1.	"Moving Wheels (Fresh Air)"
2.	"Once Upon A Wheel (The Association)"
3.	"Birds (Neil Young)"
4.	"Buddy Can You Spare The Time (Fresh Air)"

Part four
No.	Title	Length
1.	"Fire And Rain (James Taylor)"
2.	"Engine #9 (Wilson Pickett)"
3.	"Time For Living (The Association)"

== See also ==
- List of American films of 1971

== Works cited ==
- Winters, David (2018). Tough guys do dance. Pensacola, Florida: Indigo River Publishing. ISBN 978-1-948080-27-9.
