= David Winters (choreographer) =

American actor, dancer, and choreographer (1939–2019)

- Winters in the 1960s
- Born: David Weizer; April 5, 1939; London, England
- Died: April 23, 2019 (aged 80); Fort Lauderdale, Florida, U.S.
- Resting place: Mount Sinai Memorial Park Cemetery
- Citizenship: United Kingdom; United States
- Occupations: Producer; director; actor; screenwriter; film distributor; choreographer; dancer
- Years active: 1954–2019

David Winters (born David Weizer; April 5, 1939 – April 23, 2019) was an English-born American actor, dancer, choreographer, and filmmaker. At a young age, he acted in film and television projects such as Lux Video Theatre, Naked City; Mister Peepers, Rock, Rock, Rock, and Roogie's Bump. He received some attention in Broadway musicals for his roles in West Side Story (1957) and Gypsy (1959). In the film adaptation of West Side Story (1961) he was one of the few actors to be re-cast in a different role than what he performed in the original stage version. West Side Story became the highest grossing motion picture of that year, and won 10 Academy Awards, including Best Picture.

Winters became a dance choreographer. On films, he choreographed several projects with Elvis Presley and Ann-Margret starting with Viva Las Vegas (filmed in 1963). Other dance choreography credits include T.A.M.I. Show (1964), Send Me No Flowers (1964), Billie (1965), A Star Is Born (1976), etc. On television, he was frequently seen with his troupe on a variety of shows choreographing popular dances of the 1960s. At the Emmy Awards, for the television special Movin' with Nancy (1967), his choreography was nominated in the category Special Classification of Individual Achievements.

In the 1970s, Winters ran Winters-Rosen a production house, where he produced, directed, and choreographed television specials. Some of these credits are The Ann-Margret Show (1968), Ann-Margret: From Hollywood With Love (1969), Raquel! (1970), Once Upon a Wheel (1971), Timex All-Star Swing Festival (1972). In films, he directed Alice Cooper: Welcome to My Nightmare (1976), The Last Horror Film (1982), Thrashin' (1986). From the 1980s to the 1990s, Winters ran Action International Pictures where he would produce, distribute and direct action oriented films. From the 2000s to his death in 2019, Winters continued to produce, direct, and act.

== Early life ==
Winters was born David Weizer in London, England, the son of Jewish parents Sadie and Samuel Weizer. His family relocated to the United States in 1953. He became a naturalized United States citizen in 1956. Winters was interested in dancing at an early age.

== Career ==
=== Early 1950s-1967: Early roles, stage musicals, and dance choreography ===
At age 12, Winters was shining shoes to pay for dance classes afraid his mother would not approve. She eventually caught him and made a deal to make him stop: if he did his bar mitzvah, she would bring him to dance classes. That same year, Winters was spotted by a talent agent while dancing in a Manhattan restaurant. From this point he began acting and dancing on television. By the age of 14 he had worked with Jackie Gleason, Martha Raye, Mindy Carson, Sarah Churchill, Wally Cox, George Jessel, Ella Raines, Paul Douglas, and Perry Como. He also was heard on radio plays with Donald Cook and Joseph Cotten. It led him to act in over 15 television shows during a span of 10 years, including Lux Video Theatre, Naked City, The Red Buttons Show, Mister Peepers, etc.

In 1954, Winters acted in the film Roogie's Bump. That year he performed in the first Broadway revival of On Your Toes, directed by George Abbott and choreographed by George Balanchine. It opened on October 11, 1954, at the 46th Street Theatre, where it ran for 64 performances.

On November 23 of that year he acted in another Broadway play called Sandhog. In the musical, Winters alongside Yuriko, Eliot Feld, Muriel Mannings, and Betty Ageloff played a group of kids. Paul Affelder of The Brooklyn Eagle praised all the performances, and found the kids talented.

In 1956, Winters appeared in the film Rock, Rock, Rock!

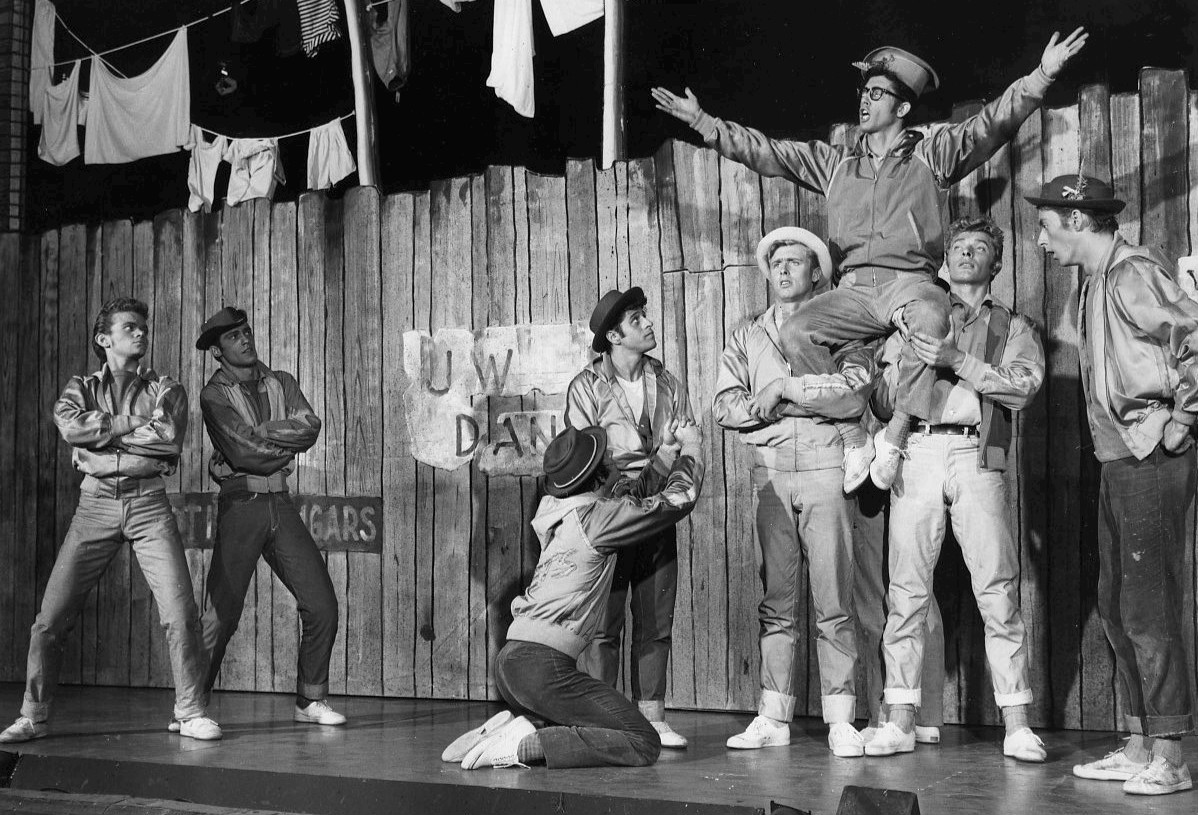
David Winters as Baby John (on the far left) in the original production of West Side Story

In 1957, he performed in Shinbone Alley. The Broadway production opened on April 13, 1957, at The Broadway Theatre and closed on May 25, 1957, after 49 performances. Later that year, he played the role of Baby John in the original Broadway production of West Side Story. Conceived, directed and choreographed by Jerome Robbins, it ran for 732 performances before going on tour. The production was nominated for six Tony Awards including Best Musical.

On May 21, 1959, he starred as Yonkers in the original production of Gypsy. The show was produced by David Merrick and directed and choreographed by Jerome Robbins. Critic Frank Rich has referred to it as one of the more influential stagings of a musical in American theatrical history. The original production received eight Tony Award nominations, including Best Musical. It closed on March 25, 1961, after 702 performances and two previews.

In 1960, he acted in the Broadway musical One More River.

In 1961, he appeared as A-Rab in the movie version of West Side Story directed by Robert Wise and Jerome Robbins. He and Carole D'Andrea, Jay Norman, Tommy Abbott, William Bramley and Tony Mordente were the only actors to have been cast in both the original Broadway show and the motion picture. The film was the highest grossing motion picture of that year, going on to win 10 Academy Awards, including Best Picture.

During that time and moving forward to 1967, he acted regularly on television, he was seen in 77 Sunset Strip, Perry Mason, The Dick Powell Show, and more.

On January 30, 1963, the play Billy Liar made its American premiere with Winters in the title role. Margaret Harford of the Los Angeles Times liked the acting and said that Winters played the role with "coltish swagger".

In 1964, he choreographed George Sidney's Viva Las Vegas starring Elvis Presley and Ann-Margret. Ann-Margret, who was his student at the time, recommended him for the job. That year Winters choreographed Norman Jewison's Send Me No Flowers, Don Weis' Pajama Party, and Steve Binder's T.A.M.I. Show. T.A.M.I. Show would go on to be deemed "culturally, historically, or aesthetically significant" by the United States Library of Congress and selected for preservation in 2006 in the National Film Registry. He also had a role in the film The New Intern. On September 21, the variety show Shindig! premiered where Winters served as a choreographer.

In 1965, he choreographed two musicals starring Elvis Presley: Boris Sagal's Girl Happy and Norman Taurog's Tickle Me. He also choreographed two Ann-Margret films: Bus Riley's Back in Town and Kitten with a Whip. Another choreographer credit was Don Weis' Billie. That year, he started to perform on television with his troupe, named the David Winters Dancers. That year, on the tv show Hullabaloo, he choreographed popular dances of the 1960s, including the Watusi, and originated the Freddy.

In 1966, he co-produced and choreographed the Lucille Ball television special Lucy in London. Also that year he acted in The Crazy-Quilt by John Korty, and The David Winters Dancers also appeared in the television special MJ's. Finally he choreographed two more Ann-Margret films Boris Sagal's Made in Paris, and George Sidney's The Swinger.

In 1967, Winters directed two episodes of the television show The Monkees. He choreographed Elvis Presley in Easy Come, Easy Go. With the David Winters Dancers, he appeared on the television special Go. That year, he was an associate director for the Broadway play Of Love Remembered, directed by Burgess Meredith. Also in 1967, for his choreography on the Nancy Sinatra television special Movin' with Nancy, he received an Emmy nomination in the category Special Classification of Individual Achievements.

=== 1968 to 1986: Subsequent choreography, producing and directing ===
In 1968, he co-founded the production company Winters/Rosen which specialized in television specials. He choreographed and directed The Ann-Margret Show. That year, separately from Winters/Rosen, he choreographed and performed with his troupe on the television special Monte Carlo: C'est La Rose, hosted by Princess Grace Kelly.

In 1969, Winters directed and choreographed Ann-Margret: From Hollywood With Love (for which Winters received an Emmy nomination for dance choreography). Also that year, he produced and choreographed The Spring Thing.

Winters directing Raquel!

On April 26, 1970 CBS released Raquel Welch's first television special Raquel!, Winters produced, directed and choreographed. On the day of the premiere, the show received a 51% share on the National ARB Ratings and an overnight New York Nielsen Rating of 58% share.

In 1971, he produced and directed Once Upon a Wheel, a documentary on auto racing. It is hosted and narrated by actor Paul Newman. Winters said that at the time Newman had publicly stated he didn't want to do television and turned it down for this reason until he pitched his vision to him. The project marked Newman's return to television after a decade long absence, and his first time as the lead of a program. During post-production, Winters said that Newman, who liked what he saw, gave him the idea to add some footage to sell it as a theatrical film worldwide. Upon its release, the documentary generally received good reviews for its directing, pace, photography, music, and human interest stories.

That same year, he was an executive producer for The 5th Dimension's television special The 5th Dimension Traveling Sunshine Show.

In 1972, he produced, directed and choreographed the television special The Special London Bridge Special, starring Tom Jones, and Jennifer O'Neill. That year, he produced Timex All-Star Swing Festival (which won the Peabody Award and a Christopher Award for Winters as its producer), a live concert with performances by jazz musicians Ella Fitzgerald, Duke Ellington, Dave Brubeck, Benny Goodman, Gene Krupa, etc.

In 1973, he directed, choreographed and produced the television movie Dr. Jekyll and Mr. Hyde, starring Kirk Douglas. At the Emmy Awards it was nominated for outstanding achievement in makeup, costume design, and music direction.

In 1975, Winters directed the Alice Cooper concert film Alice Cooper: Welcome to My Nightmare. That same year, he produced the comedy Linda Lovelace for President.

In 1976, he choreographed Frank Pierson's A Star Is Born, starring Barbra Streisand.

The following year he choreographed credits 22 episodes of TV show Donny & Marie. That year he also served as a creative consultant on Don Taylor's The Island of Dr. Moreau.

In 1978, he choreographed Steve Binder's Star Wars Holiday Special.

In 1979 Winters directed the tennis sport comedy Racquet, starring Bert Convy. That same year, he choreographed Mark L. Lester's Roller Boogie. Also in 1979, Diana Ross In Concert premiered on television, Winters conceived and directed the stage production.

In 1980. Winters directed and choreographed the stage show Goosebumps.

In 1981, he choreographed and was creative consultant for the Diana Ross television special Diana.

In 1982, he produced, directed, wrote, and co-starred in the horror comedy The Last Horror Film, starring Joe Spinell and Caroline Munro. It played in film festivals, where it won and received several nominations. It is praised for its unique blend of self-reflexive horror, humor, and inventive filmmaking. Critics highlight its avant-garde approach, using the Cannes Film Festival as a backdrop for a slasher plot that cleverly reflects on the film industry. The movie is described as an entertaining and nostalgic treat for horror fans and a daring guerilla-style production. Many regard it as a cult classic of the genre.

In 1984 he directed the documentary That Was Rock, hosted by Chuck Berry, and a television adaptation of Steadfast Tin Soldier. Also that year he worked as an artistic adviser on the film Blame it on the Night.

In 1985, he directed Girls of Rock & Roll.

In 1986, Winters directed the sports film Thrashin', starring Josh Brolin, and Pamela Gidley. Set in Los Angeles, it's about Cory (Brolin), a teenage competitive skateboarder, and his romance with Chrissy (Gidley). With a notable soundtrack, the film maintains a following. Prior to the casting of Brolin, Winters wanted Johnny Depp to play Cory. That same year, directed the action film Mission Kill, with Robert Ginty.

=== 1987 to 2019: Later works ===
In 1987, Winters opened the production company, Action International Pictures. He hired director David A. Prior, with whom he would work regularly moving forward. That year they released Deadly Prey, Aerobicide, and Mankillers.

In 1988, he directed the action film Rage to Kill starring James Ryan. That year also saw the release of the space opera science fiction film Space Mutiny. While being the credited director, Winters disowned the film. According to him, upon the first shooting day, he was informed that his father had passed. Being emotionally troubled and with a funeral to attend, Winters was unable to perform his duties and passed it on to his assistant director Neal Sundstorm. However, he was informed that the investors had agreed to the film only with Winters as its director, and could face litigation if he withdrew, hence the credit. The film has the reputation of being an amusing, unintentionally funny, and campy B-movie. That year, Winters produced Dead End City, Death Chase, Night Wars, and Phoenix The Warrior.

In 1989, the action film Code Name Vengeance was released, with Winters directing and producing. Robert Ginty played the lead. Winters would go on to produce The Bounty Hunter (1989), Order of Eagle (1989), Future Force (1989), Time Burst - The Final Alliance (1989), Deadly Reactor (1989), Hell on the Battleground (1989), Jungle Assault (1989), The Revenger (1990), Fatal Skies (1990), Future Zone (1990), Deadly Dancer (1990), Operation Warzone (1990), Rapid Fire (1990), The Shooters (1990), The Final Sanction (1990), Lock 'n' Load (1990), Born Killer (1990), Invasion Force (1990), Firehead (1991), Dark Rider (1991), Raw Nerve (1991), Maximum Breakout (1991), Cop-Out (1991), Presumed Guilty (1991), The Last Ride (1991), White Fury (1991), Center of the Web (1992), Armed for Action (1992), Blood on the Badge (1992), and Double Threat (1993).

In 1993, AIP was re-branded as West Side Studios with the intent to take a mainstream direction. Under that banner, he produced Night Trap (1993), Raw Justice (1994), The Dangerous (1995), and Codename: Silencer (1995).

In 1999, Winters produced Rhythm & Blues.

In 2002, he produced, directed, and co-starred the comedy film Welcome 2 Ibiza, which won the Bangkok Film Festival Audience Award.

In 2003, he produced the horror film Devil's Harvest.

In 2005, he produced period filmThe King Maker.

In 2006, Winters acted in Kevin Connor's mini-series Blackbeard.

In 2012, Winters acted in the art house film, Teddy Bear.

In 2015, Dancin': It's On!, a dance film, premiered which Winters directed. For this project, he said he reconnected with his original passion for dancing. The film stars winners and runners-up of the tv shows, So You Think You Can Dance, and Dancing with the Stars, with Witney Carson as its lead.

In 2018, Winters released his memoir Tough Guys Do Dance.

== Death ==
Winters died on 23 April 2019 at the age of 80, from congestive heart failure.

== Personal life ==
Friends with rock singer Alice Cooper upon directing the Welcome to My Nightmare Tour in the mid 1970s, he hired ballerina Sheryl Goddard who became Cooper's wife.

Winters lived with Linda Lovelace as her boyfriend following her divorce from her first husband. Their relationship lasted until 1976. She credited him for bringing culture in her life.

Winters was married at least three times. He had a brother, a daughter, two sons, a stepson, and a granddaughter.

== Awards and nominations ==
Year	Award	Result	Category	Film or series
1968	Emmy Award	Nominated	Special Classification of Individual Achievements	Movin' with Nancy
1970	Emmy Award	Nominated	Outstanding Achievement in Choreography	Ann-Margret: From Hollywood with Love
1971	Best International Sports Documentary	Won	TV special	Once Upon a Wheel
1971	World Television Festival Award	Won	TV special	Once Upon a Wheel
1972	Christopher Award	Won	TV special	Timex All Star Swing Festival (shared with Burt Rosen, Bernard Rothman, and Jack Wohl)
2002	Bangkok Film Festival	Won	Audience Award for Best Picture	Welcome 2 Ibiza
2015	WideScreen Film & Music Video Festival	Won	Best Director	Dancin' It's On!

== Bibliography ==
- Winters, David (2018). Tough guys do dance. Pensacola, Florida: Indigo River Publishing. ISBN 978-1-948080-27-9.

== Works cited ==
- Rich, Frank (1989). The Hot Seat: Theater Criticism for The New York Times, 1980–1993. Random House. 1998. ISBN 978-0-679-45300-0
- Naden, Corinne J. (2011). The Golden Age of American Musical Theatre: 1943–1965. Scarecrow Press. ISBN 978-0-8108-7734-4
- Grant, Barry Keith (2012). The Hollywood Film Musical. Wiley-Blackwell. ISBN 978-1-4051-8253-9
- Ingle, Zachary; Sutera, David M. (2013). Identity and Myth in Sports Documentaries: Critical Essays. Rowman & Littlefield. ISBN 978-0-8108-8789-3
- Winters, David (2018). Tough guys do dance. Pensacola, Florida: Indigo River Publishing. ISBN 978-1-948080-27-9.
