= Steven Kent (television producer) =

Steven Kent is an American television producer, writer, director, and media executive.

== Career ==
In June 2007, Kent was named Senior Executive Vice President of Programming at Sony Pictures Television, overseeing the studio's daytime dramas The Young and the Restless on CBS Daytime and Days of Our Lives on NBC Daytime. In his new role, Kent is responsible for creating program extensions and developing new serialized programs for all dayparts. Kent reports to SPT president Steve Mosko. He continued in this role until the spring of 2024 when the position was discontinued.

Kent most recently was Senior Executive Vice President of International Productions at Sony Pictures Television International, where he oversaw the worldwide development and production of original local-language productions as well as scripted and unscripted formats.

"Steve has done a phenomenal job working with our producers to make our daytime dramas financially efficient and technically state of the art," Mosko said. "With his incredible experience with serialized programming here and around the world, he's an expert in the field in every way."

Kent joined the company in 1996 as Vice President of Production for then Columbia TriStar Television, working on such series as Dawson's Creek and Early Edition. During this time, he also was instrumental in the formation of the company's domestic Spanish-language production division, overseeing the development and production of shows for Telemundo.

== Credits ==
- The Young and the Restless (executive in charge) June 2024 - Present
- Black Tie Nights (starring Glen Meadows, Beverly Lynne, Tiffany Bolton, and Amy Lindsay)
- 919 Fifth Avenue
- Santa Barbara
- Capitol

== Awards and nominations ==
Kent was nominated four times for a Daytime Emmy Award from 1987 to 1990, and won three times.
