= Mind Twister =

- U.S. American Film Market theatrical poster
- Directed by: Fred Olen Ray
- Written by: Mark Thomas McGee
- Produced by: Luigi Cingolani
- Starring: Suzanne Slater; Telly Savalas; Gary Hudson
- Cinematography: Gary Graver
- Edited by: W. Peter Miller
- Music by: Peter Rotter
- Production company: Smart Egg Pictures
- Distributed by: VCI Home Video
- Release date: March 16, 1994
- Running time: 87 minutes 94 minutes (unrated)
- Country: United States
- Language: English
- Budget: $1,000,000

Mind Twister is a 1994 American erotic thriller film directed by Fred Olen Ray, written by Mark Thomas McGee, and produced by Luigi Cingolani and Smart Egg Pictures.

After the profitable release of his previous erotic thriller Inner Sanctum, Ray saw potential for the genre in the direct-to-video market and helmed the production of a number of these films during the early-to-mid 1990s. Mind Twister debuted theatrically for distributors at the 1993 American Film Market. It was eventually picked up and released by VCI Home Video in early 1994. Mind Twister is one of the final acting roles for Telly Savalas before his death the same year. The movie received an overall below-average response from critics.

== Synopsis ==
Set in Los Angeles, the film takes place largely following the brutal homicide of an exotic dancer at the hands of an unknown killer. Suspecting a local psychiatrist, named Daniel Strahten, to be the murderer, the victim's friend, Heather, goes undercover as his therapy patient to reveal the truth, while Richard Howland, a seasoned police detective, follows the case. However, the real killer is Dr. Strahten's wife Lisa, in which she and her husband (who already knows she is the killer) suspect Heather is not who she appears to be and plot to investigate her in order to find the opportunity to kill her as well.

== Cast ==
- Telly Savalas as Richard Howland
- Suzanne Slater as Heather Black
- Gary Hudson as Daniel Strahten
- Erika Nann as Lisa Strahten
- Richard Roundtree as Frank Webb
- Maria Ford as Melanie Duncan
- Nels Van Patten as Roy Gerard
- Angel Ashley as Harley Quinn
- Laurie Sherman as Kris
- Sam Hiona as Michael Kim
- Deborah Dutch as Sheila Harrison
- John Blyth Barrymore as Pizza Delivery Boy
- Fred Olen Ray as Photographer
- Gus Savalas as Detective #1
- Luigi Cingolani as Detective #2
- Walter Calmette as Policeman
- Carl DeForest as Man At Door
- Justin Carroll as Young Stud
- Vincent Barbi as Man Holding Mutt
- Paula Raymond as Agnes
- Robert Quarry as Bob

== Production ==
Mind Twister was directed by Fred Olen Ray and produced by Luigi Cingolani and his company Smart Egg Pictures. The screenplay was written by Mark Thomas McGee, who had collaborated with Ray on his previous erotic thriller Inner Sanctum. After the commercial success of Inner Sanctum as a direct-to-video release, Ray saw the genre as potentially lucrative for independent film companies within this release market, calling it "an innovative means for independents to re-enter the distribution arena with less cash being risked and more secure returns." This led Ray to produce a string of erotic thrillers in the early to mid-1990s. Mind Twister was produced on a budget of about one million dollars, making it one of Ray's more expensive ventures for this genre. It was shot at the Lacy Street Production Center in Los Angeles in 1992. Gary Graver served as the cinematographer.

Inner Sanctum star Tanya Roberts was originally planned for the leading female role, but dropped out of the project. Ray's colleague and fellow director Jim Wynorski suggested Suzanne Slater, with whom he had worked on the horror film Chopping Mall a few years earlier. Slater was given the part after her second reading of the script. Mind Twister was one of the last roles of Telly Savalas before his death. The movie's opening death scene of the character Sheila Harrison crashing through a window featured actress Deborah Dutch, who convinced Ray to allow her to perform the stunt herself in a single take. Other ancillary roles were given to veteran actors Robert Quarry and Paula Raymond. Quarry appeared in numerous movies directed by Ray before and after the release of Mind Twister. The film was the final on-screen role for Raymond before her retirement. Ray stated that he had at once been in contact with retired actor Gordon Scott to appear in the film.

== Release ==
In order to shop for a US distributor, Mind Twister was screened theatrically on February 27, 1993 at the annual American Film Market in Santa Monica. VCI Home Video released the film on VHS in March 1994. It was given two releases, one unrated "Red Hot Director's Cut" version with a runtime of 94 minutes and another R-rated version with the sex scenes removed and a runtime of 87 minutes. Editor W. Peter Miller explained that these cuts were made specifically due to the sex scene between Erika Nann and Suzanne Slater. The crew was fearful this would cause the MPAA to issue the film an NC-17 rating and further limit its US distribution among retailers and rental chains such as Blockbuster.

== Reception ==
Overall critical reception for Mind Twister has been below-average. Glenn Kenny of Entertainment Weekly gave Mind Twister a "C−", calling the film "standard-issue erotic-thriller gunk". He praised Savalas as having "forgotten more about acting than most of his costars ever knew" and called his character's seemingly bipolar tendencies "enjoyably loopy". Online critic Dennis Schwartz gave the film a slightly more positive "C", appreciating its suspense and proclaiming it to be "worth seeing only for Telly Savalas fans" even with its "lame screenplay". The writers of the magazine Psychotronic Video labeled Mind Twister "senseless" and expressed disappointment that it was one of Savalas' final acting roles.
