= Banali (surname) =

Banali is a surname. Notable people with the surname include:

- Frankie Banali (1951–2020), American rock drummer
- Regina Russell Banali (born 1965), American producer, actress, director, and television presenter
