= Cynthia Webster =

American cinematographer

- Other names: Brett Webster
- Occupation: Cinematographer
- Parent: Nicholas Webster

Cynthia Webster is an American cinematographer known for her work on films like Brush with Death and Scalps.

== Biography ==
Cynthia got her start as a cinematographer in the late 70s; some of her earliest credits (as Brett Webster) were on films like Fred Olen Ray's Scalps (1983), Broken Victory (1988), and Totally Exposed (1991). Her father, Nicholas Webster, directed films like Santa Claus Conquers the Martians.

== Selected filmography ==
- Hang Your Dog in the Wind (1997)
- Butch Camp (1996)
- Shades of Blue (1992)
- Tuesday Never Comes (1992)
- A Sensuous Summer (1991)
- Pleasure in Paradise (1991)
- The Swindle (1991)
- Totally Exposed (1991)
- Brush with Death (1990)
- Broken Victory (1988)
- Scalps (1983)
