= Suzee Slater =

American actress and model

Suzanne M. Slater
- Born: Goodland, Kansas, US
- Other names: Suzee Slater, Sue Slater
- Occupations: Actress, model
- Years active: 1984–1994
- Known for: Chopping Mall, Mind Twister

Suzanne M. Slater, also credited as Suzee Slater, is an American former actress and model best known as Leslie Todd in the horror film Chopping Mall. She had several minor roles in movies and television in the late 1980s and early 1990s before abruptly leaving the acting industry.

== Early life and career ==
Suzee Slater was born in Goodland, Kansas and was raised in Omaha, Nebraska. She attended the University of Nebraska for one year, then worked as a flight attendant for MGM Grand Air, specializing in short-run celebrity flights. Slater eventually met a talent agent at an airline party. After landing a role on an episode of the television series Mickey Spillane's Mike Hammer, Slater joined the Screen Actors Guild and moved to Los Angeles. She quickly earned brief appearances in the 1984 films Savage Streets and Summer Fantasy.

Slater's most well-known acting credit came as she played the ill-fated Leslie Todd in the 1986 horror movie Chopping Mall, directed by Jim Wynorski and co-produced by Roger and Julie Corman. One of Roger Corman's few requirements was a certain amount of gratuitous nudity, a staple of his production company's releases. Wynorski cast Slater based on her statuesque, buxom figure. Her character's exploding-head death sequence is cited as one of the now-cult film's most memorable scenes among horror aficionados. In a 1993 interview with the magazine Femme Fatales, Slater admitted a certain amount of regret for doing the movie, claiming it "falsely linked [her] to a damned 'scream queen' title." Slater appeared on the poster for the 1986 slasher Sorority House Massacre despite not appearing in the film itself.

After Chopping Mall, she continued to gain minor bit parts in movies and some short-lived television shows through the end of the decade, as well as modeling work for the likes of glamour photographer Peter Gowland. Many of her film roles involved nudity, which she stated she did not mind. However, she wished to avoid being typecast as a "topless bimbo" character, even turning down a role in Jeff Broadstreet's Sexbomb despite her need for work. Slater mentioned in a 1989 Playboy article that she desired "a part in a really steamy movie, like 9½ Weeks. Her last major role in the movie industry was Heather Black in the 1994 erotic thriller Mind Twister, directed by Fred Olen Ray, in which Slater received top-billing. She was suggested by Wynorski after lead actress Tanya Roberts dropped out of the project. The part called for lengthy softcore sex scenes with her co-stars Erica Nann and Nels Van Patten, a first for Slater.

Shortly after the release of Mind Twister, Slater suddenly retired from acting and disappeared from the public eye. Fellow Chopping Mall actress Barbara Crampton explained in 2016 that the two failed to keep in contact in the years following that film's release. The movie's crew had been unable to locate Slater, making her one of the few surviving cast members to not attend the 30th anniversary screening of Chopping Mall.

== Personal life ==
Suzee Slater had a mother and brother, both of whom moved out to California to be closer to her. Slater once dated screenwriter Stanley Weiser.

== Filmography ==
=== Film ===
Year	Title	Role	Notes
1994	Mind Twister	Heather Black	
1990	Cartel	Nancy	
1989	The Big Picture	Stewardess	
1988	Take Two	Sherrie	
1987	Real Men	Woman in Bed	
1986	Las Vegas Serial Killer	Photographer's Model	
1986	Chopping Mall	Leslie Todd	
1984	Savage Streets	Fadden's girlfriend	Uncredited
1984	Summer Fantasy	Extra	Uncredited

=== Television ===
Year	Title	Role	Notes
1993	Hearts Afire	Woman #2	1 episode ("First Edition")
1989	Nearly Departed	Woman at bar	1 episode ("Grandpa's Date")
1988	Trial and Error		Unaired
1987	Second Chance	Becky Sue	1 episode ("The End")
1984	Mickey Spillane's Mike Hammer	Beverly	1 episode ("A Death in the Family")
