= Black Tie Nights =

- Black Tie Nights Season 1 DVD cover art
- Also known as: Hollywood Sexcapades
- Genre: Softcore, Drama
- Created by: Brian Hurwitz
- Starring: Beverly Lynne; Tiffany Bolton; Amy Lindsay
- Composer: Ramón Balcázar
- Country of origin: United States
- Original language: English
- No. of seasons: 2
- No. of episodes: 26

Production
- Executive producer: Jon Kramer
- Producer: Steve Beswick
- Camera setup: Single-camera
- Running time: Approx. 28 minutes
- Production companies: Black Tie Films; POV Pictures; HBO Entertainment

Original release
- Network: Cinemax
- Release: June 4, 2004 – December 30, 2005

Black Tie Nights is a softcore drama anthology series which aired on Cinemax in the United States from 2004 to 2005.

This anthology show revolved around the adventures of Olivia Hartley and Cooper Snow who ran Black Tie dating service. They were assisted by their geeky sidekick, Ryan Lundy. Each week they would encounter new or returning customers and try to play matchmaker. The first season had two main subplots that continued in each episode. The first was the budding romance between Ryan and Cooper. The second was Olivia getting over the loss of her husband and dating again.

In the second season, the show was retooled. The anthology series was renamed Hollywood Sexcapades and the characters of Olivia and Cooper were said to be out of the country opening a new branch. Candi Hicks, a recurring customer in the first season, became the new employee of Black Tie dating service. She and Ryan (who was no longer nerdish) partnered to run the company, and the continuing subplot was the budding romance between these two characters. Each week they would continue to try to play matchmaker to that episode's guest stars.

== Cast ==
- Glen Meadows as Ryan Lundy
- Beverly Lynne as Candi Hicks
- Tiffany Bolton as Cooper Snow
- Amy Lindsay as Olivia Hartley

== Episodes ==
=== Season 1 (2004) ===
1. "Date and Switch" – June 4, 2004
2. "Naughty and Nice" – June 11, 2004
3. "Beauty and the Beach" – June 18, 2004
4. "A Girl Thing" – June 25, 2004
5. "The Sex Sense" – July 2, 2004
6. "Luck Be a Lady" – July 9, 2004
7. "Girl on Page 19" – July 16, 2004
8. "Makeover" – July 23, 2004
9. "Love is Blind" – July 30, 2004
10. "The Legend" – August 6, 2004
11. "Whose Thong Is It, Anyway?" – August 13, 2004
12. "Internal Affairs" – August 20, 2004
13. "Something Wilder" – August 27, 2004

=== Season 2 (2005) ===
1. "Dutch Treat" – October 7, 2005
2. "Competitive Juices" – October 14, 2005
3. "Sexual Healing" – October 21, 2005
4. "Confessions in the Dark" – October 28, 2005
5. "Undercover Girl" – November 4, 2005
6. "Mile High Club" – November 11, 2005
7. "Pajama Club" – November 18, 2005
8. "Sensational" – November 25, 2005
9. "Chick Boxers" – December 2, 2005
10. "Let's Play Doctor" – December 9, 2005
11. "In Good Hands" – December 16, 2005
12. "Sexperience" – December 23, 2005
13. "Candi Hearts" – December 30, 2005
