= Bikini Airways =

2003 American television film

- Written by: Fred Olen Ray (as Nicholas Juan Medina)
- Directed by: Fred Olen Ray (as Nicholas Juan Medina)
- Starring: Regina Russell; Brad Bartram; Jay Richardson; Dan Golden; Kim Maddox; Belinda Gavin; Amy Lindsay; Noah Frank; Frankie Cullen; Leland Jay; Kimberly A. Ray; Maya Divine; Eric Masterson; Dennis L. Baker; Brad Linaweaver; Kimber Lynn; Paul Mack
- Theme music composer: Anthony Francis
- Country of origin: United States
- Original language: English

Production
- Producer: Kimberly A. Ray
- Cinematography: Gary Graver
- Running time: 85 minutes
- Production company: American Independent Productions

Original release
- Release: October 11, 2003

Bikini Airways is a 2003 American made for cable erotic film written and directed by Fred Olen Ray (under the pseudonym Nicholas Juan Medina).

== Plot ==
Terri, after inheriting an airline from her late uncle (and the debt that goes with it), gets a wealthy oil tycoon to pay $25,000 to have his bachelor party on her first flight.

== Cast ==
- Regina Russell, as Terri

== Background ==
The film was produced by the production company American Independent Productions and distributed by Retromedia Entertainment.

Ray said he made the film "on a lark and it did really well" so that it ushered in a series of bikini films.

== Release ==
It was broadcast several times in the winter of 2003 at fixed times and on demand on the premium channels Cinemax and Showtime.

=== Home video ===
It was released as double feature with Bikini Chain Gang in 2005. A new DVD version was released in 2018 for the 15th anniversary of the film.

== Reception ==
The film was given 2.5 out of 4 by Dr. Gore's Movie Reviews. It was also rated 8 out of 10 by Tarstarkas.net.

The film is part of a cult softcore Bikini film series, directed by Ray.
