= Shantytown Honeymoon =

1972 film by Donn Davison

- Theatrical poster
- Directed by: Donn Davison; Fred Olen Ray (additional scenes, 1986)
- Written by: Barbara Morris Davison
- Produced by: Donn Davison; Fred Olen Ray (additional scenes, 1986)
- Starring: Ashley Brooks; George Ellis; Trudy Moore; Mike Coolik
- Narrated by: Frank Jones (original); John Carradine (1986 version)
- Cinematography: Avrum M. Fine
- Edited by: Avrum M. Fine
- Production companies: Lion Dog Films (original); American Independent Pictures (1986 version)
- Distributed by: Lion Dog Enterprises (original); Troma (1986 version)
- Release date: June 1972
- Running time: 85 minutes
- Language: English
- Budget: $50,000

Shantytown Honeymoon is a 1972 crime thriller film directed by Donn Davison, starring Ashley Brooks, George Ellis, Trudy Moore and Jim Peck. The film has been re-released under a number of titles, including a 1986 re-edit by Fred Olen Ray known as Demented Death Farm Massacre, which replaces Frank Jones with John Carradine as a new host character.

== Plot ==
A group of jewel thieves on the lam run out of fuel in the middle of the countryside. They wander into a backwoods farm, hoping to hide out for the time being. The property belongs to an age-disparate couple, the Cravens. When the husband returns home only to find the thieves there, he hatches a deadly plan. The story is intercut with the moralistic musings of a radio preacher, Brother Love (replaced by the Judge of Hell in the 1986 version), who warns the audience against the sinful behavior displayed in the film.

== Cast ==
- Ashley Brooks as Reba Sue Craven
- George Ellis as Harlan P. Craven
- Trudy Moore as Karen
- Mike Coolik as Kirk
- Jim Peck as Phillip
- Pepper Thurston as Suzanne
- Valarie Lipsey as Madame Jessabelle
- R. Kenneth Wade as Tobe
- Frank Jones as Brother Love (original version)
- John Carradine as The Judge of Hell (1986 re-release)

== Production ==
=== Development ===
The story was written by Davison's wife Beverly, who initially intended it for a paperback pulp novel. The inclusion of a religious character may have been influenced by the southern exploitation film Preacherman, whose recent success Davison said he hoped to emulate. The Atlanta Journal announced the film in August 1971 under the working title Honeymoon. Some sources indicate that the title Brother Love may also have been considered. Stan Friedman was originally announced as producer. The film was eventually produced by Davison, while tar heel exploitation specialist J.G. Patterson was enlisted to help organize one leg of the shoot taking place in Charlotte. The project backed by five investor groups, mostly theater exhibitors.

Photography was projected to begin in November 1971 in Atlanta. But by early 1972, it had not yet proceeded, and was now slated for January 20, although Davison was still looking for the main location, after turning down six houses that looked appropriately decrepit from the outside, but not dingy enough once inside. It was further delayed to February 5. Whether in good faith or not, Honeymoon was pitched as a fairly ambitious product by exploitation standards, and Davison boasted of a $200,000 provisional budget. Per a January 1972 news item, he intended to retain the 3D process he had employed for Asylum of the Insane, an augmented re-release of She Freak, although that seemingly did not pan out. The car chase was also supposed to be more elaborate than what ended up in the picture, and employ a helicopter-mounted camera.

=== Casting ===
The cast mostly came from the Southeast region. George Ellis was a minor celebrity in Georgia as comedy horror host Bestoink Dooley and starred as that character in the film The Legend of Blood Mountain, which Davison would partially re-shoot as The Legend of McCullough's Mountain in 1975. Ashley Brooks had appeared in Davison's Asylum of the Insane just prior. Mike Coolik was a student of Florida-based playwright Cal Yeomans. The producers tried to find a real preacher to play Brother Love, but settled for a Charlotte area theater booker named Frank Jones. Early press announced the participation of Millie Fogo, who had previously worked for Davison, and a Danish actress named Tanya Hansen, but neither are credited in the finished picture.

=== Filming ===
The schedule called for the shoot to begin with 10 days at the film's central location, the Cravens' house, which Davison eventually found one mile outside of Roswell, Georgia. But those sessions, which took place in February 1972, were disrupted when several planned exteriors were rained out. One week of filming had already been planned around Tampa to capture the car chase. Scenes meant for Roswell were relocated to central Florida, and shot in the first week of March at a place called L&L Ranch in Dade City. Another week was also lined up in the Charlotte area to take advantage of mountain backdrops. It was projected by the local press to take place during the second half of March, although it unknown if it actually happened. A crew member quoted a budget of $50,000 to the Atlanta Journal during filming, vastly down from Davison's pre-production estimate, and even that amount may have been optimistic.

== Release ==
The film was released in June 1972 in a self-distributed release from Lion Dog Enterprises, which originally focused on Virginia and the Carolinas before expanding to other territories. The film was often presented in a double bill with the country concert film City Slickers at the Opry. Some of those local screenings were accompanied by in-character appearances from "Brother Love". Some promotional materials used the screenplay's origins as a canned novel to drum up the film's sensational contents.

Davison was a savvy exploiter and, according to Psychotronic Video, released the film under at least six different names. Among them were Honey Pie, Honey Britches, Hillbilly Hooker (to package it on a 1975 double bill with House of Hookers) and Little Whorehouse on the Prairie. Some of these were purely promotional titles, and Little Whorehouse on the Prairie was just a catch-all moniker plastered on a variety of films promoted by Davison.

== 1986 version ==
Fred Olen Ray, who in the early 1980s dabbled in film sales to finance his fledgling directorial career, was offered ownership of Shantytown Honeymoon for $5,500. As the materials offered to him were not mixed, Ray reasoned that he could easily replace the score and emphasize the film's few bloody moments to repackage it as a slasher, which it was not. He also changed the title to Death Farm, but it still struggled to sell. As the Brother Love character never interacted with the principal actors, Ray axed his footage and booked John Carradine to play a similar host called the "Judge of Hell" for added star power. The new content was shot at Movie Tech studios in Van Nuys, California, on December 14, 1985. Carradine was paid $2,400, although Ray took the opportunity to have him recite two more generic monologues that could be inserted into future films. For Death Farm, the director asked Carradine to simply repeat Brother Love's original lines, but the latter proved knowledgeable about the Bible, and suggested more pertinent ones.

Continental Video, who had distributed Scalps on tape, bought the domestic rights for $15,000 but never released it. Meanwhile, Troma approached Ray about buying another oldie from him, Invasion of the Blood Farmers. When it turned out that he only had partial rights to that film, he offered them non-domestic rights to Death Farm, and a deal was reached for $12,500. Ray later mentioned that payments received from Troma for the rights to Death Farm totaled $25,000.

Troma further changed the title to Demented Death Farm Massacre, while retaining a key art and promotional slogan ("First we plant the perversion, then we harvest the horror") that resembled those of Invasion. They premiered the new version at the 1987 American Film Market. Due to the success of his recent films, the company credited Ray as a bonafide co-director, which he called "dishonest" and potentially harmful to his career at the time. The company put the title up for sale in TV syndication, but it would not be available for years on domestic home video.

== Reception ==
Reviewing Ray's version, British reference book Elliot's Guide to Home Entertainment rated it one out of five stars and called it a "bottom-of-the-barrel horror spoof" and "about as amusing as a cold night out in the rain." Michael J. Wheldon's Psychotronic Video Guide To Film concurred, calling it "a sad project". In a more recent review, DVDtalk was somewhat kinder, noting that it "is NOT all bad. It's not all good, either. It's smack dab in the middle of mindless mountain doodie."

== Home media ==
Ray's version was certified for release in Australia through Seven Keys Video in 1987, but no example of this tape could be found. However, a 1989 tape was issued through another Australian imprint, Filmpac, under licence from Troma. A U.K. version was distributed by Troma's local branch in 1996. The parent outfit also made the tape available in the U.S., but in the same PAL format. The original Davison version, in a copy bearing the Honey Britches title and sourced from an Ohio drive-in, was published by grey market distributor Something Weird Video around the same time. Ray's version was brought to domestic DVD in July 2004, in the first volume of Troma's Toxie's Triple Terror box set collection.
