= Ross Hagen =

American actor and screenwriter (1938–2011)

- Hagen in Daktari, 1968
- Born: Leland Lando Lilly; May 21, 1938; Williams, Arizona, U.S.
- Died: May 7, 2011 (aged 72); Brentwood, Los Angeles, California, U.S.
- Occupations: Actor, voice actor, film director, screenwriter, film producer
- Years active: 1966–2010
- Spouse: Claire Polan (m. 1963; died 2003)
- Children: 2

Ross Hagen (born Leland Lando Lilly; May 21, 1938 – May 7, 2011) was an American actor, voice actor, director, screenwriter and producer whose television acting credits included Daktari. His film credits included The Hellcats in 1967 and The Sidehackers in 1969. His video game credits included Red Dead Redemption and its expansion pack Undead Nightmare.

== Personal life ==
Hagen was born in Williams, Arizona, on May 21, 1938. However, he was raised on an Oregon farm. Hagen and his first wife had two children, Bob Lilly and Julie Lilly-Beloit. He was married to his second wife, Claire Polan, an actress from 1963 until her death in 2003. Outside of acting, Hagen also served in the United States Army.

== Career ==
Hagen began his acting career during the 1960s. His early career included guest appearances on The Virginian, The Big Valley, and Here Come the Brides. He was cast in the CBS television series Daktari, in 1968. He portrayed a safari photographer named Bart Jason until the end of the show in 1969. Hagen's other film credits included The Mini-Skirt Mob and Speedway in 1968, The Devil's 8 (1969), The Organization (1971), Angels' Wild Women (1972), Melinda (1972), Wonder Women (1973), Night Creature (1978), Angel (1984), Avenging Angel (1985) and Armed Response (1986). His other credits as a director and producer have included Reel Horror, The Media Madman and Time Wars. He also starred in Dinosaur Island and Fugitive Rage, both directed by Fred Olen Ray.

Hagen also played Landon Ricketts, a retired gunslinger, in the video games Red Dead Redemption and Undead Nightmare.

== Death ==
Ross Hagen died of cancer at his home in Brentwood, Los Angeles, on May 7, 2011, at the age of 72.

== Legacy ==
Two locations in the 2018 video game Red Dead Redemption 2, the prequel to Red Dead Redemption in which Hagen starred, were named Mount Hagen and Hagen Orchards in the late actor's honor.

== Filmography ==
=== Films ===
Year	Title	Role	Notes
1967	Gunfight in Abilene	Lt. Faron	Uncredited
1968	Speedway	Paul Dado	
1968	The Hellcats	Monte	
1968	The Mini-Skirt Mob	Jeff Logan	
1969	Mark of the Gun	Justin Kane	
1969	The Devil's 8	Frank Davis	
1969	The Sidehackers	Rommel	
1971	The Organization	Chet	
1972	Melinda	Gregg Van	
1972	Angels' Wild Women	Speed	
1973	Wonder Women	Mike Harber	
1973	Bad Charleston Charlie	Charlie Jacobs	
1973	Pushing Up Daisies	Maddux	
1975	Supercock	Seth Calhoun	
1978	Night Creature	Ross	
1984	Angel	Urban Cowboy	
1985	Avenging Angel	Ray Mitchell	
1986	Armed Response	Cory Thorton	
1986	Prison Ship	Bantor	
1987	Commando Squad	Cowboy	
1988	The Phantom Empire	Cort Eastman	
1988	Warlords	Beaumont	
1989	Action U.S.A.	Drago	
1989	B.O.R.N.	Buck Cassidy	
1990	Alienator	Kol	
1990	Click: The Calendar Girl Killer	Jack	
1990	Blood Games	Midnight	
1992	The Media Madman	The Warden	
1993	Time Wars	Tomahawk	
1994	Dinosaur Island	Capt. Jason Briggs	
1995	Hard Bounty	Sheriff	
1995	Bikini Drive-In	Harry	
1995	Virtual Desire	Crank	
1995	Droid Gunner	Bartender	
1995	Rebellious	Fred	
1995	Midnight Tease II	John Donnelly	
1995	Attack of the 60 Foot Centerfold	Truck Driver	
1996	Over the Wire	Det. Jackson	
1996	Night Shade	Detective Crank	
1996	Fugitive Rage	Ryker	
1997	Illicit Dreams 2	Brady	
1997	Sexual Roulette	Marty	
1998	Jungle Boy	Sabre the Leopard	Voice
1999	The Kid with X-Ray Eyes	Patterson	
1999	The Elf Who Didn't Believe	Joe Rollins	
2000	Sideshow	Sheriff	
2000	Inviati speciali		
2004	For No Good Reason		
2005	Murder on the Yellow Brick Road	Elwood Dick	
2006	Ray of Sunshine		

=== Television ===
Year	Title	Role	Notes
1966	The Big Valley	Troy	1 episode
1966	Shane	Floyd Pettyburn / Floyd	2 episodes
1966	T.H.E. Cat	Paul Cheever	1 episode
1966–1967	The Virginian	Bassett / Tern / Carl Stacy	3 episodes
1967	The Road West		1 episode
1967	Captain Nice	Jake	1 episode
1967	The Fugitive	Officer Harry Benton	1 episode
1967	The Wild Wild West	Gabe Kelso	S3 E14: "The Night of the Iron Fist"
1967–1968	The Invaders	Perry / Jorden	2 episodes
1967–1971	Gunsmoke	Hicks / Luke Riker / Kay Cee/Pike	4 episodes
1968	The Guns of Will Sonnett	Doak Redford	1 episode
1968–1969	Daktari	Bart Jason	13 episodes
1968–1970	The F.B.I.	Banjo Boggs / Joseph Schaffler / Jake Walling	3 episodes
1969	The Outcasts	Clay	1 episode
1969	Here Come the Brides	Bounty Hunter Blackburn / Jobe	2 episodes
1969–1970	Lancer	Clint / Harmon Cooper	2 episodes
1970	Bonanza	Rader	1 episode
1970–1971	Mannix	Krebs / Croaker	2 episodes
1971	O'Hara, U.S. Treasury		1 episode
1972	Longstreet	Carl Tessman	1 episode
1973	Kung Fu	Herman Skowrin	1 episode
1973	Mission: Impossible	Fred Snelling	1 episode
1973	The Rookies	Pike	1 episode
1973	Cannon	Wendell Davis	1 episode
1974	McMillan & Wife	Brady	1 episode
1982	Bret Maverick	Cole Farnsworth	1 episode
1984	The Fall Guy		Episode: "Terror U"
1986	Danger Bay	Caldwell	1 episode

=== Video games ===
Year	Title	Role
2010	Red Dead Redemption	Landon Ricketts (voice and motion capture)
2010	Red Dead Redemption: Undead Nightmare	Landon Ricketts (voice and motion capture)
