= Fugitive Rage =

- Film poster
- Directed by: Fred Olen Ray
- Screenplay by: Dani Michaeli; Sean O'Bannon
- Produced by: Fred Olen Ray; Jim Wynorski (as Noble Henry)
- Starring: Shauna O'Brien; Wendy Schumacher; Jay Richardson; Tim Abell
- Cinematography: James Lawrence Spencer
- Edited by: Peter Miller
- Music by: Adam Berry
- Release date: 1996
- Running time: 90 minutes
- Language: English

Fugitive Rage (also known as Caged Fear) is a 1996 crime drama action film directed by Fred Olen Ray and starring Shauna O'Brien, Jay Richardson and Alexander Keith, credited as Wendy Schumacher. The film was released straight to video in 1996.

== Plot ==
Tara McCormick is sent to prison for the attempted murder of a local drug lord named Tommy Stompanato. Inside, she befriends Josie and is approached by an agent of the government to finish the job she started in exchange for her freedom.

== Cast ==
- Shauna O'Brien as Josie Williams
- Alexander Keith (credited as Wendy Schumacher) as Tara McCormick
- Jay Richardson as Tommy Stompanato
- Ross Hagen as Ryker
- Tim Abell as James O'Keefe
- Toni Naples as Helga
- Katherine Victor as Miss Prince
- Johnny Vincent as Farino
- Rick Montana as DeLuca
- Calista Carradine as Sharrisse
- Nikki Fritz as Wendy, The Nurse

== Reception ==
TV Guide gave the film one star out of four, stating "Fugitive Rage is an utter fantasy, and a bad one at that."
