= The Brain Leeches =

- 2022 VHS cover art by Future Video
- Directed by: Fred Olen Ray
- Written by: Jim Kennedy; Brad Linaweaver; Fred Olen Ray
- Produced by: Fred Olen Ray
- Starring: Paul Jones; Marcia Scott; Ray Starr
- Cinematography: Marvin Levine; John Raber; Fred Olen Ray (as Fred Ray)
- Music by: Paul Jones; Sugar Lee; Modest Mussorgsky
- Release date: 1978
- Running time: 55 minutes
- Language: English
- Budget: $298.00

The Brain Leeches is a 1978 American low-budget science fiction exploitation film directed by Fred Olen Ray and starring Paul Jones, Marcia Scott, and Ray Starr. It has a running time of 55 minutes, and was completed on a budget of $298.00. The film was shown publicly only once, although it has since become available through distributors. The project proved to be a turning point in the careers of two of the principals.

== Plot ==
A former nuclear scientist turned pro-wrestler does battle with invading aliens who are taking over the brains of people in a small town.

== Cast ==
- Paul Jones as Dr. John Hayes
- Marcia Scott as Susan
- Ray Starr as Rusty Fender
- Jennifer Knight as Rose
- Brad Linaweaver as Billy Johnson
- Fred Olen Ray (credited as Brian Wolfe) as Tom

== Production ==
=== Filming ===
Principal photography took place in 1978. The film was shot using an old Auricon 16mm camera, and (expired) nine-year-old black and white film stock obtained from an Orlando, Florida, television station where Ray worked. The alien invaders were represented by large rubber ants purchased at a dime store for 19 cents apiece. Earthlings under mind control by the aliens were portrayed as having all-white eyes. The special effect was achieved by applying white tape to the actors' eyelids. The destruction of the alien headquarters (the TV station where Ray worked) was depicted using stock footage of a nuclear explosion from an old 16mm documentary found in the television station's film archive.

=== Score ===
The film score is a public domain recording of Mussorgsky's Pictures at an Exhibition, taken directly from a "cheap record album". According to Ray: "No effort was made to synchronize any of the music to the picture. We just put on a classical record and let it play." Portions of the film were shot at a bar, The Foxhead Tavern, in Orlando.

Production of The Brain Leeches was completed, on budget, for $298.00.

== Distribution ==
In 1991, Ray stated that The Brain Leeches had been shown publicly only one time, and that it would never be released for distribution. However, more than 30 years after its first showing, copies of the film have become available through distributors such as Sinister Cinema.com.

== Legacy ==
The project proved to be a watershed moment for two of the principals. Political essayist Brad Linaweaver received his first original story credit (for film) for The Brain Leeches. The experience changed the trajectory of Linaweaver's career path, emphasizing film and science fiction writing for the rest of his life. The film also jump-started the career of prodigious Hollywood director/producer (and sometimes professional wrestler) Fred Olen Ray, who is also known for having loaned Quentin Tarantino his first 16mm camera to make My Best Friend's Birthday. The association and collaboration between Linaweaver and Ray continued until Linaweaver's death in 2019.
