= Brad Linaweaver =

American novelist (1952–2019)

- Born: Bradford Swain Linaweaver; September 1, 1952; Washington, North Carolina, U.S.
- Died: August 29, 2019 (aged 66); Apopka, Florida, U.S.
- Education: Florida State University; Rollins College (MFA)
- Occupation: Writer
- Writing career
- Genres: Science fiction, fantasy
- Notable work: Moon of Ice
- Website: community.fortunecity.ws./lavendar/ducksoup/393/brad.htm

Bradford Swain Linaweaver (September 1, 1952 – August 29, 2019) was an American science fiction writer, film producer, actor, and magazine publisher. Over a 40-year career, he completed a body of work including novels, short stories, and screenplays.

== Early years and education ==
Brad Linaweaver was born September 1, 1952, in Washington, North Carolina, the only child of Melville and June Linaweaver (née Swain). The family moved to the outskirts of Orlando, Florida in 1958, when Brad was six years old, where his father engaged in real estate development and investments. Linaweaver attended Orange County public schools, before attending Florida State University. He obtained his MFA degree in a program for poets and writers from Rollins College. Although he spent the better part of his career in Hollywood, he eventually settled at the family lake front home in Apopka, which his father designed and built shortly after moving to Florida in 1958.

== Career ==
=== Political essayist ===
In late 1970, during his freshman year at Florida State University, Linaweaver joined the local college chapter of the national conservative organization Young Americans for Freedom (YAF). Both conservative and libertarian ideologies were represented within the local YAF chapter, prompting Linaweaver to begin writing and debating about the various political philosophies competing for followers on college campuses at that time. This eventually led to his first sale to a national publication, a short article The Wish, which made the case for capitalism over socialism. The article appeared in The New Guard, the magazine published by YAF. Subsequent articles in that publication drew the attention of public intellectual, conservative author, and YAF founder William F. Buckley. Linaweaver and Buckley subsequently struck up a friendship and correspondence, which lasted decades until Buckley's death in 2008. Through that relationship, Linaweaver eventually published essays in Buckley's magazine National Review. Unknown to him at the time, Linaweaver's writing also caught the attention of Ronald Reagan. In 1976, Reagan devoted one of his radio show broadcasts to a discussion of The Wish, praising Linaweaver in the process. Reagan summed up his commentary on Linaweaver with the line, "How right he is!" The radio broadcast is included in the Reagan CD set In His Own Voice and in the book Stories in His Own Hand: The Everyday Wisdom of Ronald Reagan. Linaweaver didn't learn about the endorsement from Reagan until decades later. He mused that if he had known about it earlier, it might have changed the trajectory of his career path. "I never would have had my career in Hollywood. I might have been a boring political hack in Washington, trying to capitalize on the Reagan endorsement to be a political speechwriter. I'd be a worse libertarian than I am today." Instead, Linaweaver soon took up writing science fiction, and stories for movies, inserting his libertarian ideology into the works whenever feasible. In a 2007 interview, he noted that "I've been getting libertarian messages into everything for a quarter of a century". But, he observed, not every genre lent itself to his form of political promotionalism. "My involvement with movies has been mostly low-budget, exploitation stuff where ideology is not that relevant. When you're writing science fiction for a New York publisher, you actually achieve something when you slip in a libertarian idea. But with independent, exploitation, low-budget Hollywood, there's already an anti-authoritarian attitude. That culture is by nature fairly libertarian. There's less need to be a propagandist."

=== Film ===
Linaweaver began his film career in 1978 with an original story credit for The Brain Leeches, the film that also jump started the career of prodigious Hollywood director producer (and sometimes professional wrestler) Fred Olen Ray. The Brain Leeches was completed, on budget, for $298.00. His association with Ray continued throughout Linaweaver's life, and included work on Jack-O which Linaweaver wrote and Ray produced, as well as later projects like Super Shark, a 2011 Ray film where Linaweaver was executive producer. Linaweaver's long association with independent film also included writing credits on low budget direct-to-video titles like The Boneyard Collection, Space Babes Meet the Monsters and The Low Budget Time Machine. Linaweaver's association with Ray, and others, led to a number of small acting roles, both uncredited and 16 credited in numerous independent films.

=== Science fiction ===
Linaweaver's first published science fiction sale was in the July 1980 issue of Fantastic with the short story The Competitor, which was later adapted as a radio play and stage production by the Atlanta Radio Theatre Company.

==== Moon of Ice ====
What soon followed is considered Linaweaver's magnum opus, Moon of Ice. It is an alternate history tale that has Nazi Germany being the first to develop an atomic bomb, and using it to defeat the Soviet Union and Great Britain...only to reach a stalemate with the United States, which uses its own atomic bomb to defeat Japan. The work allowed Linaweaver to expound upon the different outcomes of economic models (National Socialism in Germany, Libertarianism in the United States), as well as the little known cultist underpinnings and beliefs of the Nazi regime. The work began in the form of a novella, which soon drew the attention of the science fiction community, resulting in a 1983 nomination for the Nebula Award, and finishing as a finalist in that category. Linaweaver then expanded the story to novel length, firmly establishing himself within the realm of Libertarian science fiction writers, and winning a Prometheus Award. The novel garnered the endorsements of Robert A. Heinlein, Isaac Asimov, Ray Bradbury, and William F. Buckley, Jr. While many reviews praised the handling of economic themes, and Linaweaver's research into the little known cultist beliefs of some Nazi elites (including a Hollow Earth, and a Moon made of ice), some found fault with the story telling, opining that the torrent of information "numbs rather than stimulates".

==== Other novels ====
His novel Sliders, based on the television series of the same name, includes a thorough critique of communism, expanding on ideas Linaweaver first explored in The Wish at the beginning of his career. His other novels include The Land Beyond Summer, four Doom novels with Dafydd ab Hugh, three Battlestar Galactica novels with actor Richard Hatch, and Anarquia with J. Kent Hastings, an alternate history treatment of the Spanish Civil War. The first collection of his short stories was published under the title Clownface.

Over his career, Linaweaver wrote more than 50 stories that found their way into print.

==== Collaborations and awards ====
Linaweaver's 1995 story collaboration with Victor Koman, The Light That Blinds featured an occult battle between Aleister Crowley and Adolf Hitler.

In 1993, Linaweaver's short story Unmerited Favor was published in Mike Resnick's anthology Alternate Warriors.

In 1998, Linaweaver's short story And to the Republic For Which It Stands was published in Harry Turtledove's anthology Alternate Generals. In 2005, his short story A Good Bag was collected in another of Turtledove's anthologies Alternate Generals III.

In 2004, he co-authored Worlds of Tomorrow with former movie magazine editor and film memorabilia collector Forrest J Ackerman. The hardcover coffee table book featured cover art from science fiction's Golden Age, from Ackerman's considerable collection, and included full color reproductions and commentary from the authors.

Linaweaver shared a second Prometheus Award with Ed Kramer for co-editing Free Space, a libertarian science fiction anthology from TOR books.

Several of his short stories received Honorable Mention in The Year's Best Fantasy and Horror by Ellen Datlow. Those stories included The Lon Chaney Factory, Clutter, A Real Babe, and Chump Hoist. The Science Fiction story, Wells of Wisdom made the preliminary Nebula ballot and was part of the Galaxy Audio Project, read by Catherine Oxenberg.

=== Web series ===
Linaweaver also wrote and produced online content, including the award-winning web series Silicon Assassin, starring Richard Hatch, currently available on YouTube.

=== Magazine publishing ===
Linaweaver's many years in Hollywood, and the stories and personalities he had come to know while living there, culminated in the creation of movie magazine Mondo Cult, with Linaweaver as publisher. The magazine featured literary contributions from, and articles about, Linaweaver's eclectic list of celebrity friends and contacts, including Battlestar Galactica actor Richard Hatch; science fiction author and collector Forrest J. Ackerman; the conservative commentator, publisher, and television personality William F. Buckley, Jr.; adult cinema legend Traci Lords and poetry from speculative fiction icon Ray Bradbury and Linaweaver's college friend and YAF colleague, Georgia State Representative Chesley V. Morton. Mondo Cult is edited by former Famous Monsters of Filmland editor, Jessie Lilley.

== Heinlein's brass cannon ==
Linaweaver owned a signaling gun, or small brass cannon, which had originally belonged to science fiction writer Robert A. Heinlein. Heinlein and his wife Virginia, had acquired the cannon in 1964, immediately following the Goldwater campaign. It later provided inspiration for The Brass Cannon which was Heinlein's working title for the 1966 novel which eventually became The Moon is a Harsh Mistress. In that novel, Heinlein refers to the cannon, in a parable implying that self-government is an illusion caused by failure to understand reality. For nearly 30 years, the firing of the brass cannon was a July 4 tradition at the Heinlein residence. Virginia Heinlein retained the cannon after her husband's death in 1988, and it was bequeathed to Linaweaver in her will, after Virginia died in 2003. Linaweaver restored the cannon to working order and subsequently posted a 2007 video of it being fired several times (with very small charges) on YouTube.

== Death ==
Brad Linaweaver, age 66, died August 29, 2019, of cancer at his home in Apopka, Florida.
