= Butch Camp =

- Directed by: Alessandro De Gaetano
- Written by: Alessandro De Gaetano
- Produced by: Steve Gellman; Timothy E. Sabo
- Starring: Paul Denniston; Judy Tenuta; Jason Terisi; Jordan Roberts; Bill Igraham
- Cinematography: Cynthia Webster
- Edited by: Amy Harvey
- Music by: Conrad Pope
- Production company: Billingsgate
- Release date: 14 November 1996 (Reeling Chicago Gay Lesbian Film Festival)
- Running time: 103 minutes
- Country: United States
- Language: English

Butch Camp is a 1996 American comedy film directed by Alessandro De Gaetano, starring Paul Denniston, Judy Tenuta, Jason Terisi, Jordan Roberts and Bill Igraham.

== Plot ==
Matt Grabowski (Paul Denniston) is an awkward young gay man whose life is falling apart. His boyfriend had left him three years earlier for another man. His sex life is reduced to eavesdropping on the exploits of his roommate who also leaves him and takes all the furniture. He is mugged on several occasions and is overworked, underpaid and underappreciated at his job.

Disappointed about his failure to find true love, Matt decides to learn to be more assertive by attending Butch Camp. The boot camp training seminar is overseen by the iron-fisted dominatrix commandant Samantha Rottweiler (Judy Tenuta) who unleashes a series of physically and mentally grueling exercises on her class of gay trainees.

One of his challenges is to survive a night in a sports bar where he meets Janet Cockswell (Jordan Roberts) who mounts a concerted effort to seduce him. He is also drawn to Janet's soon-to-be former boyfriend Rod Cazzone (Jason Terisi) who in turn finds himself strangely attracted to Matt. A love triangle ensues when Matt gains self-confidence and his attractiveness to both Janet and Rod increases.

== Cast ==
- Paul Denniston as Matt Grabowski
- Judy Tenuta as Samantha Rottweiler
- Jason Terisi as Rod Cazzone
- Jordan Roberts as Janet Cockswell
- Bill Igraham as Danny

== Production ==
Alessandro De Gaetano wrote the script in 1991, four years prior to production. Tenuta agreed to do the film after the script was rewritten to enlarge her role. She was labeled as "The Star" in the film's press kit despite her role being secondary. Tenuta's name recognition and the producers staging a reading of scenes from the movie in the spring of 1996 successfully resulted in investors providing the $300,000 needed to complete the project.

The film was shot around Chicago in about a month and was completed on schedule and on budget despite unfavorable weather and a camera breakdown. A rough cut was shown at gay and lesbian film festivals in Chicago and Sydney where it was well received at the former and even more popular at the latter. The producers Sabo and Gellman had to deal directly with movie theatre chains to get domestic distribution due to the lack of financial backing from any of the major Hollywood studios. They selected Sony over Cineplex Odeon for the film's debut in Chicago.

== Reception ==
Marc Savlov of The Austin Chronicle rated the film 3 stars out of 5 and wrote, "Surprisingly touching at times and consistently funny, de Gaetano's film is a hopelessly romantic comedy no matter what your sexual proclivities may be." Lisa Alspector of the Chicago Reader wrote that the film is "a portent of the time when gay lead characters will be plentiful enough that they’re no longer required to be role models or political icons—Matt’s an old-fashioned schlemiel in a half-hokey, half-serious story whose slapstick and reeking scatological humor provide some childish delight." P. Van Vleck of The Video Librarian rated the film 3 stars out of 5 wrote that while the film "suffers from a few adolescent moments", it is "quite funny."

Mark Woods of Variety praised Tenuta's performance, while writing that the film "often feels like a gay version of the sometimes tasteless yet curiously popular British Carry On movies". Achy Obejas of the Chicago Tribune criticised the misogyny of Tenuta's character as well as the characters in the subplots, calling them "obscenely stereotypical, as if drawn not by heterosexuals, but by ignorant, homophobic heterosexuals", and wrote that the film "might have been better, simpler and funnier if they'd just let Denniston and Igraham write their own story, one about friendship, filled with wonderfully bitchy lines and sweet moments." Leslie Rubinkowski of the Pittsburgh Post-Gazette wrote that the "same shallow story and bad acting that infect mainstream movies have trickled down here." Henry Sheehan of The Orange County Register gave the film a negative review. Laura Dempsey of the Dayton Daily News called the film "obvious" and "badly done". Kevin Thomas of the Los Angeles Times wrote that "There's no chemistry between Matt and Janet and even less between him and Rod, despite a sensitive, unself-conscious performance by Terisi" and that "What little edge the film has comes from Rod's constantly confounding the stereotype Matt holds of him as a blue-collar Italian American."
