= Bikini Chain Gang =

2004 American television film

- Written by: Fred Olen Ray
- Directed by: Fred Olen Ray
- Starring: Beverly Lynne; Nicole Sheridan; Jay Richardson; Evan Stone; Belinda Gavin; Peter Spellos; Don Donason; Eric Spudic; Brooke Banner; Jassie; Trevor Zen; Brooke Haven
- Theme music composer: Anthony Francis
- Country of origin: United States
- Original language: English

Production
- Producer: Kimberly A. Ray
- Cinematography: T. Max Montgomery
- Editor: Edward Torres
- Running time: 80 minutes
- Production company: American Independent Productions

Original release
- Release: 2004

Bikini Chain Gang is a 2004 American made for cable women in prison erotic film written and directed by Fred Olen Ray (under the pseudonym name Nicholas Juan Medina).

== Plot ==
Jessie is accused of theft and, although she is innocent, she is sent for 5 years in prison. There, all female inmates are dressed in bikinis and subject to constant sexual harassment by the guards.

== Production ==
The film was produced by American Independent Productions and distributed by Image Entertainment and New City Releasing.

== Release ==
It was broadcast Cinemax and Showtime.

=== Home video ===
It was released as double feature with Bikini Airways in 2005.

== Reception ==
The film is considered part of a cult softcore bikini informal film series, all directed by Ray. According to Marc Blake in his book about comedy, the comedic dimension of the film is not intentional.

It was rated 8 out of 10 by the B-movie blog Tarstarkas.net.
