= Supercock =

- Directed by: Gus Trikonis
- Written by: Leland Lando Lilly; Gus Trikonis
- Screenplay by: Michael Laton
- Produced by: Lettie B. Soriano; Fred C. Soriano Jr.; Gail Wayne
- Starring: Ross Hagen; Nancy Kwan
- Cinematography: Fred C. Soriano Jr.
- Edited by: Gervacio I. Santos
- Music by: Tito Soto
- Production company: Hagen-Wayne Film Organization
- Distributed by: Troma Entertainment
- Release date: 1975
- Running time: 90 minutes
- Country: Philippines
- Language: English

Supercock (also known as Bet to Kill and A Fistful of Feathers) is a 1975 comedy film directed by Gus Trikonis and starring Ross Hagen. The film also stars Nancy Kwan.

Seeing as the original title was rather controversial, the film has been released under several different names, the most notable being A Fistful of Feathers.

== Plot ==
An American cowboy and his prized pet rooster, Friendly, travel to the Philippines to enter the First International Cockfighting Olympics and for a chance to win $100,000.

== Cast ==
- Ross Hagen - Seth Calhoun
- Nancy Kwan - Yuki Chan
