= Inner Sanctum 2 =

- DVD cover
- Directed by: Fred Olen Ray
- Written by: Fred Olen Ray, Steve Armogida
- Produced by: Alan Amiel
- Starring: Michael Nouri; Sandahl Bergman; Margaux Hemingway; David Warner
- Cinematography: Hanania Baer
- Edited by: Stephen Eckelberry
- Music by: Chuck Cirino
- Production company: MDP Worldwide
- Distributed by: Columbia TriStar Home Video
- Release date: November 30, 1994
- Running time: 82 minutes
- Country: United States
- Language: English

Inner Sanctum 2 is a 1994 American erotic thriller film directed by Fred Olen Ray and starring Tracy Brooks Swope, Michael Nouri, Sandahl Bergman, Margaux Hemingway, and David Warner. The film is a sequel of Inner Sanctum and follows a story of the woman who, after killing her husband in self-defense, is targeted by his family while a murderer also stalks her. The film is filled with a tense atmosphere, elements of mysticism and eroticism, exploring the themes of guilt, fear and attempts to overcome psychological trauma.

== Plot ==
The main character, Jennifer Reed, is on the verge of a nervous breakdown after she was forced to kill her husband in self-defense, who attempted to kill her. This tragedy caused serious mental trauma to Jennifer, and now she has a nightmare every night in which her husband haunts her.

Jennifer is trying to start a new life, but her late husband's relatives are trying to sue for part of his property, putting additional pressure on her. At the same time, the woman struggles with her fears and the feeling that dead secrets from the past are not letting go. The situation is aggravated by the appearance of a mysterious stranger, who increasingly threatens her mind and safety.

== Cast ==
- Tracy Brooks Swope as Jennifer Reed
- Michael Nouri as Bill Reed
- Sandahl Bergman as Sharon Reed
- Margaux Hemingway as Anna Rawlins
- David Warner as Dr. Lamont
- Robert Quarry as Steve Warren
