= Ghost in a Teeny Bikini =

2006 American television film

- Written by: Fred Olen Ray
- Directed by: Fred Olen Ray
- Starring: Christine Nguyen; Nicole Sheridan; Alexandre Boisvert; Brad Bartram; Evan Stone; Rebecca Love; Syren; Michelle Lay
- Theme music composer: Anthony Francis
- Country of origin: United States
- Original language: English

Production
- Producer: Kimberly A. Ray
- Cinematography: Max Thornburg
- Running time: 84 minutes
- Production company: American Independent Productions

Original release
- Release: August 21, 2006

Ghost in a Teeny Bikini is a 2006 American made for cable erotic film directed by Fred Olen Ray.

== Plot ==
While shooting for a film directed by her boyfriend, Ted Wood Jr., Muffin Baker learns from a telegram that her rich uncle, Cyrus, has died. Together they travel to the estate of the deceased, where her last will is to be read. The lawyer, Archibald Weisenheimer, and her daughter, Evilyn, put plans together to murder Muffin Baker and claim the inheritance for themselves. Unknown to them, however, the property is haunted by the ghost of Tabitha, who becomes friendly to Muffin Baker and helps her. Weisenheimer tries desperately to kill the heir, leaving Evilyn to sleep with Ted.

In the last testament of the late Uncle Cyrus, it is revealed that a box of his assets and the associated key were hidden in his property. Muffin then returns to her room to take a nap. In her dreams, the ghost of Tabitha appears and seduces her. After her nap, Muffin realizes where she has to look for the chest and the key. However, when Weisenheimer and Evilyn threaten to steal the money, Tabitha reappears and saves Muffin. Weisenheimer confesses that he murdered Muffin's uncle. A policeman, fetched by Ted, arrives to arrest Weisenheimer. Ted and Muffin finally forgive each other.

== Cast ==
- Christine Nguyen as Muffin Baker
- Nicole Sheridan as Tabitha, The Ghost
- Alexandre Boisvert as Ted Wood Jr.
- Brad Bartram as Archibald Weisenheimer
- Evan Stone as Marsh
- Rebecca Love as Evilyn
- Syren as Madame Zola
- Michelle Lay as Fuscia

== Background ==
The film was produced by the production company American Independent Productions. The film was shot simultaneously with Bikini Girls from the Lost Planet. It was broadcast several times in Summer 2006 at fixed times and on demand on the premium channel Cinemax. It was released on DVD on August 6, 2006.

The building, in which a large part of the film was shot, also served as a filming location for the movie Voodoo Dollz.

== Reception ==
Dr. Gore's Movie Reviews praised the film for its humor and the variety of the three songs. The humorous songs and Evan Stone's role were also evaluated positively, but Christine Nguyen was identified as the best actress in the film in a DVD Talk review. The film was given 8 out of 10 at tarstarkas.net.

Mitch Lovell of The Video Vacuum, however, had a rather negative assessment of the film. He said that the sex scenes were mostly terrible. Unlike other critics, he also criticized the songs as a particularly low point.
