= Quiet Riot: Well Now You're Here =

2015 film by Regina Russell

Quiet Riot: Well Now You're Here, There's No Way Back
- Directed by: Regina Russell Banali
- Written by: Regina Russell Banali
- Produced by: Regina Russell Banali
- Edited by: Kelly McCoy
- Distributed by: Double R Films
- Release dates: April 29, 2014 (Newport Beach); January 29, 2015
- Running time: 104 minutes
- Country: United States
- Language: English

Quiet Riot: Well Now You're Here, There's No Way Back is a 2014 documentary film about Los Angeles–based heavy metal and hair metal band Quiet Riot. The film was directed by former actress Regina Russell Banali. It premiered at the 2014 Newport Beach Film Festival and won the Festival Honors award for "Outstanding Achievement in Filmmaking" in the music category. It was screened out of competition at the 2015 Cannes Film Festival and aired on January 29, 2015, on Showtime.

== Critical reception ==
Indiewire called it "an enthralling ride".

== Awards ==
- Festival Honors Award for "Outstanding Achievement in Filmmaking" in the music category Newport Beach Film Festival

== Distribution ==
The film had its film festival premier at the 2014 Newport Beach Film Festival and world premiered on the Showtime Network January 29, 2015.
