= Judy Tenuta =

American comedian (1949–2022)

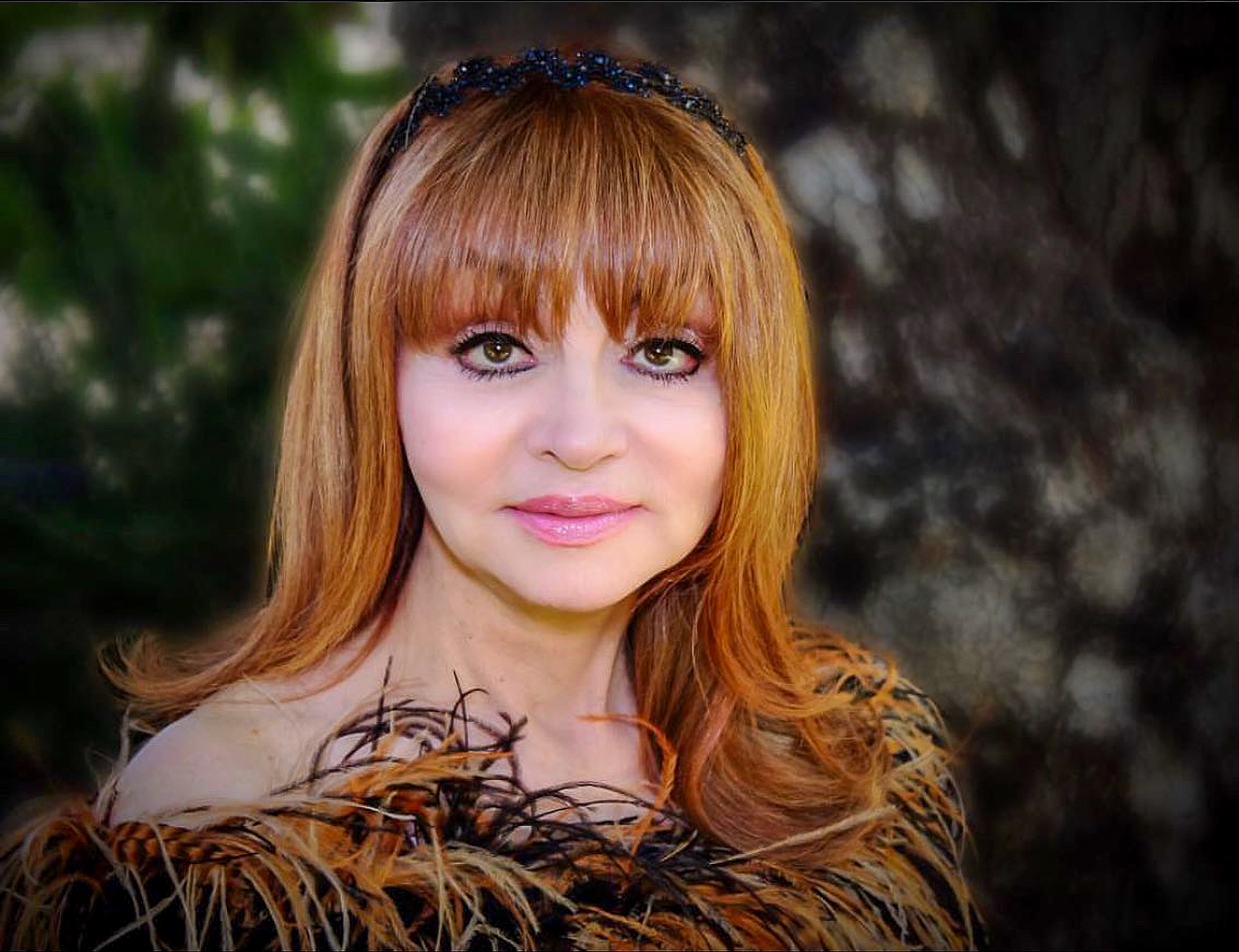
- Tenuta in 2018
- Born: Judy Lynn Tenuta; November 7, 1949; Oak Park, Illinois, U.S.
- Died: October 6, 2022 (aged 72); Studio City, California, U.S.

Comedy career
- Years active: 1971–2022
- Medium: Stand-up; television; music; film
- Genres: Satire; observational comedy; insult comedy; camp
- Subjects: Catholicism; current events; American politics; popular culture; religion
- Website: judytenuta.com

Judy Lynn Tenuta (November 7, 1949 – October 6, 2022) was an American comedian, actress, and comedy musician. She was known for her whimsical and brash persona of "The Love Goddess", mixing insult comedy, observational humor, self-promotion, and bawdy onstage antics. Throughout her career, Tenuta built a niche but devoted following, particularly among members of the LGBTQ community. Tenuta wrote two comedy books, and received two nominations for the Grammy Award for Best Comedy Album.

== Early life ==
One of nine siblings, Tenuta was born in Oak Park, Illinois, on November 7, 1949, (Note: Tenuta had claimed she was born in 1956, and her real age and birth year were confirmed by her publicist after her death.) into a Catholic family to a Polish mother, Johanna Z. "Yanya" Tenuta, and an Italian father, Caesar Tenuta.

She graduated from Immaculate Heart of Mary High School in Westchester, Illinois, and attended the University of Illinois at Chicago where she majored in theater. Her interest in comedy began when she took an improv comedy class with the Chicago improv group The Second City. Shortly thereafter, she started opening for other comedians in Chicago.

== Career ==
=== Comedy career ===
Tenuta began her comedy career performing openers and small time shows on the Chicago comedy circuit in the 1970s. During her first performance, Tenuta shocked audiences by dressing up as the Virgin Mary, and after being encouraged by her friends to incorporate an accordion into her routine, she began to develop the character into her iconic persona as the wisecracking "Love Goddess".

After building a fiery reputation as one of the "hottest young comics around", Tenuta left Chicago and moved to New York City to host an HBO comedy special with Ellen DeGeneres, Rita Rudner, and Paula Poundstone. By the late 1980s, Tenuta uprooted again, moving to Los Angeles, where she published her book Full Frontal Tenudity about life in Hollywood. During her time in Los Angeles, Tenuta harbored a fiercely independent attitude, openly rejecting Hollywood beauty standards and celebrity life. She continued to perform on national tours for years afterwards, making special visits to the Chicago circuit.

=== Other ventures ===
Tenuta's use of her voice in her stand-up act lent itself to voice-over work in several animated programs. This included doing the voice of Edna on Duckman, Munch Kelly on Cow and Chicken in the banned episode "Buffalo Gals", Black Widow on Space Ghost Coast to Coast, a foul-mouthed mermaid in Johnny Bravo, Queen Porcina in Mighty Magiswords and as herself in Dr. Katz, Professional Therapist. She appeared in numerous film and television roles, including the dominatrix disciplinarian "Samantha Rottweiler" in Butch Camp, and the loud-mouthed librarian "Mrs. Holler" in Ned's Declassified School Survival Guide. She also played various minor characters on The Weird Al Show, was featured in many of "Weird Al" Yankovic's comedy shorts and music videos, and appeared in dozens of other minor acting roles.

In addition to her small screen acting, Tenuta had various theatrical roles, most notably in The Vagina Monologues and Menopause the Musical. Tenuta wrote two comedy books Full Frontal Tenudity and The Power of Judyism, and released five comedy CDs, receiving "Best Comedy Album" Grammy nominations for Attention Butt-Pirates and Lesbetarians! and In Goddess We Trust. She gained some mainstream notoriety for a series of television ads for MTV and Diet Dr Pepper in the late 1980s, as well as her HBO, Showtime, and Lifetime specials.

- 1986: Tenuta appeared on British TV comedy show Saturday Live.
- 1986–1990: She made several guest appearances on the show of her favorite comedian, Joan Rivers.
- 1987: She became nationally known in her first HBO special Women of the Night, costarring Ellen DeGeneres, Paula Poundstone, and Rita Rudner.
- 1988: She won Best Female Stand-Up Comic at The American Comedy Awards
- 1987–1988: She toured across the country with another of her favorite comedians, comedy legend George Carlin.
- 1988–1995: Frequent guest on morning radio show Howard Stern.
- 1988: She became the "Spokes-Goddess" for a series of "Diet Dr. Pepper" commercials, and also filmed her second HBO special.
- 1991: She published her first book, The Power of Judyism, following up with an audio CD version in 1999.
- 1994: She was nominated for her first Grammy, for her comedy CD Attention Butt Pirates and Lesbetarians.
- 1995: Tenuta was nominated for her second Grammy, for her comedy CD In Goddess We Trust.
- 1996: Tenuta appeared as a drill sergeant, Sam Rottweiler, training gay men to defend themselves against bullies in the film Butch Camp.
- 1998: She conceived, produced, and starred in the film Desperation Boulevard, which was directed and written by Greg Glienna of Meet the Parents fame.
- 2001: Tenuta appeared on The View, dishing with Joy Behar, Star Jones, and Barbara Walters.
- 2005: Tenuta appeared in 2005 film Flirting with Anthony, as Jayleen the Motel Lady.
- 2007: She made a guest appearance as Mrs. Holler, the librarian, on Ned's Declassified School Survival Guide.
- 2011: She played Zinnia, a menacing, aging actress, in the independent film Going Down in LA-LA Land, and the Mother Nun in the independent horror comedy Sister Mary. She would go on to be nominated for Best Actress at the 2012 Laugh or Die Comedy Fest for her performance.

== Stand up routine ==
=== Persona ===
Tenuta's act was primarily structured around an exaggerated, campy, and offbeat persona that was referred to primarily as "The Love Goddess". She also styled herself with other monikers including "The Petite Flower", "Aphrodite of the Accordion", "Fashion-Plate Saint", "Queen of Candy-Pants", "Princess of Panty Shields", "Empress of Elvis Impersonators", and the "Buffer of Foreheads". Her routine, which blended observational and insult humor, was a performance of "surreal lunacy". "The Love Goddess" began every show with her signature greeting "Hi, Pigs!" before diving into a bawdy, chaotic, and whimsical whirlwind of stories, impressions, and songs. One review of a 1987 performance reported that Tenuta's show was a veritable "onslaught" of "atavistic growlings and gum-chewing bimbo stances", filled with "little nasties", crass jokes, and "political offensiveness".

Tenuta often performed in an array of fantastical costumes made up of "Aphrodite dresses, feather boots, and gauzy capes" and with a variety of props, including her iconic accordion.

=== Content and delivery ===
Tenuta's unique blend of observational and insult humor drew heavily from the Borscht Belt and Vaudeville comedy styles. As "The Love Goddess", Tenuta regularly lampooned religion, politics, celebrities, sports, and current events. Most of Tenuta's content passed through the filter of her faux religion "Judyism", which, in her own words, aimed to "help you forget about your problems and think about mine for a change". Throughout her act, Judy continuously worked to convince the women in her audience to convert to Judyism, and bloom into Love Goddesses themselves.

Although the demeanor was fanciful, her content had serious undertones. In a 2007 interview, Tenuta explained that she used over-the-top comedy to express her own anger at the world around her, saying "When I get angry about something, I have to make it into a joke. The thing with comedy is it relieves the pressure of tragedy. That's why people come [to see me]." Giovanna Del Negro, a scholar who has studied and written about Tenuta's career, argued that "in juxtaposing the idealized love-goddess image with the aggressive, over-the-top dominatrix persona, we discover that play acting [in Tenuta's performances], no matter how ludicrous, can provide a terrain for interrogating issues of gender, power, and sexuality, and gives those who do it an opportunity to think beyond predetermined social categories." Del Negro contended that "by immersing [themselves] in a world of this tender blossom with the brassy voice, queers of all kinds—gay, lesbian, bisexual, transgender, or, more broadly, anyone with a non-normative gender performance—can bask in the loving glow of the material goddess and joyously perform their difference without fear of reprisal or judgment."

=== Audience interaction ===
Tenuta's performances were renowned for a high level of audience interaction and participation. She was known for picking on audience members, making them targets of her jokes and roping them into on-stage antics. One 1996 show review by The Chicago Tribune detailed a performance Tenuta gave in her home town in which she performed especially unconventional comic routines, including: ordering a pizza directly to herself on stage and having the local pizza delivery man feed it to her; performing a "fertility dance" over the "prostrate" figure of the club's booker; and having her own mother "forced to feed pickled weiners to 'stud puppets [scantily clad men].'" She even convinced 'two large and seemingly conservative suburban gentlemen to engage in a peculiar and obscene dance with clown wigs, a set of fake breasts, and large inflatable phallus." Tenuta was especially known for bringing male audience members onto stage, and shoving her used gum into their mouths.

== Gay rights ==
Tenuta was an outspoken advocate for gay rights and amassed a faithful following in the LGBT community. During the early years of her career, Tenuta frequently performed at gay bars and clubs around Chicago, and continued to perform at Gay Pride festivals and events across the country until her death. Tenuta publicly stated that she always felt welcomed and supported by the gay community, and even offered on her official website to officiate same-sex marriages.

== Death ==
Tenuta died in Studio City, California, on October 6, 2022, at the age of 72, from stage 4 ovarian cancer, with which she had been diagnosed in 2020. At the time of her death she had been in a relationship, since 2008, with Vern Pang. She was survived by Pang, six siblings, and extended family. She is interred at Hollywood Forever Cemetery.

== Discography ==
- 1987: Buy This, Pigs! (Elektra Records)
- 1994: Attention, Butt Pirates and Lesbetarians - Live at the C.S.W. Gay Pride Festival (Goddess Records)
- 1995: In Goddess We Trust (Gag MEdia)
- 1997: The Power of Judyism (Goddess Records)
- 2002: A Space Goddessy (laugh.com)
- 2008: The Best of Judy Tenuta: Buy This Again, Pigs! (self-released)
