= Warlords (film) =

- Film poster
- Directed by: Fred Olen Ray
- Written by: Scott Ressler
- Starring: David Carradine
- Release date: 1988
- Running time: 87 minutes
- Country: United States
- Language: English

Warlords is a 1988 American post-apocalyptic film directed by Fred Olen Ray starring David Carradine. The film was written by Scott Ressler.

== Premise ==
Dow is an ex-soldier searching the wasteland for his wife who was taken from him by the Warlord. With only a disembodied, wisecracking head and a renegade woman named Danny as his companions, they roam the terrain to try and get back the woman Dow lost.

== Cast ==
- David Carradine as Dow
- Dawn Wildsmith as Danny
- Sid Haig as The Warlord
- Ross Hagen as Beaumont
- Fox Harris as Colonel Cox
- Robert Quarry as Dr. Mathers
- Brinke Stevens as Dow's Wife
- Victoria Sellers as Desert Girl
- Sam Hiona as Frank
- Cleve Hall as "Badger"
- Debra Lamb as Harem Girl (credited as Deborah Lamb)
- Michelle Bauer as Harem Girl (credited as Michelle McLelland)
- Greta Gibson as Harem Girl
- Patti Bodman as Harem Girl
- Judy Ashton as Harem Girl
- Renee Arnold as Harem Girl

== Reception ==
The website Moira Reviews stated that Warlords was "a bad rip-off of Mad Max 2. The action scenes are dire – people jump off cliffs before the explosions that are meant to throw them go off, others stand still for people to turn around and shoot them. There is an extremely bad creature in a bag effect that is accompanied by an unbelievably annoying squeaky voice over." John McCarthy, in his book about B-movies, found that "No word can describe how bad it was."
