= Voodoo Dollz =

2008 American erotic film directed by Fred Olen Ray

- Written by: Fred Olen Ray
- Directed by: Fred Olen Ray
- Starring: Christine Nguyen; Beverly Lynne; Monique Parent; Charlie Laine; Nicole Sheridan; Alexandre Boisvert; Syren; Kitty Katzu; Michelle Bauer
- Theme music composer: Anthony Francis
- Country of origin: United States
- Original language: English

Production
- Producer: Kimberly A. Ray
- Cinematography: Molly McClintock
- Editor: Dean McKendrick
- Running time: 79 minutes
- Production company: American Independent Productions

Original release
- Release: December 4, 2008

Voodoo Dollz aka Voodoo Dollx: Lust Potion#9 and Costume Doll is a 2008 American made-for-cable erotic comedy film written and directed by Fred Olen Ray (under the pseudonym name Nicholas Juan Medina).

== Plot ==
At the Collin Sport School for Girls, Miss Anton catches Christina sleeping with her classmate Meg. As a result, Christina is sent to the Dunwich School for Girls to share a room with a student named Maria. Together they make friends with two more students, Jilly and Sandra. Miss Santana, the teacher, meets up with Miss Dambahla, a servant of Pakumba, and a caretaker named Jeff. Since Maria and Jeff are so much in love, she has to share her secret not only with Jeff, but also with the other girls. Maria's family is practicing voodoo, so she creates a voodoo doll for each of the girls in order to torture them. Just as Jilly is about to be sent over a cliff to her death by Maria's voodoo magic, Jeff arrives at the last second to save her.

Christina is later caught and tied to a cross. The four women, Miss Santana, Miss Dambahla, Miss Anton and Maria, attempt to burn Christina at the stake. At that moment Jeff notices what's going on and comes charging in to Christina's rescue. He then sets the entire temple on fire, killing off the four evil women.

== Cast ==
- Christine Nguyen as Christina
- Beverly Lynne as Jilly
- Monique Parent as Miss Dambahla
- Charlie Laine as Maria
- Nicole Sheridan as Sandra
- Alexandre Boisvert as Jeff
- Syren as Miss Santana
- Kitty Katzu as Megan "Meg"
- Michelle Bauer as Miss Anton

== Background ==
The film was produced by American Independent Productions and distributed by Retromedia Entertainment. It was broadcast several times in December 2008 on the premium channel Cinemax, and was available on demand. It was released on DVD on January 29, 2009.

The building, which serves as a set for the Dunwich School for Girls, was also used as a backdrop in Fred Olen Ray's 2006 film Ghost in a Teeny Bikini.

== Reception ==
The film was given 2.5 points out of ten by Imdb.com.
