= Beverly Lynne =

American actress (born 1973)

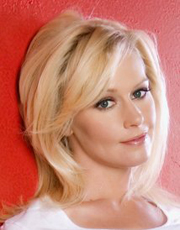
- Beverly Lynne
- Born: October 31, 1973 (age 52); Sellersville, Pennsylvania, U.S.
- Other names: Beverly Lynn, Beverly Lynne Meadows
- Occupation: Actress
- Years active: 2001–present

Beverly Lynne is an American actress who is mainly showcased in erotic film.

== Life and career ==
After attending Pennridge High School in Perkasie, Pennsylvania, she attended college. She was a cheerleader for the Philadelphia Eagles from 1998 to 2000.

During her time in college, she had appeared in Playboy's “Book of Lingerie” (March/April 1997 and March/April 1999), and her picture was printed on the cover of the cheerleading team's swimsuit-calendar. Later, she moved to Los Angeles to start working in the film business as an actress. She began her acting career in The Zombie Chronicles in 2001 and soon had appearances in Holy Terror, Terror Tunes, MadTV and several commercials. After receiving the offer to play a leading part in Playboy TV's Personals 2: CasualSex.com she started appearing in several erotic movies airing in the late night hours of Cinemax, HBO, Showtime and others. Basing on her various roles in this genre she started using the title “Queen of Late Nite”. Cinemax's TV show Hollywood Sexcapades featured her together with her husband. She also appeared in recurring roles on 7 Lives Xposed as Bess, Black Tie Nights as Candi and the 2007 here! original series The Lair, playing "Laura".

Together with her husband she started her own business “BackUp Plan Productions” in 2007. They produced the web show Tanya X based on the character with the same name from the movie The Girl from B.I.K.I.N.I.. Meanwhile, the show was aired on Showtime. The company's first movie to be released is The Atonement of Janis Drake which was shown at PollyGrind Film Festival in 2011.

=== Personal life ===
Lynne is married to fellow actor Glen Meadows.

== Selected filmography ==
- The Love Machine (2016)
- The Big Bust Theory (2013)
- Voodoo Dolls, directed by Fred Olen Ray (2008)
- Bikini Royale, directed by Fred Olen Ray (2008)
- Bikini Royale 2, directed by Fred Olen Ray (2010)
- The Girl from B.I.K.I.N.I, directed by Fred Olen Ray (2007)
- Bikini Chain Gang, directed by Fred Olen Ray (2005)
- The Good, the Bad & the Beautiful, directed by Fred Olen Ray (2005)
- Dangerous Sex Games (2005)
- Curse of the Erotic Tiki, directed by Fred Olen Ray (2004)
