= Bikini Jones and the Temple of Eros =

2010 television film directed by Fred Olen Ray

- Based on: Indiana Jones by George Lucas
- Written by: Fred Olen Ray
- Directed by: Fred Olen Ray (as Nicholas Medina)
- Starring: Christine Nguyen; Heather Vandeven; Ted Newsom; Rebecca Love; Frankie Cullen
- Theme music composer: Anthony Francis
- Country of origin: United States
- Original language: English

Production
- Producer: Kimberly A. Ray
- Cinematography: T. Max Montgomery
- Editor: Dean McKendrick
- Running time: 82 minutes
- Production company: Retromedia Entertainment

Original release
- Release: March 2, 2010

Bikini Jones and the Temple of Eros is a 2010 American made-for-cable comedy erotic film written and directed by Fred Olen Ray (under the pseudonym name Nicholas Juan Medina). It is a porn spoof of Indiana Jones.

== Plot ==
Dr. Bikini Jones, an archaeologist, steals the Golden Idol which happens to be the key to a mysterious place called the Temple of Eros. Legend has it that anyone who discovers the Tiara of Ayesha in that temple becomes the supreme ruler of the country Moronica. Jones must prevail against her adversary, Evilla Cruella, to get to the tiara.

== Cast ==
- Christine Nguyen as Dr. Bikini Jones
- Heather Vandeven as Evilla Cruella
- Ted Newsom as Mr. Martin
- Rebecca Love as Carol
- Frankie Cullen as Drago
- Billy Chappell as Mark X
- Brynn Tyler as Security Guard
- Jayden Cole as Party Girl

== Release ==
The film was produced by the production company Retromedia Entertainment. It was broadcast several times in fall 2010 at fixed times and on demand on the premium channel Cinemax. It was released on DVD on March 2, 2010. It was the subject of controversy when Apple allowed a Cinemax app on iTunes, despite its own policy of keeping pornographic material off its app store.

== Reception ==
DVD Verdict made special note that the film used communicable disease as a plot device. The film was awarded 8 out of 10 points by Tarstarkas.net.
