= Night Creature =

1978 American horror film by Lee Madden

- Directed by: Lee Madden
- Screenplay by: Hugh Smith
- Produced by: Ross Hagen
- Starring: Donald Pleasence; Nancy Kwan; Ross Hagen; Jennifer Rhodes
- Cinematography: Permphol Cheyaroon
- Edited by: Martin Dreffke
- Music by: Jim Helms
- Distributed by: Dimension Pictures
- Release date: 1978
- Country: United States
- Language: English

Night Creature (also known as Out of the Darkness) is a 1978 American horror film directed by Lee Madden and starring Donald Pleasence and Nancy Kwan. The screenplay was by Hugh Smith. Its plot follows a group of visitors on an island who are stalked by a vicious leopard that a big-game hunter has let loose to hunt.

== Cast ==
- Donald Pleasence as Alex McGregor
- Nancy Kwan as Leslie
- Ross Hagen as Ross
- Lesly Fine as Peggy
- Jennifer Rhodes as Georgia
- Prakit Yaungsri as Tom
