= Bikini a Go-Go =

2004 American television film

- Written by: Fred Olen Ray; (as Sherman Scott)
- Directed by: Fred Olen Ray; (as Nicholas Medina)
- Starring: Beverly Lynne; Stacy Burke; Jay Richardson; Cailey Taylor; Danny Pape; Nikki Fritz
- Theme music composer: Anthony Francis
- Original language: English

Production
- Producer: Anthony Francis
- Running time: 87 minutes
- Production company: American Independent Productions

Original release
- Release: July 2, 2004

Bikini a Go-Go is a 2004 American made-for-cable erotic film directed by Fred Olen Ray. It is also known by the alternate name Curse of the Erotic Tiki.

== Plot ==
Brad runs a surf shop on the beach and is in a relationship with Janet. Brad gives his girlfriend an anniversary gift: a tiki amulet that causes seemingly sexual desires for the wearer. Unknown to them, however, the amulet actually belongs to the evil sorceress, Darvella, who does everything she can to steal it back for herself.

== Background ==
The film was produced by the production company American Independent Productions and is distributed by Retromedia Entertainment. It was broadcast several times in Summer 2005 at fixed times and on demand on the premium channels Cinemax and Showtime.

The use of the names "Brad" and "Janet" appears to be an obvious reference to the infamous film The Rocky Horror Picture Show, which featured a couple named Brad and Janet in pivotal roles.

== Reception ==
The Video Vacuum gave the film three stars and praised addition to the general performance of the actors, especially the first scene of the movie with Stacy Burke and Cailey Taylor. In addition, positive evaluations were given by Dr. Gore's Movie Reviews.
