= Visions of Passion =

- Written by: Felicia Conrad
- Directed by: Randall St. George
- Starring: Mia Zottoli; Regina Russell; Mark Weiler; Noah Frank; George Saunders; Ann Marie Rios; Glen Meadows; Arthur Dix; Everett Rodd; Krystal; Carol; Robert James; Kellie Marie; Angel Cassidy; Natalie Moore
- Theme music composer: Flankstaff; Jackson
- Country of origin: United States
- Original language: English

Production
- Producer: Pat Siciliano
- Cinematography: Howard Wexler
- Running time: 85 minutes
- Production company: Rosebud Films

Original release
- Release: 2003

Visions of Passion is a 2003 American made for cable erotic drama film directed by Randall St. George.

== Plot ==
A filmmaker spies on her neighbors.

== Cast ==
- Mia Zottoli as Jeanie (credited as Ava Lake)
- Regina Russell Banali as Alice (credited as Regina Russell)
- Natallie Moore as Lucy (credited as Natalie Moore)
- Mark Weiler as Scotty (credited as Matt Wilde)
- Noah Frank as Larry
- George Saunders as Baker
- Ann Marie Rios as Chrissy (credited as Ann Marie)
- Glen Meadows as Chrissy's Boyfriend
- Arthur Dix as Fred
- Everett Rodd as Video Director
- Krystal as Diane
- Carol as Diane's Girlfriend
- Robert James as Senator Adams
- Kelle Marie as Video Girl (credited as Kellemarie)
- Angel Cassidy as Video Girl

== Background ==
The film was produced by the production company Rosebud Films and distributed by Silhouette Entertainment Group. It was broadcast several times in Summer 2003 at fixed times and on demand on the premium channel Showtime. It was released on DVD on December 7, 2004.

== Reception ==
The film was given 1.5 out of 4 by Dr. Gore's Movie Reviews.
