= Forbidden Sins =

1999 film by Robert Angelo

- Directed by: Robert Angelo
- Written by: Daryl Haney; Hel Styverson
- Starring: Shannon Tweed; Amy Lindsay; Corbin Timbrook
- Cinematography: Michael Goi
- Edited by: William Derbyshire
- Music by: Herman Beeftink
- Distributed by: Notorious Pictures
- Release date: 18 April 1999
- Running time: 90 min
- Country: USA
- Language: English

Forbidden Sins is an erotic thriller film directed by Robert Angelo. Released in 1999, it stars Shannon Tweed and Amy Lindsay.

== Cast ==
- Shannon Tweed as Maureen Doherty
- Corbin Timbrook as David Mulholland
- Kirstine Carlstrand as Virginia Hill
- Timothy Vahle as Brian Armstrong
- Amy Lindsay as Molly Malone
- Myles O'Brien as John Doherty
