= Dinosaur Island (1994 film) =

1994 film by Jim Wynorski and Fred Olen Ray

- Film poster
- Directed by: Fred Olen Ray; Jim Wynorski
- Written by: Bob Sheridan; Christopher Wooden
- Produced by: Fred Olen Ray; Jim Wynorski
- Starring: Ross Hagen; Richard Gabai; Antonia Dorian
- Cinematography: Gary Graver
- Edited by: Wayne Schmidt
- Music by: Chuck Cirino
- Production companies: Win-Ray Media; American Independent Productions; Curb/Esquire Films
- Distributed by: Image Entertainment
- Release date: 1994
- Running time: 95 minutes
- Country: United States
- Language: English
- Budget: $190,000

Dinosaur Island is a 1994 B-movie directed by Fred Olen Ray and Jim Wynorski. Wynorski called it "a very 1950s type of picture, like The Lost Continent except that we're going to have better dinosaurs and more girls."

== Plot ==
A U.S. Army captain is flying three misfit deserters home for a court martial when the airplane has engine trouble and they crash-land in the ocean near an uncharted island. There they find a primitive society of cavewomen who routinely sacrifice virgins to appease "The Great One", the top-dog dinosaur on the island. Mistaken for gods as part of a prophecy, the men must destroy "The Great One" or face death, but meanwhile they fall in love despite the advice of their Queen, who tries to dissuade them from being corrupted by the outsiders' ways.

== Cast ==
- Ross Hagen as Captain Jason Briggs
- Richard Gabai as John Skeemer
- Antonia Dorian as April
- Griffin Drew as May (credited as Griffen Drew)
- Michelle Bauer as June
- Peter Spellos as "Turbo"
- Tom Shell as Wayne Kincaid
- Steve Barkett as Sergeant Ben Healey
- Bob Sheridan as "Buzz"
- Toni Naples as Queen Morganna
- Nikki Fritz as High Priestess
- Robin Chaney as Tara
- Becky LeBeau as Virgin Sacrifice
- Wendy Griffen as Warrior Girl
- Deborah Dutch as Cave Girl (credited as Debra Dare)

== Production ==
Wynorski said that Roger Corman asked him and Fred Olen Ray to make the film after Jurassic Park came out. "It wasn't so much a Jurassic Park rip off as a cavewoman movie", Wynorski said.

Wynorski and Ray said they rewrote the script entirely. They knew who they were going to cast, employing actors they had worked with before, and tailored the script accordingly. They based the characters of the soldiers on characters in Stripes. Another influence was The War that Time Forgot, part of the Star Spangled War Stories comic book series.

The movie was shot at Vasquez Rocks and David Carradine's ranch at Sun Valley over ten days. Wynorski says he and Ray made it "on a wing and a prayer".

Several of the dinosaur props, namely the Deinonychus pet of the tribe and the antagonistic Great One were reused and refurbished from the previous year's film, Carnosaur, which Corman had produced.

Wynorski later said, "I'd never co-directed a movie before, but it was smooth sailing all the way. When one of us got tired, the other would take over. I'd usually go back to the comfort of the air-conditioned motor home and hang out with the girls. You really can't beat that."

== Reception ==
"Roger ended up hating the movie," said Wynorski. "He didn't think the girls in it were pretty and he thought the story was too campy. But it did really well." The film performed better on television than on video.

Wynorski says he was at a party when he met Joe Pesci who told him he loved the film, saying "everytime I watch it I feel like I want to go there." Paste listed the film among the 100 Best B Movies of all time (#56).

== See also ==
- List of films featuring dinosaurs
