= Action U.S.A. =

1989 film by John Stewart

- VHS cover
- Directed by: John Stewart
- Screenplay by: David Reskin
- Story by: David Reskin; John Stewart
- Produced by: Alan Stewart; Susan K. Stewart
- Starring: Barri Murphy; Gregory Scott Cummins; William Hubbard Knight; William Smith; Cameron Mitchell; Ross Hagen
- Cinematography: Thomas L. Callaway
- Edited by: Gabrielle Gilbert Reeves
- Music by: Del Casher
- Production companies: Stewart & Berger
- Distributed by: Imperial Entertainment (U.S.)
- Release dates: March 25, 1989 (Philippines); June 9, 1989 (U.S.)
- Country: United States
- Language: English
- Budget: $490,000–560,000

Action U.S.A. is a 1989 American action film directed by John Stewart and starring Barri Murphy, Gregory Scott Cummins, William Hubbard Knight, Hoke Howell, William Smith, Cameron Mitchell and Ross Hagen. The directorial debut of veteran stunt coordinator Stewart, it had a modest release in 1989, but was rediscovered by a broader audience during a 2020 theatrical revival.

== Plot ==
A woman is protected by two FBI agents after the murder of her boyfriend by gangsters wanting his stolen diamonds.

== Cast ==
- Barri Murphy as Carmen
- Gregory Scott Cummins as Clay Osborn
- William Hubbard Knight as Earl “Panama” McKinnon
- Hoke Howell as Hitch
- William Smith as Conover
- Cameron Mitchell as Frankie Navarro
- Ross Hagen as Drago
- Gary Beal as Gurrick
- Malcom King as Perez
- Rod Shaft as Billy Ray

== Production ==
=== Development ===
Stunt coordinator John Stewart had sizeable experience as a second unit director, but was struggling to raise money for his true directorial debut. When he mentioned the problem to his neighbor, Porsche dealer Wolfram Berger, the latter offered to finance it. Additional funds came from fellow members of the stunt community. Stewart wrote the synopsis, and David Reskin fleshed it out into a screenplay, based on a list of stunts that the former wanted to include in the film. Several rewrites took place on location, in function of the opportunities—and the occasional setback—that presented themselves.

Waco, Texas, was selected as the main location in December 1987 when it was recommended by cinematographer Thomas Callaway, a former city resident. He contacted Alan and Susan Stewart (no relation to John) of Stewart Production Services, for whom he had shot the horror western Ghost Riders. Although Waco did not have a dedicated commission, local authorities were interested in pushing the city as a filming site after seeing a rash of movies made in Waxahachie in the years prior. Among the location scouts was future producer Orian Williams, who made his industry debut on this film.

=== Casting ===
The three original leads were brought in from Los Angeles. However, on the first day of filming, the lead actress walked off to pursue a bigger TV role. Alan Stewart threatened to sue, but his tight budget forced him to move on quickly, and she was replaced by Texas-based Barri Murphy. Modeling agency Everett-Asbury, a fixture of local press and TV, placed seventeen of its clients in the film, most of them as Frankie Navarro's girls. A number of them were Baylor University students, which forced the director to stay just shy of nudity in this instance. To streamline the small production, as many heavies as possible were played by stuntmen so that they could be shown in all shots.

=== Filming ===
Principal photography spanned a twenty-two-day period between March 7 and March 28, 1988. According to Stewart, there were eighteen days of actual filming. It took place in Waco and nearby Robinson, as well as in the Lake Whitney area. The border was represented by a bridge on the Bosque River. The high fall was supposed to be filmed at the ALICO Building, Waco's tallest, but no airbag could be found to secure the 246-feet drop. It was eventually captured at the First National Bank Building at 801 Washington Ave. (today dubbed Baylor Tower). The mass brawl was filmed at the Melody Bar Ranch, and was coordinated by Bill Erickson, another veteran stuntman. The volunteer extras were invited to participate by John Stewart during an appearance on a local radio show.

While there were a few complaints about filming-related disruptions, the majority of the community was highly supportive, which helped beef up production values beyond the film's budget. The mayor personally helped the crew to clear downtown streets for the helicopter fly-by. Several cars and even a gas station were given by the locals to blow up for free. Billy Ray's car was a 1974 Corvette Stingray customized by a local enthusiast, and a frequent sight at regional conventions. The owner let John Stewart use it after he saw it parked in front of a store.

The crew was a mix of Hollywood transplants and locals, totaling 45 to 50 people. Among them were a dozen Baylor University students, who received three hours of course credit for their work. For insurance reasons, John Stewart himself did not perform any stunt, as he also directed. A local hotel, the Brazos Inn, was used as production headquarters, as well as to house the car derelicts left from the shoot. Much of the crew was retained for the filming of Waco's first music video, "So What" by local band Ador, during the first weekend of April. It was directed by Frank Patterson, a regular collaborator of Callaway and Allan Walsh.

=== Post-production ===
Post-production took place in Los Angeles, but fell behind schedule by two and half months and dragged on into November 1988, mostly due to difficulties relating to the soundtrack. The provisional budget presented by Alan Stewart to Waco officials was $560,000, about $100,000 of which would go to the local economy. John Stewart later said that the picture had come in at $490,000.

== Release ==
=== Pre-release ===
Right after the shoot, a sizzle reel was assembled and shipped to Cannes for the local Film Market, where the film sold in several major markets such as West Germany and Japan.

=== Theatrical ===
Action U.S.A. was first seen in some international territories, such as the Philippines where it opened as Above the Law on March 25, 1989. The film was originally scheduled for a January 1990 domestic premiere. It eventually received a series of three screening at the Hippodrome Theatre in Waco, where it was made, on June 9, 10 and 11, 1989. Those were not rated by the MPAA. The film was still billed as Handful of Trouble, although it was already known that it would be retitled to Action U.S.A. for general release.

On November 6, 2020, a restored version of the film was released at twelve Alamo Drafthouse cinemas, before touring further locations in the following weeks.

=== Home media ===
The film had its wide domestic release on VHS and Betamax through Imperial Entertainment on July 20, 1989. Due to COVID-19 restrictions, the restored Action U.S.A.'s debut, which was due to be the traditional "Secret Screening" of Austin's Fantastic Fest, instead took place during an online "Celebration of Fantastic Fest" event on September 27, 2020. The movie was brought to Blu-ray on November 27, 2020, by Vinegar Syndrome.

=== Critical response ===
Action U.S.A. has received mostly negative reviews. Carl Hoover of the Waco Tribune-Herald called the film "strictly grade C material". The acting ranges from passable to laughable, and there's not enough plot to disturb the brain. The operative word here is action, however, and director John Stewart provides plenty of it." The Toronto Star granted that "great stunts and good photography keep the movie [...] running along at a good clip. But excessive reliance on the ancient action movie formula is what ultimately shoots it down. Not a moment goes by that isn't totally predictable."VideoHound's Golden Movie Retriever was also unimpressed with the narrative, writing that "[t]hroughout Texas [the heroine] rambles with the mob sniffing at her heels, grateful for the opportunity to participate in numerous stunts and car crashes."

On the occasion of its re-issue on modern media, the film has enjoyed a modest reappraisal. Brian Ordorf of Blu-ray.com deemed that "Action U.S.A. is no thriller, despite a screenplay that clumsily attempts to create characters and situations of intimidation. It doesn't have the polish for that type of escapism. Instead, Stewart [packs] it with car chases, high falls, explosions, and fisticuffs, on a mission to create excitement with the limited resources he has. He succeeds for the most part, as long as dialogue and drama are ignored. Variety called the rediscovered film as "an excellent example of the type of escapist fun that packed drive-in theaters as recently as a decade ago but is now without a natural home."
