= Brian Hurwitz =

Professor Brian Hurwitz FRCP FRCGP

Professor of Medicine and the Arts, King's College London
- Incumbent
- Assumed office 2002

Personal details
- Born: 12 December 1951 (age 74)

Brian Hurwitz (born 12 December 1951) is a British clinician and academic and Professor of Medicine and the Arts at King's College London. Formerly, he was the director of the Centre for the Humanities and Health at King's College London and a medical General Practitioner. He is now Emeritus Professor of Medicine and the Arts at King's College London.

He was educated at Ackworth School near Pontefract and Cheadle Hulme School in Cheshire, before taking a BA in History and Philosophy of Science at the University of Cambridge in 1974. He then graduated with an MBBS from University College, London in 1977, becoming a House Officer first at University College Hospital and then Northwick Park Hospital.

He became a General Practitioner (GP) in 1981 and a Registrar at Bloomsbury District Health Authority in 1982. He completed his GP specialisation training in 1985.

In 1995 he joined Imperial College London as senior lecturer in the Department of Primary Health, becoming head of department in 1999. He moved to King's College London as Professor of Medicine and the Arts in 2002.

Hurwitz was awarded a Strategic Award by the Wellcome Trust in 2008 for a project, 'The Boundaries of Illness'. For the project, the Centre for the Humanities and Health was established at King's College London.
