= Inner Sanctum (1991 film) =

1991 film by Fred Olen Ray

- Film poster
- Directed by: Fred Olen Ray
- Written by: Mark Thomas McGee
- Produced by: Alan Amiel
- Starring: Tanya Roberts
- Cinematography: Michael Delahoussaye
- Edited by: Steven Nielson
- Music by: Chuck Cirino
- Release date: 1991
- Running time: 90 minutes
- Country: USA
- Language: English
- Budget: $650,000

Inner Sanctum is a 1991 American crime erotic thriller film which stars Tanya Roberts, Margaux Hemingway, Joseph Bottoms and Valerie Wildman, and was written by Mark Thomas McGee and directed by Fred Olen Ray.

The film was made for $650,000 and was very successful, leading to Ray making a series of erotic thrillers.

"I didn't really know what an erotic thriller was when I did Inner Sanctum", admitted Ray later. "I watched Wild Orchid—fast-forwarded through it, actually—to see what was expected of me."

== Plot ==
Jennifer Reed, heiress to a huge fortune, believes that her husband Baxter, an insurance agent in Los Angeles, is unfaithful to her. Unable to reconcile with it, she takes a full pack of sleeping pills and falls down the stairs.

A few weeks later, Jennifer, now in a wheelchair, becomes even more jealous of her husband because he does not spend time with her, giving more attention to nurse Lynn Foster. Foster had previously been responsible for home care of a patient. After the patient died mysteriously, Nurse Foster married the widower, who then also died under mysterious circumstances.

Baxter attempts romance with his colleague Anna Rawlins, who does not reciprocate his feelings. Moreover, Baxter suspects that she wants to get rid of his wife. Jennifer discovers that someone has started following her, and her neighbor suspects Lynn. Complicating things, Jennifer carries a million dollar life insurance policy, which policy will not be paid in case of suicide, only murder.

== Cast ==
- Tanya Roberts as Lynn Foster
- Margaux Hemingway as Anna Rawlins
- Joseph Bottoms as Baxter Reed
- Valerie Wildman as Jennifer Reed
- Brett Baxter Clark as Neil Semple
- Suzanne Ager as Maureen
- Jay Richardson as Lieutenant Wanamaker
- William Butler as Jeff Seigel
- Ted Newsom as Sergeant Levy

== Reception ==
TV Guide found that "Inner Sanctum sustains its perfervid mystery plot for a surprisingly long while before collapsing into an unsatisfying, if crypto-feminist, ending."

== Sequel ==
The film's success led to a sequel Inner Sanctum II in 1994, also directed by Fred Olen Ray, and starring Michael Nouri, Tracy Brooks Swope (as Jennifer Reed), Sandahl Bergman, David Warner, and Margaux Hemingway (reprising her role of Anna Rawlins).
