= Scalps (1983 film) =

1983 American horror film directed by Fred Olen Ray

- Theatrical poster
- Directed by: Fred Olen Ray
- Screenplay by: Fred Olen Ray
- Story by: T.L. Lankford; Fred Olen Ray; John Ray
- Produced by: T.L. Lankford (as The Eel)
- Starring: Jo-Ann Robinson; Richard Hench; Roger Maycock
- Cinematography: Larry Van Loon; Cynthia Webster
- Edited by: John Barr
- Music by: Drew Neumann; Eric Rasmussen
- Distributed by: 21st Century Film Corporation
- Release date: 1983
- Running time: 82 min
- Country: United States
- Language: English
- Budget: $15,000

Scalps is a 1983 American horror film directed by Fred Olen Ray that concerns a vengeful Native American spirit.

== Plot ==
Six college archeology students work on a dig in the California desert, despite the warnings of a professor and an elderly Native American. When the group digs around in an Indian burial ground for artifacts, they unleash the evil spirit of Black Claw. The entity possesses one of the group and begins slaughtering them one by one.

== Cast ==
- Jo-Ann Robinson as D.J.
- Richard Hench as Randy / Black Claw
- Roger Maycock as Kershaw Ellerbe
- Frank McDonald as Ben Murphy
- Carol Sue Flockhart as Louise Landon
- Barbara Magnusson as Ellen Corman
- Kirk Alyn as Professor Machen
- Carroll Borland as Dr. Sharon Reynolds
- Cynthia Hartline as Ann
- Forrest J Ackerman as Professor Trentwood

== Production ==
Ray says the idea for the film was suggested to him by a friend, Donald G. Jackson. "It was meant to be the cheapest film possible," said Ray. "I used to describe it as 6 Kids, a Station Wagon and a Tent and it pretty much was."

== Release ==
The film was re-edited by the distributor. Ray later recalled:

The cut we turned in was the one we wanted. Unfortunately being pretty green about that end of the business we also gave them, the distributor, the trims and outs and the result was their "improved" version. The Lion head was only meant to be seen for one or two seconds, but we shot a lot of it in order to have footage to choose from. It was a big mistake giving 21st Century the leftovers, but I don't think anyone would have guessed what was going to happen with it. They also cut in some shots of the killer Indian before he actually appeared in the story. It was maddening.

The film was given a limited release theatrically in the United States by 21st Century Film Corporation beginning in December 1983.

The film was released in the U.S. on a double feature video format by Continental Video alongside another feature - The Slayer. It was cut by five minutes or so, in order to make room for the second feature, but all the gruesome scenes and violence are intact.

The film was released on DVD by Olen Ray's Retromedia Entertainment in 2004. This release is currently out of print.

Ray says the film mentioned at the end, Scalps 2: The Return of D.J. was a joke, one he used on Phantom Empire and Hollywood Chainsaw Hookers. "I used to promise sequels where I never intended to do them." He says, though, that a fan once sent him a fan-made sequel.

The film was loosely remade in 2004 as Blood Desert by Stegath Dorr.

88 Films released the film on Blu-ray in 2016.
