= Regina Banali =

American filmmaker and actress

Regina Russell Banali
- Occupations: Film director, producer, actress
- Spouse: Frankie Banali (deceased)
- Website: pinkmermaid.productions

Regina Russell Banali is an American film producer, director, television presenter, and actress. She has appeared in over 50 films and television shows.

== Biography ==
One of her first roles as an actress was playing one of the three mermaids who save Robin Williams's character in Steven Spielberg's Hook (1991). She produced and directed a commissioned comedy short for Crackle and PSAs for the HSUS on animal welfare issues. She directed and produced a feature-length documentary called Quiet Riot – Well Now You're Here There's No Way Back about the hard rock band Quiet Riot. It premiered on the Showtime Network January 29, 2015.

Banali owned and operated Celebrity Closet Raiders, a designer resale store in West Hollywood which carried merchandise previously owned by celebrities.

Banali was married to Quiet Riot drummer and manager Frankie Banali until his death due to pancreatic cancer on August 20, 2020. Following his diagnosis, she became a vocal supporter of early detection and self-advocacy in healthcare.

== Filmography ==
- 2023 We Kill for Love as Herself
- 2019 In the Blood Writer/Producer/Director
- 2017 Quiet Riot: Can't Get Enough Producer/Director
- 2015 How Randy Rhoads Met Ozzy Writer/Producer/Director
- 2015 Kevin Memories Writer/Producer/Director
- 2015 A Conversation with Dee Snider Writer/Producer/Director
- 2015 A Conversation with Jodi Vigier Writer/Producer/Director
- 2015 A Conversation with John 5 Producer/Director
- 2015 A Conversation with Kelly Garni Writer/Producer/Director
- 2015 A Conversation with Lark Williams Writer/Producer/Director
- 2015 A Conversation with Steven Adler Writer/Producer/Director
- 2015 A Conversation with the Rhoads Family Writer/Producer/Director
- 2015 Back to the Coast Producer/Director
- 2015 Casino Wedding Writer/Producer/Director
- 2015 Frankie's Office Writer/Producer/Director
- 2015 Sally Steele Writer/Producer/Director
- 2015 Thunderbird Montage Writer/Producer/Director
- 2015 Tour of Musonia Writer/Producer/Director
- 2018 Vice Girls 2: Undercover Escorts
- 2014 QUIET RIOT: Well Now You're Here, There's No Way Back Writer/Producer/Director
- 2009 The Millionaire Matchmaker as Herself (TV Series)
- 2009 E! News Weekend as Herself (TV Series)
- 2008 Matt Grant PSA for Spaying and Neutering Pets Writer/Producer/Director
- 2008 Brad Garrett Pans Puppy Mills Writer/Producer/Director
- 2008 Dating Brad Garrett as Herself (TV Series)
- 2008 I Should Be F***ing Brad Garrett as Herself/Writer/Producer/Director
- 2007 The Fashion Team as Herself
- 2007 Fall Guy: The John Stewart Story as Cazz
- 2007 The Fashion Team as Herself (TV Series)
- 2006 Cannibal Tattoo as Annie Tramblyn
- 2006 Access Hollywood as Herself (TV Series)
- 1993-2006 Good Day L.A. as Herself (TV Series)
- 2005 The Today Show as Herself
- 2005 One More Round as Sonya
- 2005 Hotel Erotica as Lena (TV Series)
- 2005 Today as Herself (TV Series)
- 2003 Bad Bizness as Angela Summers
- 2003 Bikini Airways as Terri
- 2003 Visions of Passion as Alice
- 2003 The Mummy's Kiss as Helena
- 2003 Hollywood Homicide as Sartain Receptionist
- 2003 Cheerleader Massacre as Buzzy's Flashback Girl
- 2003 Baberellas as Renna
- 2002 America's Most Wanted: America Fights Back as Francesca (TV Series)
- 2002 Wolfhound as Fantasy Girl
- 2002 Wheatfield with Crows as Karen
- 2002 The Model Solution as Caroline
- 2002 Zig Zag as Dancer #2
- 2001 Savage Season as Tricia
- 2001 Sex Court: The Movie as Kayla
- 2001 Passion Cove as Mary Ann (TV Series)
- 2001 Lady Chatterley's Stories as Beth (TV Series)
- 2001 Scandal: Sex@students.edu as Christina
- 2001 Scandal: 15 Minutes of Fame as Amanda
- 2001 Playboy Exposed: Playboy Mansion Parties Uncensored as Herself
- 2000 Sex Files: Sexual Matrix as Tracie
- 2000 The Sex Files: Pleasureville as Patty Watts
- 2000 House of Love as Mojave
- 2000 Bedtime Stories as Carolyn (TV Series)
- 2000 Scandal: Lawful Entry as Brigitte
- 2000 Sex Files: Ancient Desires as Anne Reno
- 2000 Sex Files: Alien Erotica II as Dr. Betty Brooks
- 2000 Kama Sutra as Elise (TV Series)
- 2000 Bare Deception as Debbie
- 2000 Passion's Obsession as Trixie
- 2000 Luck of the Draw as Zippo's Boudoir Girl
- 1999 Erotic Confessions: Volume 11 as Julia (Episode: The Wedding Parties)
- 1999 Nightcap as Suzanne (TV Series)
- 1999 The Big Hitter as Ginger
- 1999 The Pleasure Zone as Debbie (TV Series)
- 1998 Erotic Confessions as Julia (TV Series)
- 1992 Dire Straits: The Bug as Girl (Grown Up) (Music Video)
- 1991 Hook as Red-Headed Pink Tailed Mermaid
- 1991 Saved by the Bell as Rachel (uncredited)
