= Chopping Mall =

1986 film by Jim Wynorski

- Theatrical release poster
- Directed by: Jim Wynorski
- Written by: Jim Wynorski; Steve Mitchell
- Produced by: Julie Corman
- Starring: Kelli Maroney; Tony O'Dell; John Terlesky; Russell Todd; Paul Bartel; Mary Woronov; Barbara Crampton
- Cinematography: Tom Richmond
- Edited by: Leslie Rosenthal
- Music by: Chuck Cirino
- Production companies: Concorde Pictures; Trinity Pictures
- Distributed by: Concorde Pictures
- Release dates: March 14, 1986 (limited); November 14, 1986 (New York City)
- Running time: 76 minutes (Note: The original cut of the film, titled Killbots, ran 95 minutes, but it was shortened significantly after test screenings of the film were poorly-received.)
- Country: United States
- Language: English
- Budget: $800,000 (estimated)

Chopping Mall is a 1986 American independent techno-horror film co-written and directed by Jim Wynorski, produced by Julie Corman, and starring Kelli Maroney, Tony O'Dell, John Terlesky, Russell Todd, Paul Bartel, Mary Woronov, and Barbara Crampton. It focuses on three high-tech security robots turning maniacal and killing teenage employees inside a shopping mall after dark.

The film was test-screened under the title Killbots by its distributor, Concorde Pictures. After it performed poorly with test audiences, the film was re-titled Chopping Mall, and approximately 19 minutes were excised.

In the years since its release, Chopping Mall has gone on to develop a cult following, and its perceived themes of human consumption and excess during the Reagan Era in the United States have been the topic of film criticism.

== Plot ==
Park Plaza Mall has just installed a state-of-the-art security system, including shutters across all exits and three high-tech robots programmed to disable and apprehend thieves using tasers and tranquilizer guns. Allison Parks and Suzie Lynn, co-workers at a pizzeria in the mall, join up with Ferdy Meisel and Greg Wiliams (Suzie's boyfriend) along with their other friends, couples Rick and Linda Stanton, and Mike Brennan and Leslie Todd—for an after-hours party in a furniture store where Mike, Greg, and Ferdy work. Once the mall closes for the night, the two couples begin to have sex, drink, and party inside the furniture store while Allison is set up to watch movies with Ferdy.

Outside, a lightning storm strikes the mall several times and damages the computer controlling Protectors 1, 2 and 3, which malfunction and kill the technicians and a janitor before starting their routine patrol. When Mike goes to purchase cigarettes for Leslie at a vending machine, Protector 1 attacks him and slashes his throat. When Leslie goes to find him, she is chased by Protector 1, which kills her with a laser. The others witness Leslie's death, and barricade themselves in a stock room.

The women attempt to escape through an air vent, but Suzie panics and they exit the vent system into an automotive shop, arming themselves with gasoline and flares. Meanwhile, the men break into a sporting-goods store to arm themselves with firearms. Reunited, the group use a propane tank to seemingly destroy Protector 1. While the men set up the elevator as a booby trap, the killbots ambush the women and ignite Suzie by shooting her gasoline can, burning her alive. Greg unsuccessfully shoots them before Rick drags him away.

The teenagers regroup and rig the elevator trap on Protector 2, destroying it. They then hide in the restaurant where Allison works. Inside, Greg confronts Allison and Linda about leaving the air ducts and exhibits rage due to Suzie's death, pulling his gun on Ferdy when he intercedes on Allison and Linda's behalf. Rick tries to calm him down, and Ferdy suggests destroying the killbots' main control center in hopes of shutting them all down. The group agrees and heads to the control center on the third floor. The robot throws Greg over the railing and he falls to his death.

On the run, the four remaining survivors, Allison, Ferdy, Rick, and Linda also find the first Protector robot recovered after its earlier defeat. They take refuge inside a department store and set up mannequins to confuse Protector 1 and Protector 3. Their plan works, as the robots fire at the dummies and one of them blinds itself with its own reflected laser. However, the blind Protector 3 kills Linda, and an enraged Rick rams a golf cart into it. A bolt of electricity kills him, but his attack succeeds in destroying the third Protector robot.

Protector 1 corners Allison, but Ferdy rescues her and shoots it point-blank, damaging its laser just before he falls unconscious. Despite an injured leg, Allison escapes into Ellis Paint Company and sets up a trap by mixing paint and chemicals. Allison then lures Protector 1 inside, where it gets stuck, unable to get traction on the spilled paint and thinners. Allison then tosses a flare into the store, igniting the chemicals and finally destroying Protector 1. As daylight appears, Allison leaves the store and Ferdy awakens. The two remain the only survivors.

In a post-credits scene, a fourth, unknown Protector says its catchphrase "Have a nice day" one last time.

== Cast ==
- Kelli Maroney as Allison Parks
- Tony O'Dell as Ferdy Meisel
- Russell Todd as Rick Stanton
- Karrie Emerson as Linda Stanton
- Barbara Crampton as Suzie Lynn
- Nick Segal as Greg Williams
- Suzee Slater as Leslie Todd
- John Terlesky as Mike Brennan
- Paul Bartel as Paul Bland
- Mary Woronov as Mary Bland
- Angela Aames as Miss Vanders
- Dick Miller as Walter Paisley
- Paul Coufos as Dr. Stan Simon
- Arthur Roberts as Mr. Todd
- Gerrit Graham as Nessler, The Technician
- Lawrence Guy as Dr. Carrington
- Toni Naples as Lead Bathing Beauty
- Mel Welles as Cook
- Jim Wynorski as Killbots (voice)
- Rodney Eastman as Shoplifter (uncredited)
- Lenny Juliano as Burglar In Training Film
- Robert Greenberg as "More Butter!" Customer

== Analysis ==
Film scholar Craig Ian Mann compares the film favorably to George A. Romero's Dawn of the Dead (1978)—also set in a shopping mall—which he classifies as an "anti-capitalist parable for the Jimmy Carter years," suggesting that Chopping Mall functions in a similar way as a comment on consumption during the Reagan Era. Mann suggests that the robots in the film, even when malfunctioning, serve as mechanical enforcers of workplace discipline and capitalist interests.

== Production ==
=== Writing ===
Julie Corman had a deal with Vestron to make a horror film that took place in a mall. Jim Wynorski agreed to write one cheaply if he could direct.

Wynorski wrote the script with Steve Mitchell, whom he had known since the 1970s, when they met at conventions for EC Comics, and became friends. They decided to do a "phantom of the mall"-type movie and Mitchell says it was Wynorski's idea to feature robots. Wynorski said he was inspired by the 1954 film Gog; he claims he never saw the 1973 TV film Trapped, which some believe inspired Chopping Mall.

Mitchell says they wrote up the story in 24 hours and sent it to Julie Corman. Vestron gave their approval within a week despite lack of a script. The script took around four or five weeks to write.

Wynorski says Roger Corman "was nothing but supportive from the get-go. He loved the idea."

=== Casting ===
Wynorski says Kelli Maroney was cast because "I had seen Kelli in a couple of things and I wanted to date her. So, I figured the one way to make that happen was to put her in a movie." She replaced Dana Kimmell, who had been cast on the strength of her performance in Lone Wolf McQuade but "Dana did not want to do anything that was sexual," according to Mitchell. "So Jim was very quick to say, "Well, she’s out, let’s get Kelli," who was pretty much game for anything." Karrie Emerson also replaced someone else.

The script was full of in-jokes, writing in characters from A Bucket of Blood and Eating Raoul. The writers got the actors from the respective films: Dick Miller, Mary Woronov, and Paul Bartel.

Mitchell wanted John Terlesky to play the hero Rick Stanton, but Wynorski wanted Russell Todd. Terlesky played the part of Mike Brennan. Chopping Mall also acts as a debut film for Rodney Eastman, who later went on to star in A Nightmare on Elm Street 3: Dream Warriors and A Nightmare on Elm Street 4: The Dream Master. According to Mitchell, Wynorski provided the voices of the Killbots.

=== Filming ===
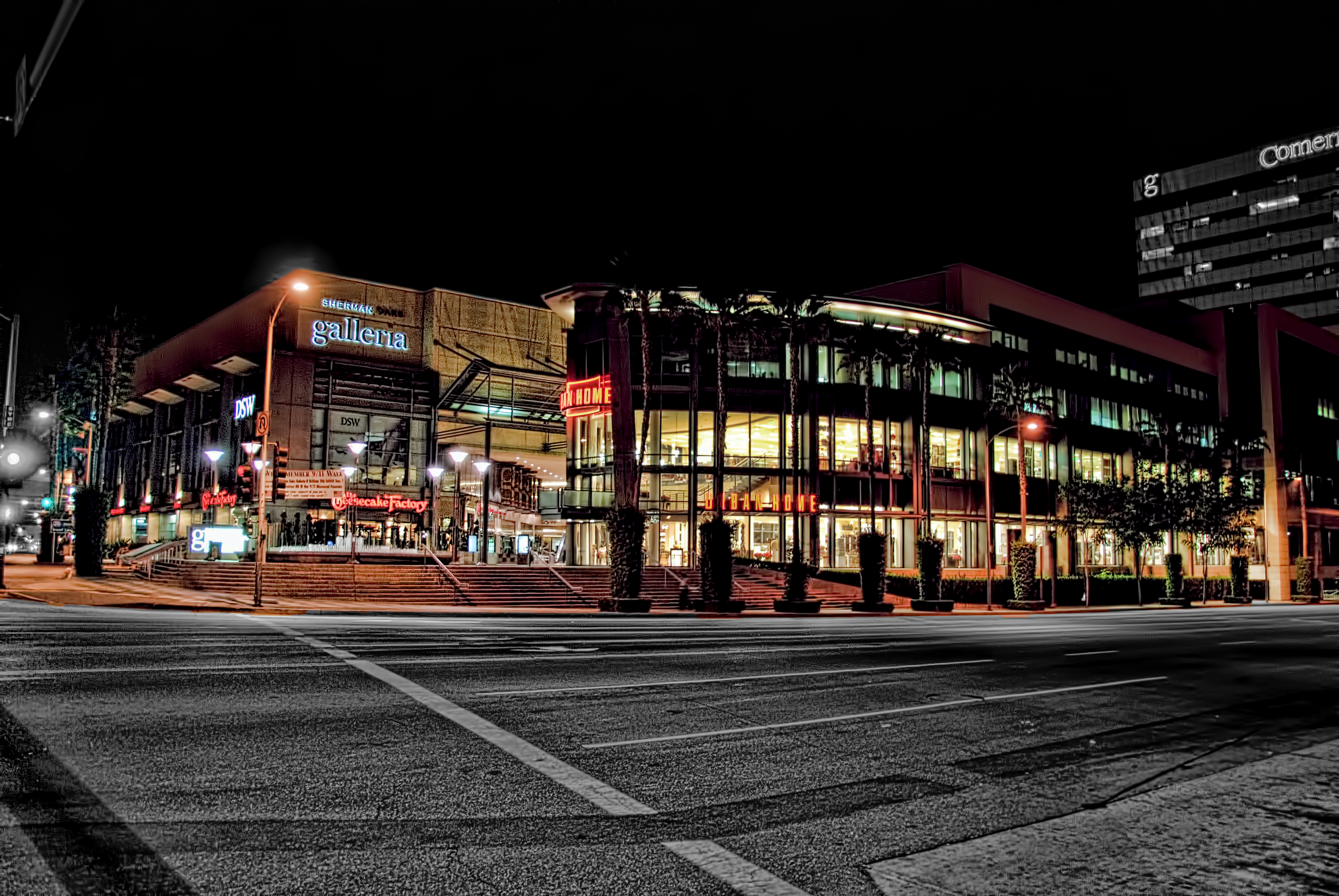
Portions of the film were shot on location at the Sherman Oaks Galleria

Wynorski says Roger Corman took him out to lunch before making the film. He bought a yellow pad, and after lunch he said "this here is what you gotta do", and he gave me film school in an hour. "Everything I learned in film school didn't count, but what he said made a lot of sense and I still have that yellow pad and I live by it. I now have it memorized, many dos and don'ts."

The film was intended to be shot on location at the Beverly Center, but the production was unable to afford their fee; instead, the majority of filming took place in the Sherman Oaks Galleria, where Fast Times at Ridgemont High (1982) and Commando (1985) had also been shot. The Beverly Center was used for exterior shots instead.

Mitchell later recalls, "I think we both felt a pretty fair amount of pressure when we started shooting. It was Julie’s picture, but it was still Roger’s company, and he was the bottom line. We both very much wanted to make him happy." He says, "the specter of Roger loomed large for the first couple of days", but after the second or third night, Corman said they were doing a "very fine job". "So there was a collective sigh of relief on our part that we were making Roger happy, and that’s what really mattered," says Mitchell.

Wynorski says that Bartel and Woronov ad-libbed the bulk of their parts.

Mitchell estimates filming took 20 days at the Galleria and two days at Corman's studios.

== Release and legacy ==
Concorde Pictures gave the film a regional test market release under the title Killbots on March 21, 1986. After it fared poorly with audiences, the film was truncated and re-titled Chopping Mall, under which it was theatrically released in Pittsburgh on September 5, 1986, and in New York City on November 14, 1986.

=== Critical response ===
On the review aggregator website Rotten Tomatoes, 58% of 12 critics' reviews are positive. Metacritic, which uses a weighted average, assigned the film a score of 22 out of 100, based on four critics, indicating "generally unfavorable" reviews.

=== Alternative versions ===
At least two different versions of the film exist. The TV cut has some extra footage, such as a small homage to Attack of the Crab Monsters, extended scenes of Ferdy Meisel (Tony O'Dell) and Allison Parks (Maroney) watching TV, some aerial shots, and an extension of one of the Ferdy/Allison scenes. No official source offers this version.

=== Home media ===
The film was released on VHS in the United States by the Vestron sublabel Lightning Video on April 7, 1987. Lionsgate released the film twice on DVD, once in 2004 (with special features including a featurette, commentary, still gallery, and trailer) and in 2012 as part of an 8-horror film DVD set. It was released for the first time on Blu-ray on September 27, 2016 as part of Lionsgate's new Vestron Video Collector's Series line.

Wynorski later said, the film "did okay when it was released in theaters. It got some okay reviews and did decent business, but it really found a life on VHS and cable. That’s when it really was embraced."

=== Novelization ===
In 2024, Encyclopocalypse Publications, along with Shout! Factory, published a tie-in novel as part of their Encyclopocalypse Movie Tie-in Series.

== Proposed remake ==
In November 2011, Dry County Entertainment acquired the film rights and intended to remake the film with a supernatural twist. The film was set to be produced and written by Kevin Bocarde and directed by Robert Hall. Hall died in May 2021. As of October 2025, nothing has materialized.

== Sources ==
- Mann, Craig Ian (2018). "Robot Rot: Mechanical Monsters in the Reagan Era". In Bro, Lisa Wenger; Gareis, Mary Ann; O'Leary-Davidson, Crystal (eds.). Monsters of Film, Fiction, and Fable: The Cultural Links Between the Human and Inhuman. Newcastle upon Tyne, England: Cambridge Scholars Publishing. pp. 90–113. ISBN 978-1-527-51483-6.
- Nashawaty, Chris (2013). Crab Monsters, Teenage Cavemen and Candy Stripe Nurses - Roger Corman: King of the B Movie. New York City, New York: Stewart, Tabori & Chang. ISBN 978-1-613-12981-4.
