= Super Shark =

- DVD cover
- Directed by: Fred Olen Ray
- Written by: Clyde McCoy; Antonio Olivas; Fred Olen Ray
- Produced by: Fred Olen Ray; Kimberly A. Ray
- Starring: John Schneider; Sarah Lieving; Tim Abell
- Cinematography: Ben Demaree
- Edited by: Randy Carter
- Music by: Jeffrey Walton
- Production companies: Boomgates; Retromedia Entertainment; Synthetic Filmwerx
- Distributed by: CineTel Films
- Release date: December 8, 2011
- Running time: 87 minutes
- Country: United States
- Language: English

Super Shark is a 2011 science fiction comedy horror film directed by Fred Olen Ray and starring John Schneider, Sarah Lieving, and Tim Abell. The film follows a marine biologist named Kat Carmichael, played by Sarah Lieving, who has to investigate and survive the rampage of a mutated primordial shark.

== Plot ==
Persistent exposure of ocean wildlife to a toxic goo used in oil drilling leads to a shark growing in size and becoming bulletproof, and even attaining the ability to move around on land. It destroys the oil rig that caused it, and then moves to Los Angeles where it eats several divers and threatens to disrupt a bikini contest.

Marine biologist Dr. Catherine Carmichael hires captain Chuck, a local drunk, to drive her out to the oil rig, owned by Traymore Industries, to investigate. Meanwhile, two female lifeguards plan to drink and have casual sex, and a kite surfer is eaten by the "super shark". Carmichael takes a water sample, then confronts the CEO of Traymore who invites her for drinks and dinner. When Carmichael interviews the sole survivor from the oil rig accident, it is disclosed that highly harmful chemicals were used to bore through the rock and that a shark pulled down the rig.

Meanwhile, Carmichael tells the CEO what she thinks happened: a "hydrolizing agent" caused the oil rig to crumble. Soon, a US Navy submarine disappears, and a search plane spots the super shark. At the bar, the two female lifeguards are joined by the male lifeguard, awaiting the bikini contest and one of the female lifeguards decides to enter the contest to impress the male lifeguard and win the prize and she gets up on stage and shows off her body but then leaves in disgust when she sees the other female lifeguard kissing the male lifeguard and then the two girls argue on the beach as the shark appears and eats them. Back out on the ocean, Carmichael and skipper Chuck are circled by the super shark until Carmichael, acting on a hunch, tells Chuck to turn off the radio, after which the super shark leaves. She speculates that the fish was attracted to radio waves and sent out signals which disturbed radio reception.

The bikini contest winner and the runner-up are eaten at the beach, together with the photographer, who had had the radio playing. The CEO reveals that he knows that Carmichael has been fired from her job for harassing oil company executives. He offers her a briefcase full of money if she'll go away; she accepts. Skipper Chuck finds her drunk in a bar; she tells him that she was fired, and that her brother died when the Exxon Valdez went down. She passes out and wakes up in Chuck's boat.

Carmichael and skipper Chuck get emotionally close, and seek contact with the military, which has invented a remote-controlled tank that can walk and jump. With the help of a boombox and external speaker, the super shark is lured to a beach, where the tank is unsuccessful in shooting it. Carmichael manages to drop a bomb made of C-4 explosives into the beast's mouth, and it is blown to pieces.

== Cast ==
- Sarah Lieving as Kat Carmichael
- John Schneider as Roger Wade
- Tim Abell as Skipper Chuck
- Rick Cramer as Colonel Caldwell
- Trish Cook as Captain Marshall
- John L. Curtis as Brody
- Jimmie Walker as "Dynamite" Stevens
- Kylee Nash as Bikini Contestant

== Release ==
The film was released on DVD on February 7, 2012.

== Reception ==
The Lexikon des internationalen Films - Filmjahr 2012 found that the special effects in the film were too poor for it to compete with Godzilla productions. The Geman book Die 100 schlechtesten Filme aller Zeiten-Das große SchleFaZ-Buch included it in its list of the 100 worst films of all time.

However, various reviews found that precisely because of its extremely unconvincing production, the film remains entertaining.

== See also ==
- List of killer shark films
