= Amy Lindsay =

American actress

- Born: 1966 (age 59–60); United States
- Occupations: Former actress; softcore pornography performer
- Notable work: Star Trek: Voyager
- Website: amylindsay.com (Archived)

Amy Lindsay (born 1966) is an American actress and former softcore pornography film performer.

Lindsay has had guest television appearances as Lana in the Star Trek: Voyager episode "Endgame", in Silk Stalkings, and as Sherry Drake on Pacific Blue.

== Filmography ==
- 1995 The House on Todville Road as Isadora
- 1995 The Dark Dancer as Teen-Age Margaret
- 1995 Exploding Angel as Angel
- 1996 The Portrait of a Lady as Miss Molyneaux #1 (credited as Katie Campbell)
- 1996 White Cargo as Cherry
- 1997 Silk Stalkings as White (TV Series)
- 1997 Confessions of a Lap Dancer as Jo (credited as Lynsey Ames)
- 1998 Femalien 2 as Terry (credited as Summer Leeds)
- 1998 Sex Files: Portrait of the Soul as Rebecca (credited as Candi)
- 1998 Intimate Sessions as Karen (credited as Lindsay Blair) (TV Series)
- 1998 Erotic Confessions as Amy (TV Series)
- 1998 Confessions of a Call Girl as Chloe (credited as Lexie Tyler
- 1998 Beverly Hills Bordello as Annie (credited as Alexis Blair) (TV Series)
- 1999 Women: Stories of Passion as Jenny Clemens (TV Series)
- 1999 Pacific Blue as Sherry Drake (TV Series)
- 1999 Timegate: Tales of the Saddle Tramps as Grace
- 1999 The Pleasure Zone as Trisha (TV Series)
- 1999 Forbidden Sins as Molly Malone
- 1999 Pleasure Zone: Volume 2 as Trisha
- 2000 Secrets of a Chambermaid as J.J.
- 2000 Casting Couch (credited as Summer Leeds)
- 2000 Perfumed Gardens: Tales of the Kama Sutra as Lisa
- 2000 Stepsister from Planet Weird as Becca (credited as Katie Campbell)
- 2000 Passion's Desire as Jill
- 2000 Warpath as Cindy Lake
- 2000 The Voyeur as Paula (credited as Leah Riley) (TV Series)
- 2000 Indecent Disclosure as Sandra (credited as Amy Lindsey)
- 2001 Intimacy (credited as Katie Campbell)
- 2001 Star Trek: Voyager as Lana (TV Series) (Episode End Game Part 1)
- 2001 Passion Lane as Olivia (credited as Leah Riley)
- 2002 Guinevere Jones as Wind / Winifred Winters (credited as Katie Campbell) (TV Series)
- 2002 Exposed as Angelle Taylor (credited as Leah Riley)
- 2002 Radio Erotica as Dr. Whitney
- 2002 Diary of Seduction as Malena Powers (credited as Leah Riley)
- 2002 Behind Closed Doors as Woman
- 2003 Final Examination as Kristen Neal
- 2003 The Best Sex Ever as Julie (TV Series)
- 2003 Descendant as Dee
- 2003 Bikini Airways as Pam (credited as Julie Snow)
- 2003 Private Sex Club as Alex (credited as Leah Riley)
- 2003 Bad Bizness as Brittany Johnson
- 2003 Insatiable Desires as Dr. Karin Clemens (credited as Leah Riley)
- 2004 Black Tie Nights as Olivia Hartley (TV Series)
- 2004 Kinky Sex Club as Faye (credited as Leah Riley)
- 2004 The Sex Spa II: Body Work as Diane (credited as Leah Riley)
- 2005 Reality Sex as Maria (credited as Leah Riley)
- 2005 Sex Games Vegas as Justine (credited as Leah Riley) (TV Series)
- 2006 Insatiable Desires as Winn Blake (credited as Leah Riley)
- 2007 The Erotic Traveler as Talia LaPeci (credited as Leah Riley) (TV Series)
- 2007 Hers as Prostitute
- 2007 Sin City Diaries as Margot (TV Series)
- 2007 Co-Ed Confidential as Sister Sara (credited as Leah Riley) (TV Series)
- 2008 Dog Tags as Trish Huddle
- 2008 Deviant Whores as Karin
- 2008 Lust Sessions as Kate (credited as Leah Riley)
- 2008 Cowboy Funeral as Waitress
- 2010 MILF as Holly Reese
- 2010 Animal Lust as Lisa (credited as Leah Riley)
- 2012 Celebrity Sex Tape as Shelby Jones
- 2012 Layover as Stewardess
- 2012 Paradox Alice as Kat Spencer
- 2012 Showstopper as Katherine Mitso
- 2013 Movie Star Idol as Ava Woodley (TV Series)
- 2013 Gone Dark as Bunny Wunny
- 2014 Camp Takota as Kathy Fefferman
- 2014 Surrendered as Mom With Crying Baby
- 2014 Sex Sent Me to the ER as Angel (uncredited) (TV Series)
- 2014 Bachelor Night as Mary
- 2014 Untitled Forever Young as Natalie
- 2014 The Big Bad City as Llorna Negri
- 2014 Holt Kills Randy
- 2015 KodeOrange: Los Angeles as Dr. Brandt (TV Series)
- 2015 Carnal Wishes as Agent
- 2016 Betrothed as Joan West
- 2016 Break-Up Nightmare as Daneen
- 2017 Deadly Sins as Laura (TV Series)
- 2018 MILF as Holly
- 2024 Scrambled as Mary-Anne

== Personal life ==
In 2016, Lindsay told BuzzFeed that she is a Christian conservative and a Republican, deciding between supporting Ted Cruz or Donald Trump.
