= Fred Olen Ray =

American filmmaker

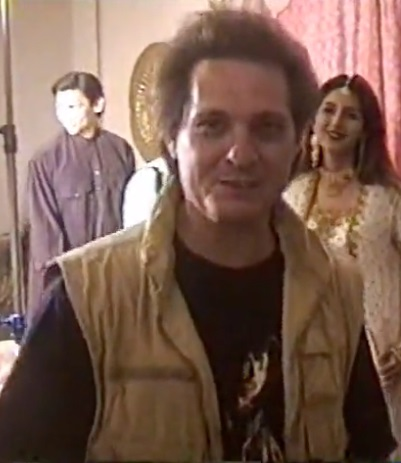
- Ray during the filming of Operation Cobra in 1996
- Born: September 10, 1954 (age 72); Wellston, Ohio, U.S.
- Occupations: Film producer; director; screenwriter; actor
- Years active: 1971–present
- Spouses: Dawn Wildsmith; Kimberly A. Ray (m. 1997)

Fred Olen Ray (born September 10, 1954) is an American film producer, director and screenwriter of more than 200 low quality feature films in many genres, including horror, science fiction, action/adventure, erotic thrillers, crime dramas, and holiday films.

Ray is the head of Retromedia, which releases DVDs of both his own productions and archival films. He has also worked for other well-known independent studios and on a few occasions for major Hollywood studios. He has been cited as an inspiration for many independent filmmakers. He loaned a 16mm camera to Quentin Tarantino so he could make My Best Friend's Birthday.

Aside from his work in the film industry, Ray was also a professional wrestler. His wrestling name was Fabulous Freddie Valentine.

== Early life ==
Ray was born September 10, 1954, in Wellston, Ohio, to a family originally from West Virginia. As a teenager, he regularly read Famous Monsters of Filmland magazine. Being a fan of horror and science fiction films such as Abbott and Costello Meet Frankenstein and the AIP movies of the 1950s and 1960s, Ray started making his own movies at the age of fourteen. At age seventeen, he self-published three issues of the amateur fantasy-film fanzine Dagon in 1972.

== Career ==
=== Early work and The Brain Leeches (1970s) ===
After serving in the United States Navy, Ray began working at a local television station in Orlando, Florida. He first appeared in a small role in the 1975 film Shock Waves, which starred Peter Cushing and John Carradine. Ray then began directing independent films during his free time using station equipment, starting with The Brain Leeches (1978), produced on a budget of $298. Ray also co-wrote the screenplay with political essayist Brad Linaweaver, and the two later collaborated on additional films.

=== 1980s ===
Ray's next film was shot on a budget of $15,000. Lessons learned from The Brain Leeches allowed Ray to keep production cost to a minimum, while using the bulk of the budget to attract a recognized Hollywood name to the project. Alien Dead was shot featuring an elderly Buster Crabbe, cinema action hero of the 1930s and 1940s, and star of three Flash Gordon serials from 1936 to 1940. With the success of that film, Ray decided to move to Hollywood to be close to the film industry. He was interested in working in make-up and special effects, "probably from all of those years of reading Famous Monsters magazine", he later said. He found out "it soon became apparent that you would always be between jobs and I was looking for something that would actually earn me a living. I think I became a director because that was the fastest way to get a film made on the independent side of things."

Ray succeeded in raising money for a low-budget horror film, Scalps (1983), which featured cameos from Carroll Borland and Forrest J. Ackerman. The Tomb (1986) stars Cameron Mitchell and John Carradine. Ray switched to action films with Armed Response (1986), which stars David Carradine and Lee Van Cleef. Ray had affection for this movie because "it had a great cast and was one of the first times I had more than two nickels to rub together." He then turned to science fiction: Deep Space (1987) and Cyclone (1987). Beverly Hills Vamp (1988) was a horror comedy with Eddie Deezen.

=== 1990s ===
After Alienator (1989) he was reunited with Deezen for Mob Boss (1990), another comedy. He entered sword and sorcery movies with Wizards of the Demon Sword (1991) and made the more popular Bad Girls from Mars (1991). During this time he published his book, The New Poverty Row: Independent Filmmakers as Distributors (1991).

Ray co-directed Scream Queen Hot Tub Party (1991) with Jim Wynorski, starring Kelli Maroney, shot in one day. Ray moved into erotic thrillers with Inner Sanctum (1991) starring Tanya Roberts. It was a hit and Ray would make others in that genre, including Inner Sanctum 2, Mind Twister (1994) and Possessed by the Night (1994).

Evil Toons (1992) is a comedy-horror, which was followed by another effort co-directed with Wynorski, Dinosaur Island (1994). Witch Academy (1994) was the last of his "scream queen" movies. After Attack of the 60 Foot Centerfold (1995), he made Fugitive Rage (1996), Friend of the Family II (1996), Inferno (1997), Hybrid (1997), and The Shooter, which has been referred to as Ray's best film. Dear Santa (1998) is a family film and Billy Frankenstein (1998) is a comedy.

=== 2000s to present ===
In 2001, he made the film Critical Mass. He later said he was a "Critical Mass kind of guy. I like to shoot things and blow stuff up. I also like comedies. Don't like erotic thrillers."

He established a DVD company called Retromedia. Ray made a film called Bikini Airways "on a lark and it did really well", said Ray. This led to a series of Bikini films.

In 2007, he reflected on his career:

Money is always a barrier. The more they give you, the more they expect, so you're always caught short, regardless. I don't think anything I've done was ever budgeted properly for what was expected of me, but that's just the nature of the business, I guess. There certainly are films I did because there was a paycheck attached. It's a working man's world and it doesn't pay to get too idealistic about things like directing low-budget movies if you have a family to think about. I usually try to find something that interests me in each and every project. It's not really possible to phone it in. Making a film with no money or schedule is ten times harder than it is to make a big-budget show where you're surrounded by a gang of super-talented people.

Budgetary constraints notwithstanding, Ray has, on occasion, been able to attract A-list actors to appear in his films. Two-time Academy Award nominee Peter Fonda played Marshal Kane in the 2010 Ray film American Bandits: Frank and Jesse James, while Golden Globe Award winner Christian Slater appeared in Ray's 2012 film Hatfields and McCoys: Bad Blood. One reviewer described American Bandits as perhaps "the most boring Jesse James film ever made".

In 2017, he received a "Living Legend Award" at the Buffalo Dreams Fantastic Film Festival.

In 2019, he produced and released Boggy Creek: The Series, with director Henrique Couto at the helm.

== Books ==
- Grind Show - Weirdness as Entertainment (1993)
- The New Poverty Row: Independent Filmmakers as Distributors (2011), ISBN 978-0786467556
- Hell-Bent for Hollywood: A Director's Journey (2024), ISBN 979-8986521589

== Filmography ==
=== Film ===
Year	Title	Director	Writer	Producer	Notes
1978	The Brain Leeches	Yes	Yes	Yes	as Fred Ray; Brian Wolfe
1980	Alien Dead	Yes	Yes	Yes	as Fred Ray
1983	Scalps	Yes	Yes	No	
1985	Biohazard	Yes	Yes	Yes	
1986	Demented Death Farm Massacre	Yes	No	Yes	Reshoots
1986	Armed Response	Yes	Yes	Co-producer	
1986	The Tomb	Yes	No	Yes	
1986	Prison Ship (a.k.a. Star Slammer)	Yes	Co-writer	Co-producer	
1987	Commando Squad	Yes	No	Co-producer	
1987	Cyclone	Yes	Uncredited	No	
1987	Evil Spawn	Uncredited	No	Yes	
1988	The Phantom Empire	Yes	Yes	Yes	
1988	Hollywood Chainsaw Hookers	Yes	Yes	Yes	as Dr. S. Carver
1988	Deep Space	Yes	Yes	Yes	
1988	Warlords	Yes	No	Yes	
1989	Terminal Force	Yes	No	Yes	
1989	Beverly Hills Vamp	Yes	No	Yes	
1990	Alienator	Yes	No	No	
1990	Haunting Fear	Yes	Yes	Yes	
1990	Mob Boss	Yes	No	Yes	
1990	Spirits	Yes	No	No	
1990	Bad Girls from Mars	Yes	Yes	Yes	as Sherman Scott
1991	Scream Queen Hot Tub Party	Yes	Yes	Yes	as Bill Carson
1991	Wizards of the Demon Sword	Yes	No	Yes	
1991	Inner Sanctum	Yes	No	Co-producer	
1992	Evil Toons	Yes	Yes	Yes	
1994	Mind Twister	Yes	No	No	
1994	Dinosaur Island	Yes	No	Yes	
1994	Possessed by the Night	Yes	Yes	No	
1994	Inner Sanctum 2	Yes	No	Yes	
1995	Sorceress	No	No	Yes	
1995	Bikini Drive-In	Yes	No	Yes	as Randy Rocket
1995	Attack of the 60 Foot Centerfold	Yes	No	Yes	
1995	Witch Academy	Yes	No	Yes	
1995	Droid Gunner (a.k.a. Cyberzone)	Yes	No	Yes	
1996	Star Hunter	Yes	No	Yes	as Sam Newfield
1996	Invisible Mom	Yes	No	Yes	
1996	Masseuse	Yes	No	No	as Peter Daniels
1996	Over the Wire	Yes	No	No	as Nicholas Medina
1996	Night Shade	Yes	No	Yes	as Nicholas Medina
1996	Friend of the Family II	Yes	No	No	as Nicholas Medina
1996	Fugitive Rage	Yes	No	Yes	
1997	Illicit Dreams 2	Yes	No	Yes	as Roger Collins
1997	Inferno (a.k.a. Operation Cobra)	Yes	No	No	
1997	Maximum Security	Yes	No	No	as Bill Carson
1997	The Shooter	Yes	No	No	as Ed Raymond
1997	Rapid Assault	Yes	No	No	as Sherman Scot
1997	Masseuse 2	Yes	Yes	No	as Peter Daniels
1997	Hybrid	Yes	No	Yes	
1997	Bikini Hoe-Down	Yes	No	Yes	as Roger Collins; Nicholas Medina
1998	The Prophet (a.k.a. The Capitol Conspiracy)	Yes	No	No	as Ed Raymond Sherman Scott
1998	Invisible Dad	Yes	Yes	No	
1998	Counter Measures	Yes	No	Yes	
1998	Little Miss Magic	Yes	Yes	Yes	
1998	Mom, Can I Keep Her?	Yes	No	Yes	
1998	Mom's Outta Sight	Yes	No	No	
1998	Billy Frankenstein	Yes	No	No	
1998	Dear Santa	Yes	No	No	as Peter Stewart
1999	Fugitive Mind	Yes	No	Yes	
1999	The Kid with X-ray Eyes	Yes	No	No	
1999	Active Stealth	Yes	No	No	
1999	Invisible Mom II	Yes	No	Yes	
1999	Scandal: On the Other Side	Yes	No	No	as Nick Medina
2000	Sideshow	Yes	No	No	
2000	Submerged	Yes	No	No	
2001	Mach 2	Yes	No	No	
2001	Kept	Yes	No	No	Uncredited
2001	Air Rage	Yes	No	No	
2001	Critical Mass	Yes	No	No	as Ed Raymond
2001	Venomous	Yes	No	No	as Ed Raymond
2001	ACW Wrestling's Wildest Matches!	Yes	No	Yes	as Sherman Scott; Freddie Valentine
2002	Stranded	Yes	No	No	
2002	Southern Discomfort: Wrestling on the Indie Circuit	Yes	Yes	Yes	as Freddy Valentine
2002	Thirteen Erotic Ghosts	Yes	Yes	Executive	as Roger Collins; Nicholas Medina; Peter Stewart
2003	Final Examination	Yes	No	No	as Ed Raymond
2003	Bikini Airways	Yes	No	No	as Nicholas Medina
2004	Genie in a String Bikini	Yes	Yes	Yes	as Nicholas Medina
2004	Tomb of the Werewolf	Yes	Yes	No	
2004	Bikini a Go-Go	Yes	Yes	No	as Nicholas Medina
2004	Bikini Cavegirl (a.k.a. Teenage Cavegirl)	Yes	Yes	No	as Nicholas Medina
2004	Bikini Round-Up (a.k.a. The Good, the Bad, and the Beautiful)	Yes	Yes	No	as Nicholas Medina
2005	Bikini Chain Gang	Yes	Yes	Associate	as Nicholas Medina
2005	Glass Trap	Yes	No	No	as Ed Raymond
2006	The Bikini Escort Company	Yes	Yes	Associate	as Nicholas Medina
2006	Ghost in a Teeny Bikini	Yes	Yes	No	as Nicholas Medina
2006	Bikini Girls from the Lost Planet	Yes	Yes	No	as Nicholas Medina
2006	Bikini Pirates (a.k.a. Ghost of the Pirate Queen, Harlots of the Caribbean)	Yes	Yes	No	as Nicholas Medina
2006	The Legend of William Tell	Yes	No	No	
2007	The Girl from B.I.K.I.N.I.	Yes	Yes	No	
2008	Solar Flare	Yes	No	No	
2008	Bikini Royale	Yes	Yes	No	
2009	Silent Venom	Yes	No	No	
2009	Dire Wolf	Yes	No	No	
2010	Twilight Vamps	Yes	Yes	Executive	
2010	Bikini Frankenstein	Yes	Yes	Executive	as Nicholas Medina
2010	Bikini Royale 2	Yes	Yes	No	as Nicholas Medina
2010	Housewives from Another World	Yes	Yes	No	as Nicholas Medina
2010	American Bandits: Frank and Jesse James	Yes	Yes	Yes	
2011	Super Shark	Yes	Yes	Yes	
2011	Little Witches	Yes	Yes	Executive	as Nicholas Medina
2011	Lady Chatterley's Ghost	Yes	Yes	Executive	as Nicholas Medina
2011	Knock Outs	Yes	Yes	Executive	as Nicholas Medina
2012	Collision Course	Yes	Yes	Yes	
2012	Busty Housewives of Beverly Hills	Yes	No	No	as Nicholas Medina
2012	Hatfields and McCoys: Bad Blood	Yes	Yes	Yes	
2012	Baby Dolls Behind Bars	Yes	No	No	
2013	All I Want for Christmas	Yes	No	Yes	
2013	Abner, the Invisible Dog	Yes	No	Yes	
2014	After Midnight	Yes	Yes	Yes	
2014	Christmas in Palm Springs	Yes	No	Yes	
2014	House of Secrets	Yes	No	Yes	
2016	Trial	Yes	No	No	
2016	Sniper: Special Ops	Yes	Yes	Yes	
2016	Accidental Switch	Yes	Yes	Yes	
2020	Dying for a Daughter	Yes	Yes	Yes	
2022	Piranha Women	Yes	Yes	No	

=== Television ===
TV Movies

Year	Title	Director	Writer	Producer	Notes
2004	Haunting Desires	Yes	Yes	No	as Nicholas Medina and Sherman Scott
2007	Nuclear Hurricane	Yes	No	No	n/a
2007	Bewitched Housewives	Yes	Yes	No	as Nicholas Medina
2007	Super Ninja Doll	Yes	No	No	as Nicholas Medina and Sherman Scott
2007	Girl with the Sex-Ray Eyes	Yes	Yes	No	as Nicholas Medina and Sherman Scott
2007	An Accidental Christmas	Yes	No	No	n/a
2008	Polar Opposites	Yes	No	No	n/a
2008	Bikini Royale	Yes	Yes	Yes	as Nicholas Medina
2008	Voodoo Dollz	Yes	Yes	Yes	as Nicholas Medina
2008	Tarzeena, Queen of Kong Island	Yes	No	No	as Nicholas Medina
2009	Reptisaurus	No	No	Yes	n/a
2010	Turbulent Skies	Yes	Yes	Yes	n/a
2010	Bikini Jones and the Temple of Eros	Yes	Yes	Yes	as Nicholas Medina
2011	Bikini Warriors	Yes	Yes	Yes	as Nicholas Juan Medina
2011	Lady Chatterley's Daughter	Yes	Yes	Yes	as Nicholas Juan Medina and Mark Reynolds
2011	Bikini Time Machine	Yes	Yes	Yes	as Nicholas Juan Medina
2011	Sexual Witchcraft	Yes	Yes	Yes	as Nicholas Juan Medina
2012	Dirty Blondes from Beyond	Yes	No	No	as Nicholas Medina
2012	Jersey Shore Shark Attack	No	No	Yes	n/a
2012	A Christmas Wedding Date	Yes	Yes	Yes	n/a
2013	Holiday Road Trip	Yes	No	Yes	n/a
2013	All I Want For Christmas	Yes	No	Yes	n/a
2014	A Perfect Christmas List	Yes	Yes	Yes	n/a
2015	Eyewitness	Yes	Yes	Yes	n/a
2015	A Prince for Christmas	Yes	Yes	Yes	n/a
2015	The Christmas Gift	Yes	Yes	Yes	n/a
2016	A Mother's Revenge	Yes	Yes	Yes	n/a
2016	Unwanted Guests	Yes	No	No	n/a
2016	A Christmas in Vermont	Yes	Yes	Yes	n/a
2017	The Twin	Yes	No	Yes	n/a
2017	Stage Fright	Yes	No	No	n/a
2017	Deadly Vows	Yes	No	No	n/a
2017	Framed by My Fiancé	Yes	No	Yes	n/a
2018	Witness Unprotected	Yes	Yes	Yes	n/a
2018	Fiancé Killer	Yes	No	No	n/a
2018	Deadly Shores	Yes	No	Yes	n/a
2018	A Wedding For Christmas	Yes	No	Yes	n/a
2018	A Christmas In Royal Fashion	Yes	Yes	Yes	n/a
2019	Sister of the Bride	Yes	No	No	Uncredited
2019	One Fine Christmas	Yes	Yes	Yes	n/a
2019	Baking Christmas	Yes	No	Yes	n/a
2019	A Christmas Princess	Yes	Yes	Yes	n/a
2020	A Mother's Secret	Yes	Yes	Yes	n/a
2020	A Royal Christmas Engagement	Yes	No	No	n/a
2021	The Killer in My Backyard	Yes	No	Yes	n/a
2022	A Royal Christmas on Ice	Yes	Yes	Yes	n/a
2022	Dognapped: Hound for the Holidays	Yes	No	Yes	n/a

TV Series

Year	Title	Director	Writer	Producer	Notes
2000	Emmanuelle 2000	Yes	No	No	as Nicholas Medina, Episode: Emmanuelle's Sensual Pleasures
2002	Sexy Urban Legends	Yes	No	No	2 Episodes
2006–2007	Dante's Cove	No	No	Yes	Supervising Producer
2007–2009	The Lair	Yes	Yes	Yes	Creator, Executive Producer
2018–2020	The Bay	No	No	Yes	Co-executive producer
2019	Boggy Creek - The Bigfoot Series	No	Yes	Yes	Executive Producer

== See also ==
- Sam Newfield, a filmmaker who uses the "Sherman Scott" and "Peter Stewart" pseudonyms.
- Brad Linaweaver, science fiction writer, publisher, and frequent Ray collaborator.
