= Linnea Quigley filmography =

Linnea Quigley is an American actress, film producer, model, singer and author.

== Feature films ==
Year	Title	Role	Notes	Ref(s)
1975	Psycho From Texas	Barmaid	Quigley appeared in the 1978 edit of the film known under the titles The Mama's Boy, The Hurting or Psycho from Texas	
1978	Deathsport	Courtesan	Uncredited	
1978	Fairy Tales	Sleeping Beauty		
1978	Auditions	Sally Webster		
1979	Summer Camp	Pam	Credited as Barbara Gold	
1979	Stone Cold Dead	First Victim	Uncredited	
1979	Tourist Trap	Mannequin	Uncredited	
1981	Graduation Day	Dolores		
1981	Don't Go Near the Park	Bondi's Mother		
1981	Nice Dreams	Blondie Group #2		
1983	The Black Room	Milly		
1983	Still Smokin	Blonde In Spa	Uncredited	
1983	Get Crazy	Groupie	Uncredited	
1983	Young Warriors	Ginger		
1983	Nudes in Limbo	Model	Uncredited	
1984	Savage Streets	Heather		
1984	Silent Night, Deadly Night	Denise		
1984	Party Games for Adults	Various Roles		
1984	Fatal Games	Athlete		
1985	Kidnapped Girls Agency	Cathy Messenger	Credited as Jessie Dalton	
1985	The Return of the Living Dead	"Trash"		
1986	Stalked!		Credited as Jessie Dalton	
1986	Scorpion	Lea Johns / "The Scorpion"	Credited as Jessie Dalton	
1986	Avenged	Carol "C.C." Chambers	Credited as Jessie Dalton	
1986	Sweethearts	Cupid's Corner Host	Credited as Pamela Peck	
1986	Beverly Hills Girls	Linnea	Credited as Linnea La Stray	
1987	Flash!		Credited as Jessie Dalton	
1987	Creepozoids	Blanca		
1987	Treasure of the Moon Goddess	Lu De Belle		
1988	Sorority Babes in the Slimeball Bowl-O-Rama	"Spider"		
1988	Nightmare Sisters	Melody		
1988	Hollywood Chainsaw Hookers	Samantha		
1988	Night of the Demons	Suzanne		
1988	Dead Heat	Zombie Go-Go Girl	Uncredited	
1988	A Nightmare on Elm Street 4: The Dream Master	Soul From Freddy's Chest		
1988	Vice Academy	Didi / Fluffer		
1989	Assault of the Party Nerds	Bambi		
1989	American Rampage	Paris Girl	Credited as Elizabeth MacIntosh	
1989	Dr. Alien	Rocker Chick #2		
1989	Deadly Embrace	Michelle Arno		
1989	Witchtrap	Ginger Kowalski		
1989	Murder Weapon	Dawn		
1989	Sexbomb	Phoebe Love	Credited as Linnea	
1989	Robot Ninja	Miss Barbeau		
1989	Blood Nasty	Wanda Dance		
1990	The Girl I Want	Teri		
1990	Vice Academy Part 2	Didi		
1990	Diggin' Up Business	Mona		
1990	Linnea Quigley's Horror Workout	Herself		
1991	Virgin High	Kathleen		
1991	The Guyver	Scream Queen		
1992	Innocent Blood	Nurse Nancy Smith		
1992	Blood Church	Julia Francine		
1993	Beach Babes from Beyond	Sally		
1994	Pumpkinhead II: Blood Wings	Nadine		
1994	Vampire Hunter			
1995	Assault of the Party Nerds 2: The Heavy Petting Detective	Bambi		
1995	Stripteaser	Waitress	Uncredited	
1995	Jack-O	Carolyn Miller		
1996	Fatal Frames	Wendy Williams		
1996	Sick-o-pathics	Scream Queen	Segment "Commercial: Dr. Riker's Hair Lotion"	
1997	Hollywood Cops	Ryder		
1998	Mari-Cookie and the Killer Tarantula	Tere		
1998	Phantoms	Woman In Room 204	Uncredited	
1998	Boogie Boy	Gretchen		
1998	Death Mask	Angel Wilson		
1998	Curse of the Lesbian Love Goddess			
1999	The Killer Eye	TV Shower Girl	Uncredited	
1999	Animals	Dana Miles-Evans		
1999	Moving Targets	District Attorney		
1999	Kolobos	Dorothy		
1999	Play It to the Bone	Overdosed Hooker	Uncredited	
2000	Sex Files: Pleasureville	Lilly "Texas Lilly"		
2000	Blind Target	Serena Erwin		
2001	Horrorvision	Photo Model	Uncredited	
2001	The Monster Man	Aunt Ruth		
2001	Venice Beach			
2001	Kannibal	Georgina Thereshkova		
2002	Scream Queen	Malicia Tombs		
2003	Charlie and Sadie	Sadie		
2003	Zombiegeddon	Principal Russo		
2003	Corpses Are Forever	Elli Kroger		
2004	The Rockville Slayer	Mary Burns		
2004	Super Hero Central	L.Q.		
2004	Frost	Sandra		
2005	Wolfsbayne	Nikki		
2005	The Naked Monster	Deaf Girl		
2005	Lost Girls	Faith		
2006	Hoodoo for Voodoo	Queen Marie		
2006	Whispers from a Shallow Grave	TV Announcer	Voice	
2006	Voices from the Grave	Sara Graves		
2007	Each Time I Kill	Aunt Belle		
2007	Pretty	Delia	Short film	
2008	The Adventures of Ace X and Kid Velvet	L.Q.		
2008	Spring Break Massacre	Deputy Michelle Hendricks		
2008	The Notorious Colonel Steel	Tommy		
2008	Legend Has It	Al's Mother		
2009	Vampitheatre	The Queen		
2009	Strangers Online	Mary		
2009	RiffRaff	Cousin Julie		
2009	It Came from Trafalgar	Marilyn Doe		
2009	Night of the Demons	Ballerina Lady		
2009	La Femme Vampir	Faith		
2010	Bloodstruck	Johnny's Mother		
2010	La Femme Vampir Volume 2	Faith		
2010	Night on Has Been Mountain	Cameo Appearance		
2010	Liquid Memories	Hooker's Mom	Voice - Short film	
2010	Dead End	Alex		
2011	Stripperland	Grandbo		
2011	Collapse	Mrs. Bell		
2012	Where the Dead Go to Die	Sophia's Mom	Anthology featuring Liquid Memories	
2012	1313 Cougar Cult	Clara		
2012	The Voices from Beyond	Sara Graves		
2012	Girls Gone Dead	Willie		
2012	Caesar and Otto's Deadly Xmas	Donna Blackstone		
2012	GrindHouse 2wo	Ilsa		
2012	Stella Buio	Stella Buio	Short film	
2012	Manson Rising	Rosemary LaBianca		
2013	The Trouble with Barry	Linnea		
2013	Post Mortem, America 2021	Lucille		
2013	Blood River	Agnes Jones		
2013	Miss Strangelove	Queen of The Dead		
2014	Virginia Obscura			
2014	They Came from the Ether	Widow Ann		
2014	Trophy Heads	Herself		
2014	Disciples	Raine / The Seraph		
2014	A Blood Story	Margaret Renke		
2014	Bigfoot vs. D.B. Cooper	Flight Attendant		
2014	Demonica	Gypsy Woman		
2014	3 Scream Queens	Alexis		
2015	Terror Toons 3	Richmond		
2015	Cabaret Diabolique	Amy		
2015	A Blood Story	Margaret Renke		
2015	The Unquenchable Thirst for Beau Nerjoose	Esmerelda		
2015	Terror Toons 4	Richmond		
2015	Hunters	Susan		
2015	Blood Wings			
2016	The Barn	Ms. Barnhart		
2017	Bonehill Road	Suzy		
2019	The Best Laid Plans	Lois		
2020	The Last Thanksgiving	Paulette		
2020	In Search of Darkness: Part II	Herself	Documentary	
2021	New York Ninja	Randi Rydell	Voice	
2022	The Barn Part 2	Ms. Barnhart		

== Television ==
Year	Title	Role	Notes	Ref(s)
1983	Simon & Simon	Bobbi	Season 3, episode 8: "The Bare Facts"	
1995	Burial of the Rats	Rat Woman	TV film	
2010	Diary of Death	Mamma		
