= Haunted Garage =

Horror punk/metal band from Los Angeles

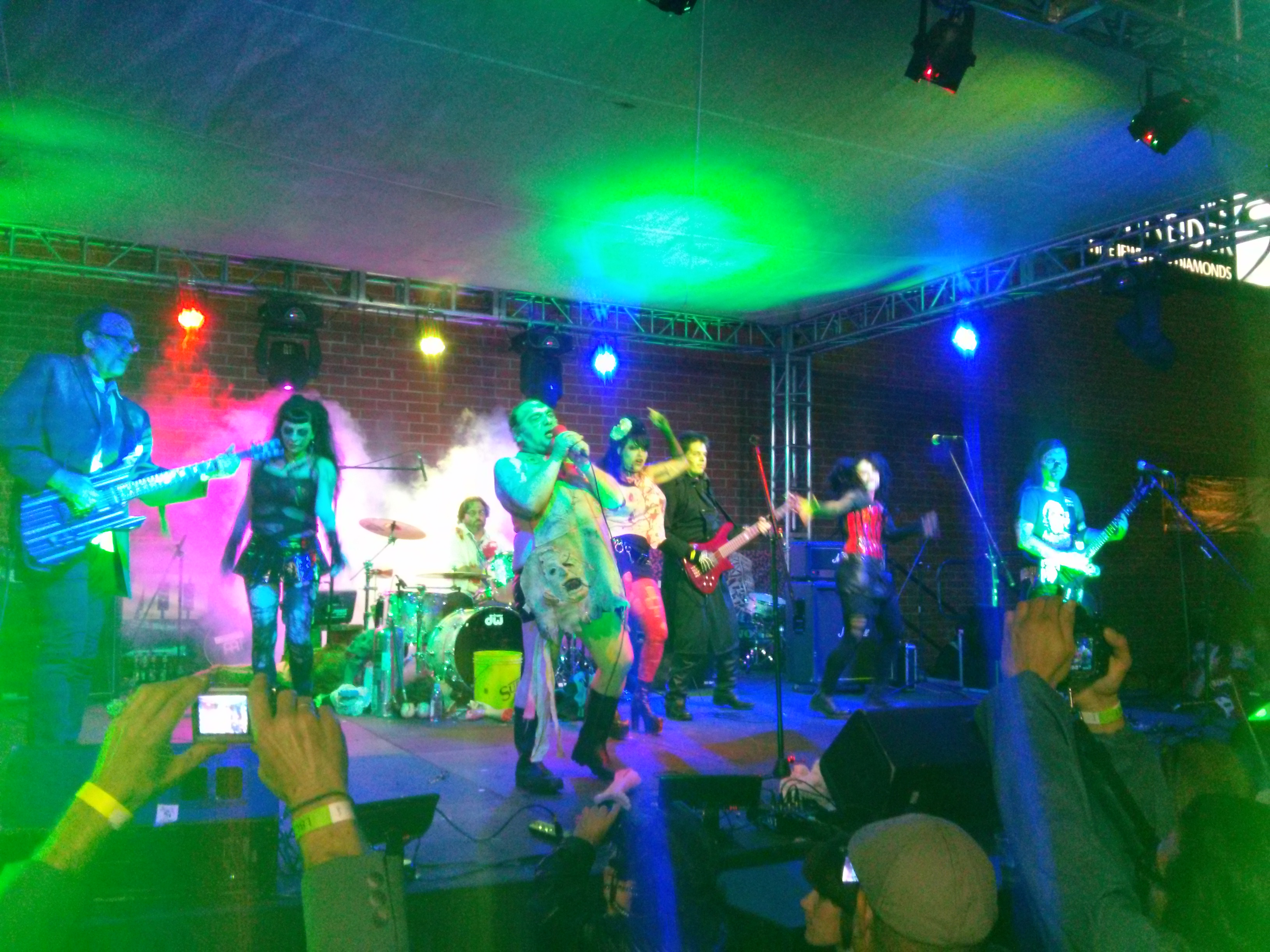
- Haunted Garage performing a reunion show at the Long Beach Zombie Walk in October 2013

Background information
- Origin: Los Angeles, California
- Genres: Horror punk, heavy metal, garage rock
- Years active: 1985–1993; 1995, 2001, 2008; 2013–2021
- Labels: Sympathy for the Record Industry, Metal Blade Records
- Members: Dukey Flyswatter; Erik Erath; Andy Chavez; Brian Beaver; Paddy Rowan

Haunted Garage was a horror punk and heavy metal band formed in Los Angeles in 1985. Fronted by singer and B-movie actor Dukey Flyswatter, the band were recognized for their campy horror and science fiction-inspired songs and outrageous shock rock live shows featuring macabre props and costumes, go-go dancers and copious amounts of stage blood.

The original incarnation of Haunted Garage lasted from 1985 to 1993, becoming a popular draw in the Los Angeles metal scene and recording one studio album for Metal Blade Records in 1991. Following several one-off reunions with varying line-ups, a new version of Haunted Garage featuring Flyswatter as its only original member formed in 2013, returning to touring and recording before officially retiring in late 2021.

== Biography ==
=== Formation and original line-up (1985–1993) ===
Haunted Garage was formed in 1985 by singer Dukey Flyswatter, bassist Ace McCoomba and guitarist Nyck Varoom. Originally, the band began playing music in a psychedelic rock and rockabilly style, playing covers of songs from vintage B-movies such the title theme from The Blob and "The South is Gonna Rise Again" from Two Thousand Maniacs! before eventually writing original material in a similarly tongue-in-cheek horror film-inspired vein. Following the addition of transvestite lead guitarist Gaby Godhead and drummer Stiff Slug, Haunted Garage's sound evolved into a more aggressive fusion of horror punk and heavy metal, a mix which the Los Angeles Times described as "The Dickies doing Alice Cooper" but which Flyswatter often referred to as "splatter punk".

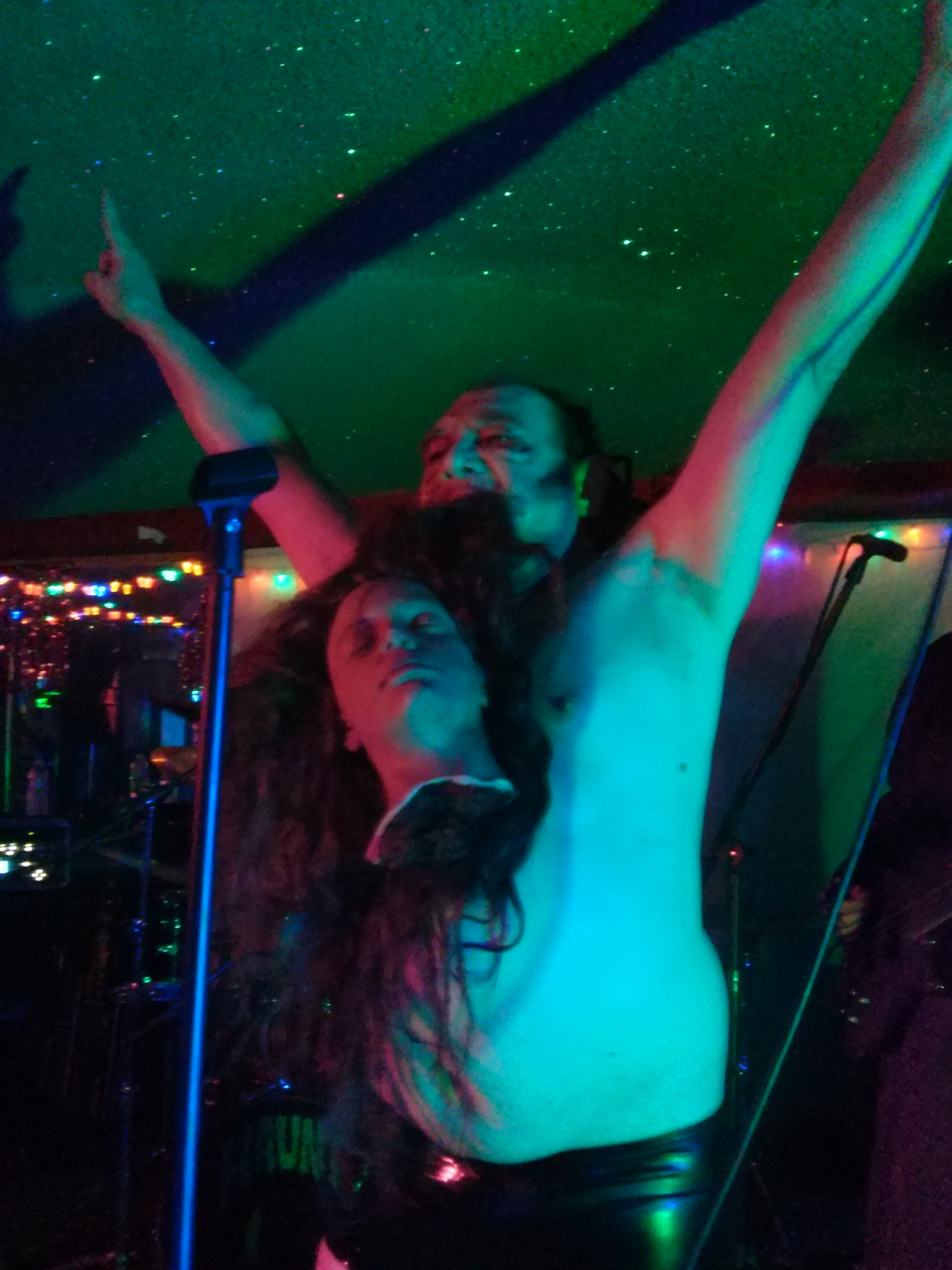
Dukey Flyswatter at a reunion show in November 2013.

Haunted Garage was most recognized, however, for their over-the-top shock rock stage shows, featuring violent and surrealist theatrics which LA Weekly wrote made them "local horror-punk legends". Similar to bands such as Gwar, their shows regularly showcased an array of elaborate horror-themed costumes and props, with copious amounts of fake blood and slime sprayed into the audience while a collection of scantily-clad female dancers - dubbed "The Gore Gore Girls" - maintained a permanent stage presence beside the band. Dukey Flyswatter would often use hatpins to pierce various parts of his body onstage before settling on his trademark schtick, sticking mousetraps on his face. These flamboyant antics helped the band maintain a visible presence in the Los Angeles scene, performing with such high-profile bands such as The Cramps, the Butthole Surfers, Gwar, Misfits, White Zombie and Screamin' Jay Hawkins and regularly playing and headlining such famous nightclubs as the Whisky a Go Go, The Roxy Theatre and Raji's. In a 2013 interview, Tool drummer Danny Carey reminisced about a late '80s concert with Haunted Garage, Green Jellÿ and Pygmy Love Circus - "the three kind of big psycho bands of L.A." - as one of his most memorable shows.

In addition to the band's horror movie-inspired aesthetic, frontman Dukey Flyswatter worked on many low-budget B movies during his tenure with Haunted Garage, acting in numerous films including the cult classics Surf Nazis Must Die, Sorority Babes in the Slimeball Bowl-O-Rama and Hollywood Chainsaw Hookers, as well as writing the screenplays for Blood Diner and Fred Olen Ray's Prison Ship and Commando Squad, among others. In 1987, Haunted Garage contributed several exclusive songs for the soundtrack to the film Nightmare Sisters, which also featured Flyswatter in an acting role, and appeared onscreen as a band in 1987's Cyclone and 1989's Breakfast of Aliens. In 1992, the band appeared on an episode of The Montel Williams Show alongside Sean Brennan of London After Midnight and Vlad of Dark Theater in a special about gothic rock and the vampire subculture.

In 1989, after independently releasing the demo tape Songs About Satan & Other Stuff to Piss Your Parents Off, Haunted Garage released the four-song 7-inch EP Mothers Day on Sympathy for the Record Industry before signing to Metal Blade Records, releasing their first and only full-length album Possession Park in August 1991. Possession Park received generally positive reviews from critics, with AllMusic calling the album "extremely fun and outrageously entertaining", writing that the band "should have been a lot more well-known", while the Chicago Tribune, though deriding the band as "Gwar Junior", admitted of the album's macabre sense of humor, "[a]s cheesy as it is, it's good for a laugh". Following the album's release, Haunted Garage carried out a tour of the United States and Europe supporting The Cramps before ultimately breaking up, playing their "final" show at the Coconut Teaszer on November 25, 1992.

=== Subsequent reunions and retirement (1995–2021) ===
In the years following their disbandment, Flyswatter attempted several times to revive Haunted Garage with varying line-ups of old and new members, the first reunion taking place at the Whisky a Go Go in 1995. In 2001, after contributing music to the Full Moon Features zombie film The Dead Hate the Living!, Flyswatter and Godhead reformed the band again for a reunion show, appearing on an episode of actor Clint Howard's short-lived web series The Clint Howard Variety Show to announce their intentions of returning to touring and recording, though these plans ultimately never came to fruition. Haunted Garage's last one-off reunion show was held at Safari Sam's in Los Angeles on June 16, 2008, marking the final time Godhead performed with the band.

In 2013, Flyswatter formed a new version of Haunted Garage with himself as the sole original member, performing the first of a series of shows at Los Angeles' California Institute of Abnormalarts on October 5, 2013, followed by a co-headlining appearance alongside The Dickies at the Long Beach Zombie Walk. This incarnation of the band continued performing regularly throughout the Los Angeles area, and in August 2015, began recording an EP under the production of Paul Roessler, Haunted Garage's first recorded material in twelve years and first studio release since 1991. The EP, entitled Slenderman and Other Strange Tales, was released digitally on major streaming and download sites on January 13, 2016, with a physical CD release the following April. The album's title song, based on the creepypasta legend Slender Man and its associated 2012 stabbing case, received some minor media attention in the wake of the 2016 HBO documentary Beware the Slenderman. In 2020, an expanded version of Slenderman featuring newly recorded songs was issued on vinyl by Metal Assault Records. The band was on pause while the singer removed an eye tumor through surgery.

On December 10, 2018, Dukey Flyswatter underwent brain surgery to remove a tumor near his visual cortex, for which Haunted Garage—including Flyswatter—performed a benefit show only several days prior on December 1. As detailed on the band's official Facebook page, though Flyswatter's tumor was successfully removed and declared benign by doctors, band activity would slow significantly as he remained in recovery. Flyswatter eventually returned to performing live with Haunted Garage the following spring, headlining two shows in Los Angeles on May 18, 2019, and Tarzana on August 31, 2019.

In the summer of 2021, Haunted Garage's social media revealed that a documentary film about Flyswatter and the band tentatively titled The Life and Slimes of Dukey Flyswatter and Haunted Garage was in production, which would feature interviews with many people involved in Flyswatter's film and music career, including Haunted Garage's original members. On August 21, 2021, Haunted Garage performed what was advertised as their final public show, playing a mini-set of four songs following punk rock band the Dwarves at Green Jellÿ's Hollywood studio.

== Discography ==
Studio albums

Year	Title	Label	Notes
1991	Possession Park	Metal Blade Records	
2020	Slenderman and Other Strange Tales	Metal Assault Records	Expanded LP edition of 2016 EP

EPs and Demos

Year	Title	Label	Notes
1989	Songs About Satan & Other Stuff to Piss Your Parents Off	Crawling Ear Music	Demo tape
1989	Mother's Day	Sympathy for the Record Industry	Four-song EP released on cassette and double-7"
2016	Slenderman and Other Strange Tales	Self-released	Six-song EP produced by Paul Roessler

Singles

Year	Song	Source
1991	"976-KILL" (CD)	Metal Blade Records
1991	"Welcome to Hell" (CD)	Metal Blade Records

Compilation appearances

Year	Song	Source
1990	"Dead and Gone"	Rock Climbers: Hottest of Hollywood (Sting's Ray Records)
1990	"My Disciple"	Tantrum Compilation (Cocktail Records)
1993	"Halo of Flies"	Welcome to Our Nightmare: A Tribute to Alice Cooper (Triple X Records)
2019	"Surf Nazis Must Die"	Metal Assault Mixtape - Vol. 1 (Metal Assault Records)

Soundtrack appearances

- Cyclone (1987)
- Nightmare Sisters (1987)
- Breakfast of Aliens (1989)
- The Dead Hate the Living! (2000)
- Night of the Demons (2009)

== Members ==
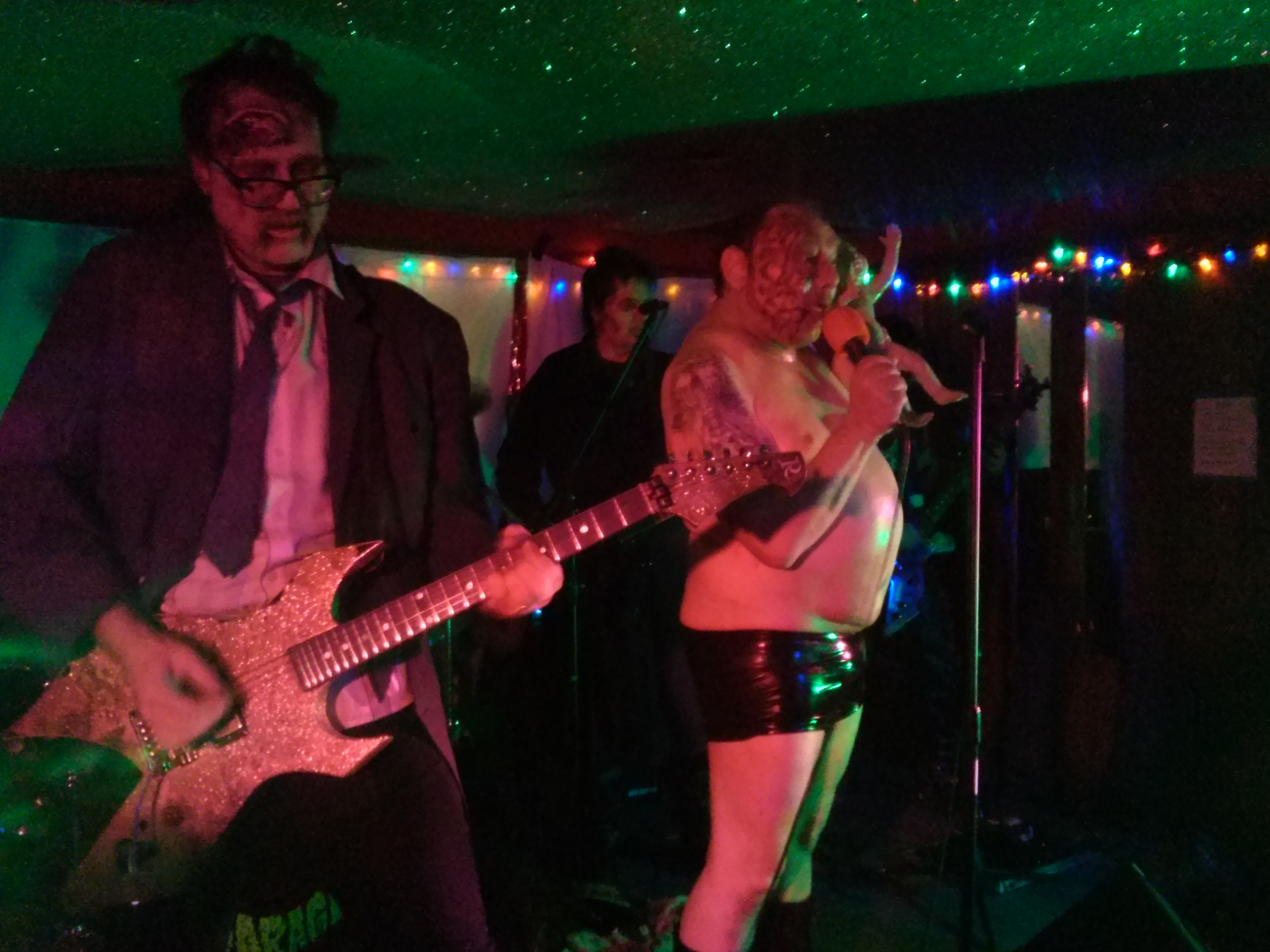
Haunted Garage in 2013, highlighting guitarist Erik Erath, who joined the band in 2001, and singer and co-founder Dukey Flyswatter.

Classic line-up (1989-1993)

- Dukey Flyswatter - lead vocals
- Gaby Godhead - lead guitar
- Johnny Ho - rhythm guitar
- King Dinosaur - bass guitar, backing vocals
- Stiff Slug - drums

Final line-up (2013–2021)

- Dukey Flyswatter - lead vocals
- Satan (Andy Chavez) - lead and rhythm guitar, backing vocals
- Erik E. Wrath (Eric Erath) - lead and rhythm guitar
- The Beaver (Brian Beaver) - drums
- Deathro Tull (Pat Rowan) - bass guitar, backing vocals

Former members

- Danny Dorman
- Nyck Varoom
- Joe Ramirez
- Jonnie Hell
- Mark Conn
- Mikaleno Admuson
- Ace McCoomba
- Sean Fodor
