= Head Case (disambiguation) =

Head Case is a 2000s American sitcom.

Head Case may also refer to:

- Head Case (film), a 2007 horror film
- "Head Case" (CSI: Miami), a 2009 television episode
- "Head Case" (Will & Grace), a 1998 television episode
- Head Cases, an American legal comedy drama television series
- Head Cases: Serial Killers in the Delaware Valley, a 2013 horror film
- Headcases, a British satirical animation television series
