= Dukey Flyswatter =

American actor (born 1954)

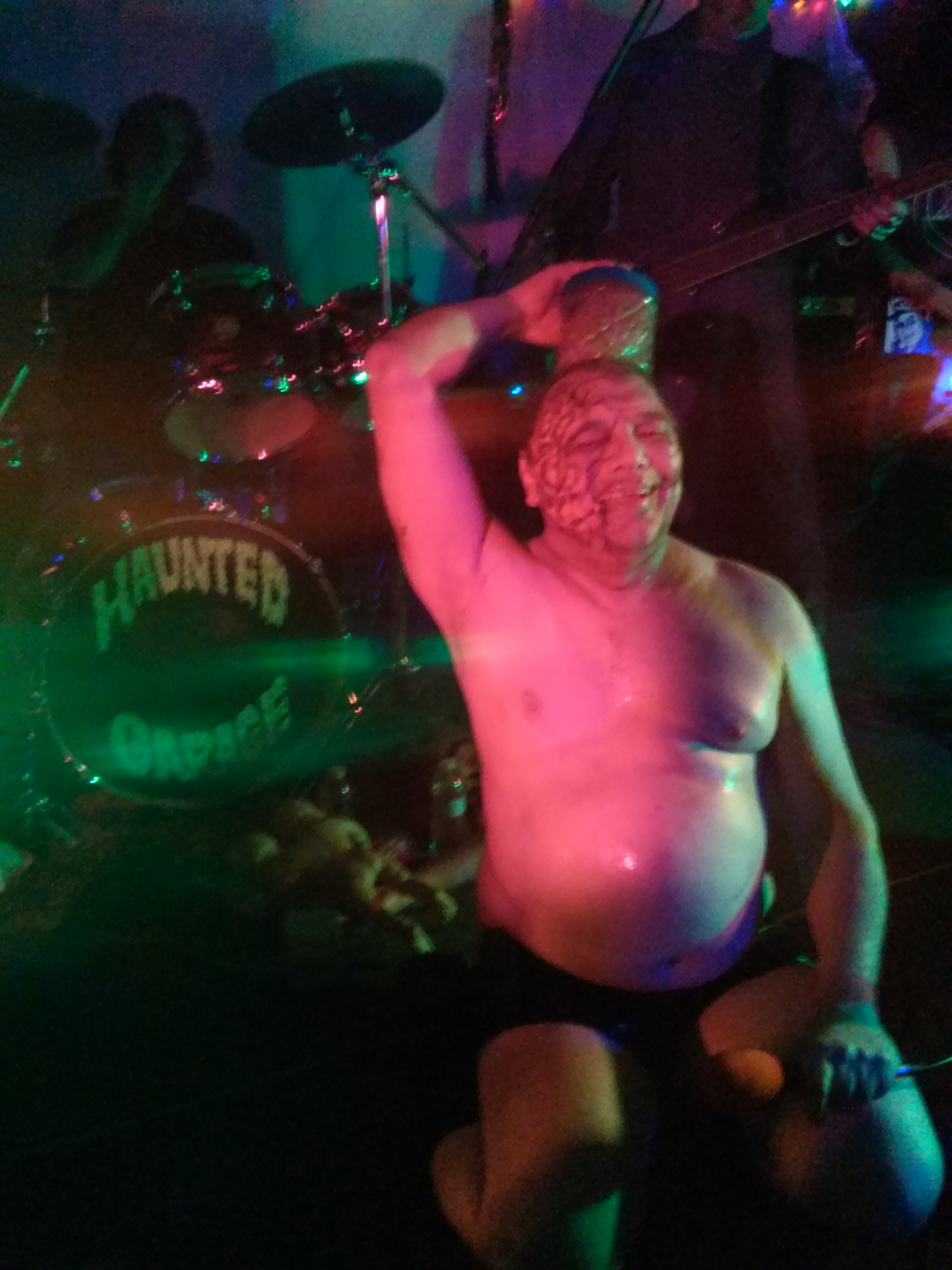
- Flyswatter in 2013.
- Born: Michael David Sonye; April 22, 1954 (age 72)
- Occupations: Actor, screenwriter, musician
- Years active: 1975–present

Michael David Sonye (/ˈsʌni/; born April 22, 1954), best known by his stage and screen name Dukey Flyswatter, is an American actor, screenwriter, and musician, recognized for his work on numerous low-budget B movies and as singer for the Los Angeles horror punk band Haunted Garage.

== Career ==
=== Film ===
Flyswatter first began acting as a teenager in community theatre, where at one point he received improvisation lessons from Del Close. His earliest screen credit came in 1975, when he worked as a script doctor on a draft of the screenplay for the horror film Frozen Scream, which was famously listed as one of the original "video nasties"; though the film was not banned outright, it still remains unreleased in the United Kingdom. Nearly a decade later, Flyswatter struck up a partnership with prolific low-budget director Fred Olen Ray. With Ray, Flyswatter penned the screenplays for his films Prison Ship and Commando Squad, both of which he acted in, and appeared in minor roles in films including The Tomb, Cyclone and Hollywood Chainsaw Hookers.

In 1987, Flyswatter wrote the screenplay for the campy horror comedy Blood Diner. A loose remake of the 1963 Herschell Gordon Lewis film Blood Feast, Blood Diner has since been dubbed a "cult classic" by horror fans and websites such as Dread Central, HorrorNews.net and GeekNation. The same year, he appeared in a co-starring role as the villainous Mengele in the infamous Troma-produced Surf Nazis Must Die, itself also considered a "cult classic", albeit as one of the worst movies ever made. In 1988, Flyswatter provided the voice of Uncle Impie, the primary puppet antagonist of David DeCoteau's Sorority Babes in the Slimeball Bowl-O-Rama.

Since the 1990s, Flyswatter has mostly played cameos in smaller-budgeted independent horror films, though also appeared in a string of adult films playing comedic non-sex roles such as "The Clit Master" in the Extreme Associates film Terrors from the Clit and "P. T. Bone 'Em" in the superhero parody Super Quick 2, the latter of which earned him a nomination for "Best Non-Sex Performance – Film or Video" at the 2002 AVN Awards. In 2004, Flyswatter had a major role playing fetish filmmaker Irving Klaw in the Bettie Page biopic Bettie Page: Dark Angel.

=== Music ===
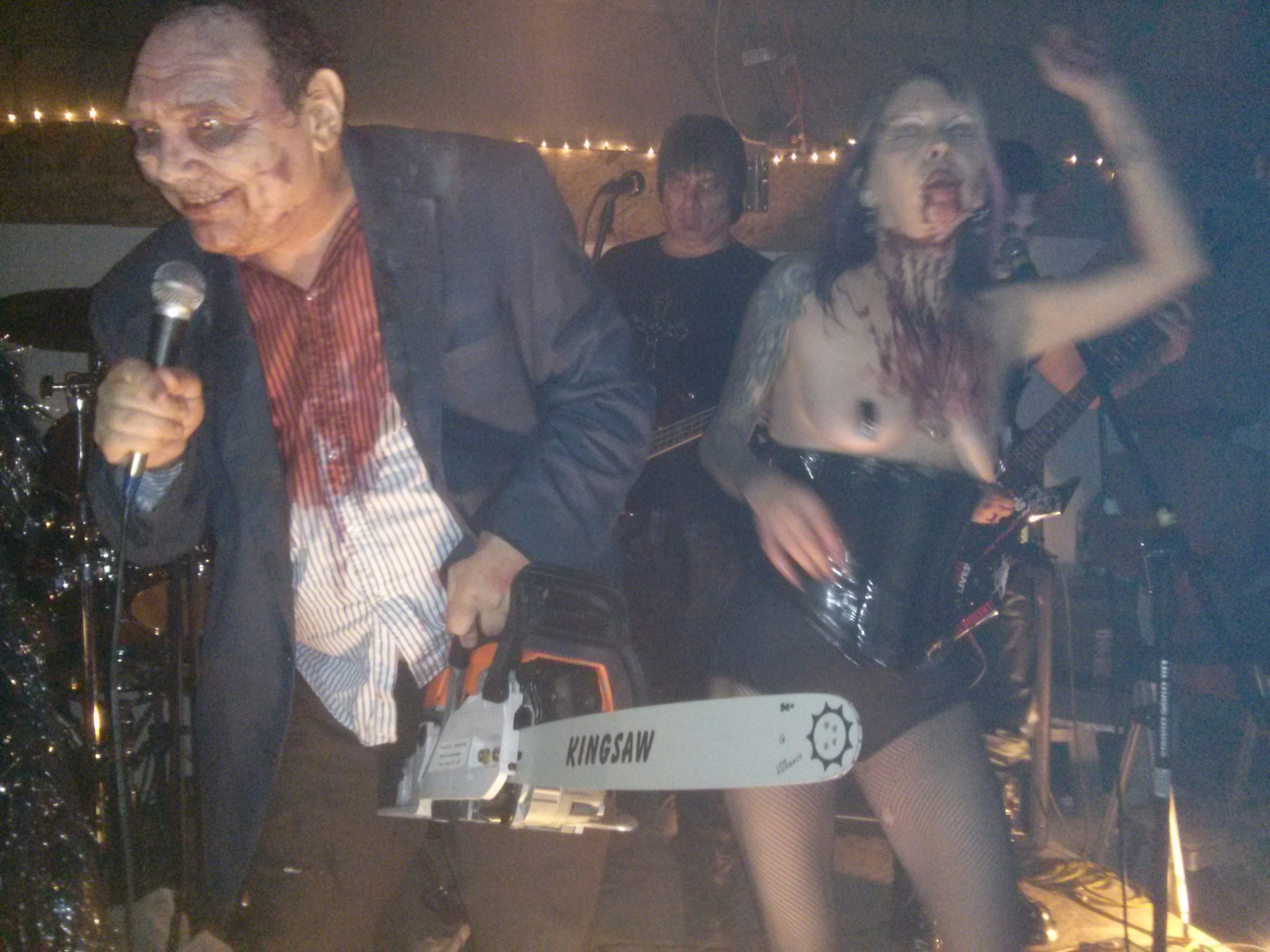
Flyswatter performing with Haunted Garage in March 2014.

In 1985, Flyswatter formed the horror punk/heavy metal band Haunted Garage in Los Angeles, where he filled the role of lyricist and lead singer at the behest of the band's bassist – as he recalled in a 2013 interview, "I hadn't done any singing, except [while] being drunk". It was during the formation of the band that he created his Dukey Flyswatter nickname and stage persona. Wanting to be an "Isaac Hayes/Escape from N.Y./Duke of LA-type character", he adopted the name "Dukey", while "Flyswatter" was suggested by a bandmate. As he said in a 2012 interview, "Michael Sonye was gone and Dukey Flyswatter stayed...Michael Sonye was the reserved one and Dukey Flyswatter was the persona, the artist, and he was really out there".

Noted for their bloody and prop-filled live shows, irreverent B movie-inspired lyrics and Flyswatter's manic shock rock stage antics, Haunted Garage became a prominent fixture in the Los Angeles underground throughout the late 1980s and early 1990s, recording music for and appearing onscreen in several low-budget horror films including Cyclone and Nightmare Sisters before eventually signing to Metal Blade Records to release their sole LP Possession Park in 1991. Following their disbandment in 1993, Flyswatter sang in several other groups including the cross-dressing riot grrrrl parody band Fox Twat, the Dead Kennedys tribute Hemorrhoid in Cambodia and the Dead Boys tribute Moronic Reducer, the latter of which was showcased in the 2001 tribute band documentary Tributary: A Study of an American Pop Culture Subculture. During the 2010s, Flyswatter fronted another Dead Kennedys tribute band, the zombie-themed Undead Kennedys, which, in 2015, was ranked 14th on LA Weekly's list of the top 20 tribute bands in Los Angeles.

After a series of one-off reunion shows spanning from 1995 to 2008, Haunted Garage re-formed in 2013 with an all new line-up, featuring Flyswatter as the only original member. In 2016, with producer Paul Roessler, the band released the EP Slenderman and Other Strange Tales, their first studio release in twenty five years. The EP was re-issued on vinyl in 2020, featuring two newly-recorded tracks.

=== Other endeavors ===
In 1991, Flyswatter made a cameo appearance in the music video for Green Jellÿ's "The Misadventures of Shitman", which was later released on their video tape Cereal Killer. In 1992, he appeared with Haunted Garage on The Montel Williams Show alongside Sean Brennan of London After Midnight in a special about gothic rock and the vampire subculture. Flyswatter's eyeball is featured as the cover of Transmissions from Planet Awesome, a 1998 album by punk rock band ADZ, a side project of Adolescents singer Tony Cadena. ADZ additionally recorded a song called "Flyswatter" in tribute to him which appeared on the 1999 compilation Odz 'n' Sodz.

Flyswatter has also appeared in numerous projects by the comedy punk band the Radioactive Chicken Heads, including a cameo appearance in their 2013 music video "Atom the Amazing Zombie Killer" and portraying Elvis Presley in their 2015 stage play The Radioactive Chicken Heads Tanksgiving Special at The Steve Allen Theater. For the release of the band's 2017 concept album Tales From The Coop, Flyswatter played the role of the narrative's antagonist Dr. Baron von Kluckinstein, contributing vocals to the album and playing the character in the Chicken Heads' accompanying television pilot The Radioactive Chicken Heads Show.

Flyswatter is an avid fan and collector of vintage horror and exploitation cinema, and served as a creative consultant on Fred Olen Ray's 1985 Sleazemania!, a video compilation of exploitation trailers from the 1930s through the 1960s. He has written articles about horror and Halloween-related media and events for The Los Angeles Beat, and has also written several unproduced scripts and projects.

At one point, a nude portrait of Flyswatter as the god Pan painted by lowbrow artist Stacy Lande was hung in the home of Clive Barker.

In late 2018, it was announced that Flyswatter would receive brain surgery to remove a tumor near his visual cortex, for which Haunted Garage performed a benefit show nine days prior to his surgery. As detailed on the band's social media, the tumor was successfully removed and declared benign, and Flyswatter returned to performing live with Haunted Garage just six months later with a show in Los Angeles on May 18, 2019.

== Filmography ==
=== As actor ===
Year	Film	Role	Notes
1986	Cards of Death		Shot on video feature film.
1986	Prison Ship	Krago	AKA Star Slammer. Directed by Fred Olen Ray
1986	The Tomb	Waiter	Directed by Fred Olen Ray
1987	Commando Squad		Directed by Fred Olen Ray
1987	Cyclone	Haunted Garage	Directed by Fred Olen Ray
1987	Surf Nazis Must Die	Mengele	Directed by Peter George
1988	Sorority Babes in the Slimeball Bowl-O-Rama	Uncle Impie (the Imp)	Directed by David DeCoteau
1988	Hollywood Chainsaw Hookers	Jake the Bartender	Directed by Fred Olen Ray
1988	Nightmare Sisters	Omar	Directed by David DeCoteau
1988	The Phantom Empire	Picnic Guy	Directed by Fred Olen Ray
1989	Disgusting Space Worms Eat Everyone!!	Ziegler	Shot on video feature film.
1989	Roller Blade Warriors: Taken By Force	Karp	Directed by Donald G. Jackson
1990	Dark Romances, Vol. 1	Nightmare Man	
1991	Shock Cinema Vol. 3	Self (interviewee)	Documentary film on low-budget horror cinema
1993	Breakfast of Aliens	Singer for Haunted Garage	Directed by David Lee Miller
1995	Lord of Illusions	Cultist	Directed by Clive Barker
1998	Terrors from the Clit	The Clit Master	Adult film. Directed by Slaine Wayne
1998	Zombie Toxin		
1999	Cool Air	Street Bum	Short film based on H. P. Lovecraft's "Cool Air"
1999	Debbie Does Damnation		
2000	Callgirls Undercover 3		Adult film
2001	Terrors from the Clit 2	Dukey, the Clit Master	Adult film. Directed by Slain Wayne.
2001	Super Quick 2	P. T. Bone 'Em	Adult film. Nominated for Best Non-Sex Performance at the 2002 AVN Awards
2001	Wally Wanker's Candy Fuctory		Adult film
2002	Deathbed	Ghost Man	
2004	Bettie Page: Dark Angel	Irving Klaw	Directed by Nico B.
2006	Dorm of the Dead	Alf	
2009	Chatterbox: Biography of a Bar, San Francisco 1986-1990	Himself (interviewee)	Documentary film on the San Francisco punk rock club The Chatterbox.
2009	The Crystal Lake Massacres Revisited	Himself	Mockumentary featured on several Friday the 13th DVDs.
2012	Reel Evil	Homeless Man	
2013	Lights Out	Harry the Homeowner	Short film
2013	That $#!% Will Rot Your Brain: How the Monster Kids Transformed Popular Culture	Himself (interviewee)	Documentary film on Shock Theater directed by Robert Tinnell
2016	Grindsploitation	Hamburger	
2017	The Radioactive Chicken Heads Show	Dr. Baron von Kluckinstein	Television pilot; segment: "Pox"

=== As screenwriter ===
Year	Film	Notes
1975	Frozen Scream	with Doug Ferrin & Celeste Hammond
1986	Prison Ship	Story by Sonye, Fred Olen Ray & Miriam L. Preissel
1987	Blood Diner	
1987	Cold Steel	Story by Lisa M. Hansen, Dorothy Ann Puzo & Moe Quigley
1987	Commando Squad	
1989	Out on Bail	with Tom Badal & Jason Booth

=== As composer ===
All with Haunted Garage.

Year	Film
1987	Cyclone
1988	Nightmare Sisters
1990	Dark Romances, Vol. 2
2000	The Dead Hate the Living!
2009	Night of the Demons

== Discography ==
See Haunted Garage#Discography
