= Fatal Frames =

- Directed by: Al Festa
- Screenplay by: Alessandro Monese
- Story by: Al Festa; Alessandro Monese
- Produced by: Stefania Di Giandomenico
- Cinematography: Giuseppe Berardini
- Edited by: Maurizio Baglivo
- Music by: Al Festa
- Production company: Sail
- Release date: 1996
- Running time: 137 minutes
- Country: Italy

Fatal Frames (Italian: Fotogrammi mortali) is a 1996 Italian giallo film directed by music video director Al Festa. It stars his wife, singer Stefania Stella. The film is about the American music video director Alex Ritt (Rick Gianasi) who is hired to direct the latest Stefania Stella video in Rome. While there, he witnesses a brutal killing. By the time the police arrive, the body has vanished and no traces of blood are found. When Ritt witnesses a second murder with the same circumstances, he tries to discover the truth.

Fatal Frames was conceived by music video director Festa and his wife, the singer Stefania Stella. The two developed the film in the style of 1970s Italian thrillers. During filming, the film ran out of production money leading to filming being halted. During this period, two key actors died: Donald Pleasence and Rossano Brazzi. This led to the script being re-written with David Warbeck to fill in the gaps of these characters. The film received negative reviews on its release.

== Cast ==
Cast adapted from So Deadly, So Perverse Volume 2.

- Stefania Stella as Herself
- Rick Gianasi as Alex Ritt
- David Warbeck as Commissioner Bonelli
- Donald Pleasence as Professor Robinson
- Ugo Pagliai as Commissioner Valneti
- Alida Valli as Countess Alessandra Mirafiori
- Geoffrey Copleston as Mr Fairbrain
- Linnea Quigley as Wendy Williams
- Rossano Brazzi as Dr. Lucidi
- Ciccio Ingrassia as Beggar

== Production ==
Fatal Frames was conceived by Al Festa and Stefania Stella. Finding that the gialli was a genre in a slump, they decided to make a film to reflect the style and tones of 1970s-styled gialli while incorporating their own music into the film. Critic and film historian Roberto Curti described that this style had "almost totally vanished" from Italian cinema in the 1990s, and that it was confined to "bottom-of-the-barrel footnotes" such as Dario Micheli's Il gioco della notte (1993) and Pierfranceso Campanella's Bugie rosse (1994).

Fatal Frames began production in 1993. While filming into 1994, financing on the film dried up leading for production to shut down to find additional funds. While not filming, cast members Rossano Brazzi and Donald Pleasence died. Funding was found through Silvio Berlusconi's Media set production company, but re-writing had to be done on the film to deal with the death of two actors. This led to David Warbeck being drafted into the film, with his part being written to cover up for the death of the other two actors.

Festa's original edit of the film was two hours and 20 minutes, which was later cut down to two hours and five minutes.

== Release ==
Fatal Frames was released in 1996. It was released on DVD by Synapse.

Festa did not return to directing films until The Hermit in 2012.

== Reception ==
Film historian Troy Howarth described the film as receive "blistering reviews" on its initial release. In the 1999 book Blood & Black Lace, author Adrian Luther-Smith described the film as an "overblown trash epic", comparing it to Indian films which takes breaks from the narrative to feature extended dance and song sequences which he referred to as "bland numbers". Luther-Smith also commented that the film had a "flawed over-reliance on [an] oudated look", noting the blue and red filters used in the film. Troy Howarth, in his book So Deadly, So Perverse (2015) echoed Luther-Smiths's statements about the films breaks for music sequences, and stated that "all the references in the world are not enough to make for a compelling thriller" stating the writers forgot to include "interesting characters" describing the casting as "bizarre." Howarth also commented on the look of the film, stating that despite trying to emulate the looks of works by Mario Bava, Dario Argento and Lucio Fulci, the film was lit and edited like a music video. In his book overviewing Italian gialli, Curti declared the film to be "incoherent and naive, full of plot holes, and plagued by an unnecessary exhibition of flashy technique but desperately lacking suspense."

== See also ==
- Linnea Quigley filmography
- List of Italian films of 1996
