= Brinke Stevens =

American actress (born 1954)

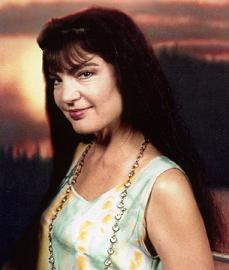
- Stevens in 2005
- Born: Charlene Elizabeth Brinkman; September 20, 1954 (age 72); San Diego, California, U.S.
- Education: San Diego State University; Scripps Institution of Oceanography
- Occupations: Actress; model; screenwriter
- Years active: 1972–present
- Height: 163 cm (5 ft 4 in)
- Spouse: Dave Stevens (m. 1980; div. 1981)
- Website: brinke.com

Signature
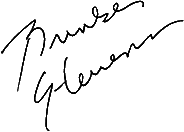

Brinke Stevens (born Charlene Elizabeth Brinkman, September 20, 1954) is an American actress. A native of San Diego, Stevens initially pursued a career as a marine biologist prior to becoming an actress, earning an undergraduate degree in biology from San Diego State University before studying marine biology at the Scripps Institution of Oceanography. Unable to find employment in the field of biology, Stevens began modeling in Los Angeles in 1980, and she worked as a film extra.

Her first major film role was in the slasher film The Slumber Party Massacre (1982). She went on to appear in a number of horror films, including Sorority Babes in the Slimeball Bowl-O-Rama (1988), Nightmare Sisters (1988), Grandmother's House (1988), and Mommy (1995).

In addition to acting, Stevens has co-written several films, including the comedy horror feature Teenage Exorcist (1991).

== Biography ==
=== Early life and education ===
Stevens was born Charlene Elizabeth Brinkman on September 20, 1954 in San Diego to Charles Brinkman II, and Lorraine Brinkman, an aircraft riveter. She is of German and Mongolian descent. Stevens was raised in Crest, California along with her brother, Kerry. She graduated from Granite Hills High School in El Cajon, and was a gifted student, becoming a member of Mensa International while still in high school. As a teenager, she was a fan of Star Trek, and frequently attended sci-fi-themed conventions. In 1974, Stevens attended San Diego Comic-Con and won first place in the first Masquerade Ball. She remained involved in running the masquerade at Comic-Con for years after her win.

She earned a B.S. degree in biology and psychology from San Diego State University before enrolling to study marine biology at the Scripps Institution of Oceanography in La Jolla, California, aspiring to become a marine biologist. Stevens planned to pursue a PhD at the institute, but was barred from completing when it was uncovered that she had incorporated dolphins at SeaWorld as part of her studies, violating the institute's authorization that had given her clearance only to study the vision of seals. Despite this, she was later granted an honorary doctorate.

=== Modeling and film beginnings ===
Stevens subsequently relocated with her then-husband, comic illustrator Dave Stevens (whom she met in college) to Los Angeles in 1980, and served as a model for the character of Betty in Stevens' comic series Rocketeer. After the couple divorced in 1981, Brinke, unable to find employment in the field of biology, began working as a film extra for income. Photographer Dan Golden saw a photograph of her in costume, and hired her for a non-speaking role in the student film Zyzak Is King (1980); he also later photographed her for the cover of the first issue of Femme Fatales (1992).

While leaving a modeling agency, Stevens stopped by an office door to look at film posters on the walls. The occupant, Jacob Bressler, told her to enter and asked for her portfolio. On the basis of that, he cast her in an uncredited, non-speaking role in ...All the Marbles (1981). Stevens' first speaking role was as Linda Dawn Grant in The Slumber Party Massacre (1982), a role she reprised in Cheerleader Massacre (2003).

Stevens has appeared in more than 100 feature films, primarily in the genres of horror, science fiction, and fantasy film. She has gained notoriety as a scream queen.

In addition to acting, Stevens has co-written a number of screenplays, co-produced two documentaries, and served as an onset decorator. She co-wrote Teenage Exorcist (1991), in which she also appeared.

=== Later work ===
Stevens portrayed Julie Quinn, mother of serial killer Wayne Montgomery, in the 2007 horror film Head Case. She reprised her role in the three sequels, 2009's The Ritual, 2010's Post-Mortem, and 2013's Head Cases: Serial Killers in the Delaware Valley.

Stevens is depicted in the horror novel Bad Moon Rising, the third installment of Jonathan Maberry's "Pine Deep" trilogy, alongside Jim O'Rear, Tom Savini, and Debbie Rochon, published in 2008.

More recently she has appeared in a 2009 documentary Pretty Bloody: The Women of Horror and appeared in the 2013 remake of Die Sister, Die!. Alongside regular co-stars Linnea Quigley, and Michelle Bauer, Stevens appeared in and was a main subject for the 2011 documentary Screaming in High Heels: The Rise & Fall of the Scream Queen Era and its 2020 follow up Screaming in High Heels: The Reunion.

Stevens narrated the 2021 SiriusXM podcast limited series, Comic-Con Begins: Origin Stories of the San Diego Comic-Con and the Rise of Modern Fandom.

== Filmography ==
| Year | Title | Role | Notes |
|---|---|---|---|
| 1972 | Necromancy | Black Sabbath Cult Member | Credited as Berinka Stevens |
| 1981 | ...All the Marbles | Extra | Uncredited |
| 1982 | The Slumber Party Massacre | Linda Dawn Grant | |
| 1983 | Private School | School Girl | Uncredited |
| 1983 | The Man Who Wasn't There | Nymphette | |
| 1984 | Sole Survivor | Jennifer | |
| 1984 | Body Double | Girl #3 In Bathroom | |
| 1984 | The Forgotten Ones | Mistress | |
| 1985 | 24 Hours to Midnight | Devon Grady | Voice |
| 1985 | Ninja Turf | Boss's Girlfriend | |
| 1987 | Slave Girls from Beyond Infinity | Shala | |
| 1988 | Sorority Babes in the Slimeball Bowl-O-Rama | "Taffy" | |
| 1988 | Nightmare Sisters | Marci | |
| 1988 | Grandmother's House | Woman | |
| 1988 | Warlords | Dow's Wife | |
| 1989 | The Jigsaw Murders | Stripper #1 | |
| 1989 | Transylvania Twist | Berry Lou | |
| 1990 | Chinatown Connection | Missy | |
| 1990 | Spirits | Amy Goldwyn | |
| 1990 | Bad Girls from Mars | Myra | |
| 1991 | My Lovely Monster | Party Guest | |
| 1991 | Shadows in the City | Fortune Teller | |
| 1991 | Scream Queen Hot Tub Party | Herself | Video |
| 1992 | Roots of Evil | Candy | |
| 1991 | Teenage Exorcist | Diane | Also writer |
| 1992 | Munchie | Band Member | |
| 1993 | Acting on Impulse | The Waitress | TV movie |
| 1995 | Droid Gunner | "Kitten" | |
| 1995 | Jack-O | Witch | |
| 1995 | Mommy | Beth Conway | |
| 1996 | Masseuse | Hotel Manager | as C.B. Stevens |
| 1996 | Over the Wire | Jenny | as C.B. Stevens |
| 1996 | Theater Dark Video Magazine | Host | TV movie |
| 1996 | Repligator | Dr. Goodbody | |
| 1997 | Mommy 2: Mommy's Day | Beth Conway | |
| 1997 | Illicit Dreams 2 | Dianne | |
| 1999 | The Kid With X-Ray Eyes | Sexy Girl | |
| 2000 | Sideshow | Madame Volosca | |
| 2000 | Submerged | The Bartender | Uncredited |
| 2000 | Blood on the Backlot | Sabrina Morgan | Short |
| 2001 | Victoria's Shadow | Victoria | |
| 2001 | Eyes Are Upon You | Amanda | |
| 2001 | Real Time: Siege at Lucas Street Market | Janet | |
| 2002 | The Frightening | Mrs. Peterson | |
| 2002 | The Bad Father | "Shady" | Short |
| 2002 | Bleed | Mother | |
| 2003 | Cheerleader Massacre | Linda Dawn Grant | |
| 2003 | Deadly Stingers | Helen | |
| 2004 | Something to Scream About | Herself | |
| 2004 | Dead Clowns | Lilian, The Storyteller | |
| 2004 | Tele-Zombie | Wednesday Toogood | |
| 2005 | October Moon | Nancy | |
| 2006 | Speedbag | Grade School Teacher | |
| 2006 | Revenge Live | Mrs. Norris | |
| 2007 | The Two Sisters | Professor Renee Davis | |
| 2007 | Head Case | Julie | |
| 2007 | Sigma Die! | Mrs. Angleman | |
| 2008 | Her Morbid Desires | Brinke | |
| 2008 | October Moon 2: November Son | Nancy | |
| 2008 | Bryan Loves You | Nurse | |
| 2009 | Blood Siblings | Aunt Molly | |
| 2009 | The Ritual | Molly | |
| 2009 | Demon Divas and the Lanes of Damnation | Morgan / Morrigan | |
| 2009 | Caesar and Otto's Summer Camp Massacre | Sashi | |
| 2009 | George's Intervention | Judy | |
| 2009 | It Came From Trafalgar | Descenda Lou | |
| 2010 | Post-Mortem | Julie | |
| 2010 | Psychosomatika | Dr. Klopek | |
| 2010 | Bloodstruck | The Psychiatrist | |
| 2011 | Screaming in High Heels: The Rise & Fall of the Scream Queen Era | Herself (documentary) | |
| 2011 | Shy of Normal: Tales of New Life Experiences | Vinnie Judith Rosenberg | |
| 2011 | The Greatest Women of Horror and Sci Fi | Herself | Documentary |
| 2011 | Bleed 4 Me | Lady Jasmine | |
| 2011 | Bloody Mary 3D | Elle's Mother | Voice |
| 2011 | JustUs | Sheryl Black | Voice, Short |
| 2012 | The Summer Of Massacre | Mrs. Williams | |
| 2012 | No Strings 2: Playtime in Hell | Midnites Sister | |
| 2012 | Caesar and Otto's Deadly Christmas | Sashi | |
| 2012 | Jonah Lives | Zora | |
| 2013 | Axeman at Cutter's Creek | Sheriff Charlene Wopuzer | |
| 2013 | The Trouble with Barry | Brinke | |
| 2013 | Die Sister, Die! | Amanda Price | |
| 2013 | Head Cases: Serial Killers in the Delaware Valley | Julie Quinn | |
| 2013 | Lizzie Borden's Revenge | Abby Borden | |
| 2014 | Safe Inside | Betsy Kane | |
| 2014 | Disciples | Tatiana | |
| 2014 | 3 Scream Queens | Ellen | |
| 2015 | Terror Toons 3 | Pandora | |
| 2015 | Caesar and Otto's Paranormal Halloween | Sashi | |
| 2015 | Adam K | Mrs. Kraul | |
| 2015 | Night of Something Strange | Teacher | |
| 2015 | Ripped to Shreds | House Mother | |
| 2017 | Safe Inside | Betsy Kane | |
| 2017 | Death House | Head Staffer | |
| 2019 | RoboWoman | Evangeline | |
| 2020 | The Beast Beneath | Charlene Brinkeman | |
| 2021 | Apex Predators | Dr. Charlene Brinkman | |
| 2022 | Sorority Babes in the Slimeball Bowl-O-Rama 2 | "Taffy" | |
| 2023 | The Night Jane Went Insane | Jane | |
| 2023 | Butcher's Bluff | Mrs. Carpenter | |
| 2024 | House on Haunted Hill | Nora Manning | |
| 2024 | Space Sharks | Rochelle | |
| 2024 | The Haunted, The Possessed, and The Damned | Maureen Kraul | |
| 2024 | Camp Terror | Meghan Phelps | |
| 2024 | Spider Baby, or the Maddest Story Ever Told | Theresa Merrye | |
| 2024 | Side Effects May Vary | Mrs. Jackson | |
| 2025 | Amityville Apartment | Zelda | |
| 2025 | Ed Kemper | Sally Hallett | |
| 2025 | Dorothea | Ruth Monroe | |
| 2025 | Safe Inside 2 | Betsy Kane | |
| 2026 | Midnight 3 | Cynthia | |

== Sources ==
- Collum, Jason Paul (2015). Assault of the Killer B's: Interviews with 20 Cult Film Actresses. Jefferson, North Carolina: McFarland. ISBN 978-0-786-48041-8.
- Pitts, Michael R. (2002). Horror Film Stars (3rd ed.). Jefferson, North Carolina: McFarland. ISBN 978-0-786-41052-1.
