= Guy Moon =

American composer (1962–2026)

- Moon in 2024

Background information
- Born: Guy Vernon Moon; February 7, 1962; Madison, Wisconsin, U.S.
- Died: January 8, 2026 (aged 63) Wilmington, California, U.S.
- Genres: Film score; electronic; rock; house
- Occupation: Composer
- Instruments: Synthesizers; keyboards; drums; percussion
- Years active: 1987–2025

Guy Vernon Moon (February 7, 1962 – January 8, 2026) was an American composer who was known for composing music for various films and television productions, notably including the animated series The Fairly OddParents, Danny Phantom, Cow and Chicken, and Johnny Bravo. Moon graduated from the University of Arizona before starting his composition career. He was known for his frequent collaboration with animator Butch Hartman, with his work being nominated for four Emmy Awards.

== Early life and education ==
Guy Vernon Moon was born in Madison, Wisconsin, on February 7, 1962. Moon was raised in Fort Atkinson, where he would start his music career. Moon played piano for his school's swing choir and tuba in the marching band. He also composed cadences for the marching band. While in high school, he received the John Philip Sousa band award. He graduated from the University of Arizona School of Music. The program would occasionally perform pieces by Moon in the years following his graduation. Moon moved from Wisconsin to California in 1986.

== Career ==
In his early career in the 1980s, Moon composed the film Creepozoids (1987). He went on to begin his work in animated films, contributing to the score of The Land Before Time (1988) before composing for the animated shows The Addams Family (1992) and Johnny Bravo (1997).

Moon's background in jazz music informed his compositions, mostly music for film and animated television series. He cited Carl W. Stalling and Raymond Scott as influences for his cartoon work. He had a working relationship with animator Butch Hartman, working on his series The Fairly OddParents (2001–2017), Danny Phantom (2004–2007), T.U.F.F. Puppy (2010–2015), and Bunsen Is a Beast (2017–2018). He won a 2007 Annie Award for Outstanding Music in an Animated Television Production, three consecutive BMI Cable Awards from 2002 to 2004, and was nominated for four Primetime Emmy Awards for his work on The Fairly OddParents. Moon composed other Nickelodeon shows including ChalkZone (2002–2005), Back at the Barnyard (2007–2010), and the live action series Big Time Rush (2009–2013). He also worked on the Cartoon Network shows Cow and Chicken and its spinoff I.M. Weasel. He was also credited with composing and orchestrating the music for The Real Adventures of Jonny Quest as well as both the original and revival series of Johnny Test. He had also contributed to vocals and writing lyrics for two episodes of The Ren & Stimpy Show.

Moon also worked on feature films, including The Truman Show (1998), Fight Club (1999), American Psycho (2000), Planet of the Apes (2001), Minority Report (2002), The Day After Tomorrow (2004), War of the Worlds (2005), X-Men: The Last Stand (2006), and Evan Almighty (2007). He composed such films as The Brady Bunch Movie (1995), as well as its sequel, A Very Brady Sequel (1996). His later career was dedicated to more live action works including The Green Vail (2024) and The Artist (2025). Moon was noted for his faith and taught at the Mekane Yesus Seminary, travelling to Ethiopia in 2011, to teach students film and media techniques.

== Personal life and death ==
Moon resided in San Fernando Valley. He was married and had three children. He suffered from tinnitus in his final years after sustaining an injury to his eardrum.

On January 8, 2026, Moon was hit by a vehicle while riding a scooter in Wilmington, Los Angeles. He died of traumatic injuries at the scene, at the age of 63.

== Filmography ==
=== Film ===
Year	Film	Notes
1987	Creepozoids	
1988	Sorority Babes in the Slimeball Bowl-O-Rama	
1989	The Runnin' Kind	
1989	Deadly Weapon	
1989	The Occultist	
1990	Diving In	
1991	Reason for Living: The Jill Ireland Story	
1991	Pink Lightning	
1991	Love and Curses... and All That Jazz	
1991	Captive	
1995	The Brady Bunch Movie	
1995	Out-of-Sync	
1995	Howling: New Moon Rising	
1996	A Very Brady Sequel	
1999	Come On Get Happy: The Partridge Family Story	
2001	These Old Broads	
2001	The Way She Moves	
2003	The Electric Piper	Produced in 2000
2004	Mickey	
2004	The Jimmy Timmy Power Hour	
2006	The Jimmy Timmy Power Hour 2: When Nerds Collide	
2006	The Jimmy Timmy Power Hour 3: The Jerkinators	
2009	The Call	
2010	Forsaken	
2011	A Fairly Odd Movie: Grow Up, Timmy Turner!	
2012	Big Time Movie	
2012	A Fairly Odd Christmas	
2014	A Fairly Odd Summer	
2017	The Crash	
2024	The Thundermans Return	
2024	Ryan's World the Movie: Titan Universe Adventure	Final film

=== Television ===
Year	Series	Notes
1988–1989	Baby Boom	
1989–1990	The Famous Teddy Z	
1989–1990	Brand New Life	
1989–1990	Snoops	
1990	Elvis	
1990	Cartoon All-Stars to the Rescue	
1991–1992	Man of the People	
1992	CBS Schoolbreak Special	Episode: Different Worlds: A Story of Interracial Love
1992–1993	The Addams Family	
1992–1996	California Dreams	
1993–1995	2 Stupid Dogs	
1994–1995	The Ren & Stimpy Show	Backup vocalist and additional composer (episodes: "Blazing Entrails" and "A Scooter for Yaksmas")
1995–1996	What a Cartoon!	Episodes: "Cow and Chicken: No Smoking", "Boid 'n' Woim", "Pizza Boy: No Tip", "Bloo's Gang: Bow-Wow Buccaneers", "Tumbleweed Tex: School Daze"
1996–1997	The Real Adventures of Jonny Quest	
1996	Cave Kids	
1997	Johnny Bravo	Season 1 only
1997–1999	Cow and Chicken	
1998–2001	Oh Yeah! Cartoons	Episodes: "The Fairly OddParents" segments, "Hobart" segments, "Enchanted Adventures", "The Man with No Nose", "Terry and Chris"
1999	The Angry Beavers	Backup vocalist with Charlie Brissette, Mitch Schauer, and Shawn Patterson in the episode "The Legend of Kid Friendly"
1999	Little Witch	
1999–2000	Movie Stars	
1999–2000; 2002; 2005; 2023–2025	SpongeBob SquarePants	7 episodes (with the soundtrack "Bartmania A")
2001–2017	The Fairly OddParents	
2002–2004	ChalkZone	
2003	The Adventures of Jimmy Neutron, Boy Genius	Additional music (episodes: "The Eggpire Strikes Back", "Love Potion 976/J", "Holly Jolly Jimmy", "Operation: Rescue Jet Fusion")
2004–2007	Danny Phantom	Theme song composer and performer
2005–2008	Johnny Test	
2006–2009	Yin Yang Yo!	Theme song writer
2007–2009	Tak and the Power of Juju	
2007–2011	Back at the Barnyard	Also voice as a vocalist for the episode "A Barn Days Night"
2008–2009	Random! Cartoons	Episodes: "Sparkles and Gloom", "Super John Doe Junior", "Dr. Dee and Bit Boy"
2009–2013	Big Time Rush	with Dusty Moon
2010–2015	T.U.F.F. Puppy	
2014–2016	100 Things to Do Before High School	
2017–2018	Bunsen Is a Beast	
2018–2019	The Adventures of Rocky and Bullwinkle	
2021–2022	Johnny Test	Netflix revival series
