= Benjamin P. Ablao Jr. =

American film director

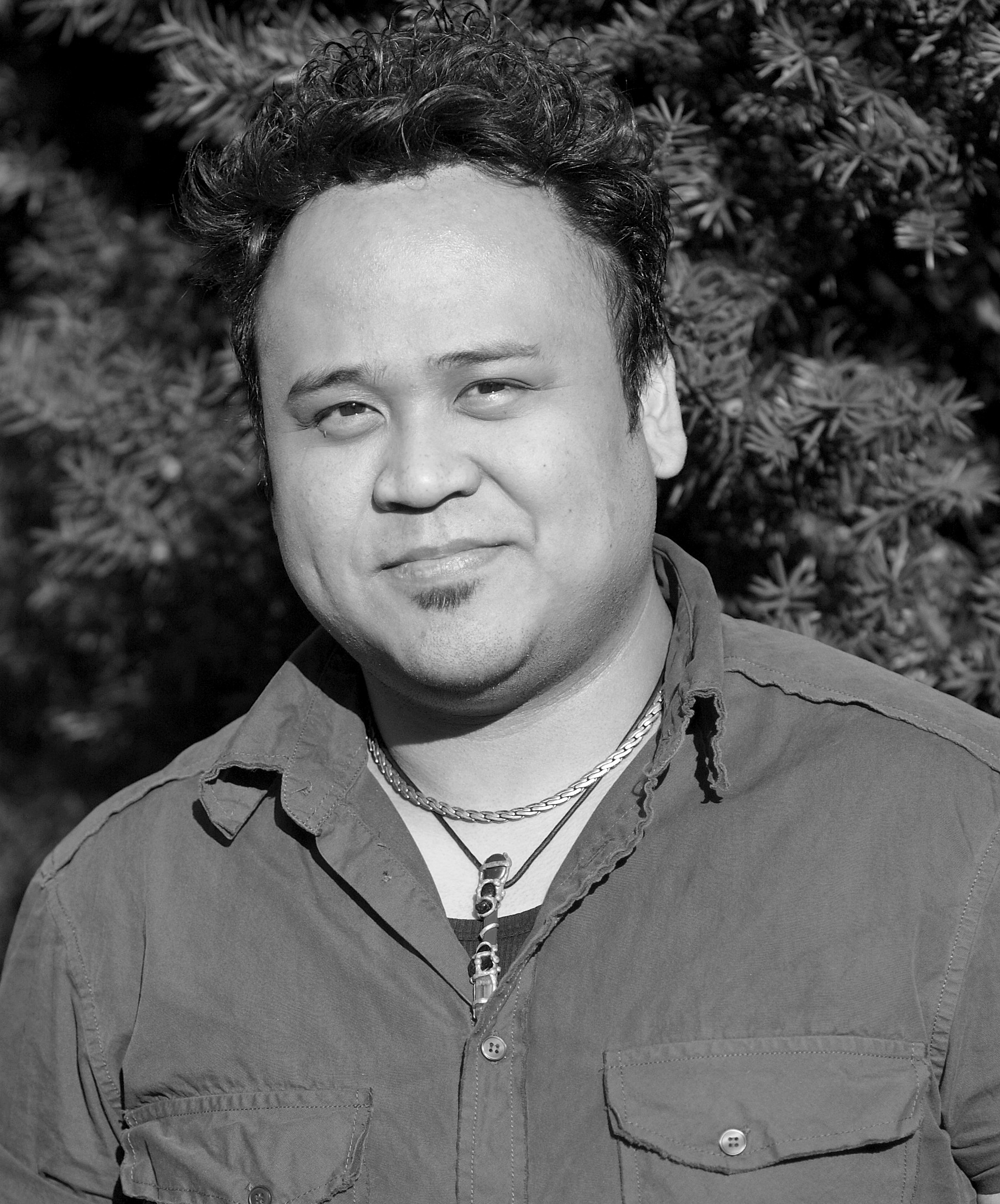
- Born: Benjamin James Perez Ablao Jr. July 27, 1974 (age 52); Wilmington, Delaware, U.S.
- Occupations: Film producer, Actor
- Years active: 2001—present
- Awards: Exemplary Filmmaking Award - "Emo Pill", "Monday Morning" - 2006 Delaware Valley Film Festival; 2nd Place Best Experimental Short - "Monday Morning" - 2006 Indie Gathering Film Festival; Best Experimental Short - "The First Date" - 2007 Indie Gathering Film Festival; 3rd Place Best Experimental Short - "Emo Pill" - 2007 Indie Gathering Film Festival
- Website: http://www.bpajr.com

Benjamin James Perez Ablao Jr. (born July 27, 1974) is an independent (indie film) filmmaker and actor from the United States. He is the founder of B.P.A. Productions Group, Inc., a registered corporation with the State of Delaware. Not limited to any one particular genre, he has produced award-winning films ranging from comedy to drama to artistic to horror.

== Biography ==
=== Early life and education ===
Benjamin P. Ablao Jr. was born in Wilmington, Delaware to Benjamin P. Ablao Sr. and Angelita P. Ablao. He is the oldest of two children, with a sister named Betsy. His parents were both of Filipino heritage, with his father being from the Philippine capital, Manila, and mother from the Philippine "summer capital", Baguio.

His parents were experienced professionals in their careers. His father was a civil engineer for a private firm until his retirement in 2007, and his mother was a Medical Technologist for the State of Delaware until her retirement in 2006. His parents were active members with a local Filipino organization, the Pilipino American Association of Delaware ("PAAD"), which was very active in the performance arts and heritage celebration. His experiences growing up in the small town of Claymont, a northern suburb of Wilmington, and his early exposure to performing in school/organization talent shows would eventually resurface again in his later life.

As a young boy, Ablao sang in school talent shows and performed in PAAD-sponsored Holiday / Talent events. His sister also performed for similar events and many times they sang duets together. He and his sister also took piano lessons at the urging of their mother.

After high school, he enrolled at the University of Delaware as an International Relations major and continued his education there until he transferred to Widener University in 1997. He obtained his Bachelor of Science degree and Certificate in Paralegal Studies in 2003.

He is currently working to obtain his Masters in Business Administration from the University of Phoenix-Philadelphia (PA) campus.

=== Journalism ===
Ablao attended Wilmington's Salesianum School and took many courses in public policy, government and business. He was a member of several student organizations including Model United Nations, stage crew and The Review, the high school's newspaper.

He also served during his junior and senior years as Acting Editor-in-Chief, Managing Editor, Art Director, and journalist for The Eye Magazine, a statewide student-run monthly magazine published by the Resource Center of the YMCA of Delaware until 1992. Because of his dedication and commitment to the magazine, the YMCA of Delaware named him a “1991 Youth Volunteer of the Year” recipient and was asked to and served on the Board of Directors for the Resource Center of the YMCA of Delaware from 1992 through 1993.

Upon graduation from high school, he attended the University of Delaware, where he served as the propraetor (alumni secretary) for the Kappa Delta Rho fraternity (AB Chapter) in 1994, and was responsible for the organization and publication of the fraternity newsletter. From 2000 through 2002, Ablao served as president of the Kappa Delta Rho Alumni Corporation (AB Chapter) and editor-in-chief of the bi-annual alumni newsletter.

=== Film beginnings and awards ===
While working in a financial services company in 2001, Ablao met director Anthony Spadaccini. In what started out initially as providing input for several film clips has grown and developed into a strong business relationship and personal friendship. Eventually Spadaccini, under the Fleet Street Films label, combined with the support from Ablao, under the B.P.A. Productions label. Fleet Street Films is a subsidiary and the independent film productions studio of B.P.A. Productions Group.

Ablao has produced several short and feature films including: "Emo Pill" (2006), “Aftermath” (2005) and “Hatred” (2006).

The short film "Monday Morning" (2005) (a tribute to the Chaplin/Keaton silent comedies) has played at numerous film festivals in the U.S. & Canada since 2005, and won 2nd place for Best Experimental Short at the 2006 Indie Gathering Film Festival. "The First Date" (2006) , the follow-up to "Monday Morning", won Best Experimental Short at the 2007 Indie Gathering Film Festival. Similarly the critically acclaimed experimental short "Emo Pill", distinguished for its beautiful & haunting imagery, has played at several festivals in the U.S. & Canada, debuting at the 2006 Newark Film Festival and winning 3rd Place for Best Experimental Short at the 2007 Indie Gathering Film Festival.

Exemplary Filmmaking awards were issued for both "Emo Pill" and "Monday Morning" at the 2006 Delaware Valley Film Festival.

Including “Emo Pill,” “Aftermath,” “Hatred,” and “Monday Morning,” Ablao has served as executive producer for a multitude of other productions: “Unstable” (2005), “The Troubled Interviewee” (2002), “Glenville: Hell’s Homecoming” (2005), “Head Case" (2007) and "Amateur Porn Star Killer 2" (2008).

Ablao's acting credits include the horror short "En Passant", all by award-winning filmmaker Johnny K. Wu, and Spadaccini's "Hatred", "The First Date", and "Head Case."

The latest feature film, "Head Case" (a horror pseudo-documentary), premiered at the 3rd annual Newark Film Festival, which drew in the largest crowd for a local independent film for the second straight year.

Ablao has made special appearances on the local & regional media circuit such as WVUD, the University of Delaware student radio and was a guest speaker for independent film production at Wilmington College in 2006.

Ablao is currently working on promoting "Head Case", as well as producing three feature films simultaneously. In addition, he is producing a music video for Chris Watson (a contestant on the 7th season of American Idol).

== See also ==
- Bothum, Peter. Indie Filmmakers Banking On A Bright Future. (Wilmington, Delaware), The News Journal, 2 April 2006, Pg. 2
- http://www.ymcade.org/
- https://web.archive.org/web/20080429204611/http://www.kdrab.com/
- http://www.kdr-ab.com/
