= The Dead Hate the Living! =

- DVD cover
- Directed by: Dave Parker
- Screenplay by: Dave Parker
- Story by: Paul J. Salamoff; Dave Parker
- Produced by: Kirk Edward Hansen
- Starring: Eric Clawson; Jamie Donahue; Brett Beardslee
- Cinematography: Thomas L. Callaway
- Edited by: Dave Parker; Harry James Picardi
- Music by: Jared DePasquale; Haunted Garage; Michael Sonye
- Production company: Full Moon Entertainment
- Distributed by: Koch Vision
- Release date: February 8, 2000
- Running time: 90 minutes
- Country: United States
- Language: English
- Budget: US$150,000

The Dead Hate the Living! is a 2000 low budget zombie film written and directed by Dave Parker and produced by Full Moon Entertainment. The film is dedicated to producer Kirk Edward Hansen, who died on December 18, 1999.

== Plot ==
The film opens with a scientist, Eibon, recording a message stating that he had successfully brought the dead back to life and that he plans to become one of them. He is then attacked by a zombie that had managed to break into his lab. About a month later a group of young filmmakers, actors Shelly and Eric, director David, and FX artists Paul and Marcus, break into an abandoned hospital, unaware that it was the same one that Eibon used for his experiments.

Their attempts to make a horror film are interrupted when David and Shelly's sister Nina arrives on set, upset that Shelly had taken her role in the film. She continues to act antagonistically to other crew members, which includes a gofer named Topaz, insisting that the filming and special effects be retooled for her. This causes a pause in filming, during which time the crew investigates the hospital, finding both Eibon's laboratory and his corpse, which is inside a strange coffin. David decides to use the corpse as a prop, which disgusts Shelly and makes her quit the film. Later during filming Eric accidentally brings Eibon back to life via the coffin, which emits a strange purple light and opens a vortex through which two zombies emerge. Eric is promptly killed by the zombies and brought back to life by Eibon. It's also revealed that Eibon became interested in bringing the dead back to life after his beloved wife Ellie died from cancer.

The zombies pick off the crew one by one, including Shelly, until only Topaz, David, and Paul are left. Topaz is captured and brought to Eibon's laboratory, as she had killed a zombie Ellie. Paul and David disguise themselves as zombies to infiltrate the lair and eliminate enemies, however Paul dies in the process. David manages to successfully free Topaz and destroy Eibon, however when they try to leave the hospital they find themselves in a different dimension inhabited by the dead.

== Cast ==
- Eric Clawson as David Poe
- Jamie Donahue as Topaz
- Brett Beardslee as Paul
- Wendy Speake as Shelly Poe
- Benjamin P. Morris as Eric
- Rick Irwin as Marcus
- David Douglas as Chas
- Matt Stephens as Dr. Eibon
- Kimberly Pullis as Nina Poe
- Andre 'Doc' Newman as Maggot
- Matthew McGrory as Gaunt (his acting debut)
- Ariana Albright as Ellie Eibon
- Mitch Persons as The Zombie

== Critical response ==
Fatally Yours offered in their review that [the film] "is straight up one of the best Full Moon Entertainment movies out there for sure", praising the director and casting. They concluded by remarking that while the film might "seem like your typical cheesy horror film it does have its memorable moments that make you happy to be able to be viewing it." Beyond Hollywood wrote that the film began with "the biggest cliche' of movie cliche's" in that the protagonists were themselves filmmakers filming a horror movie scene as part of the horror movie itself. They made note of the low budget and that the film was no exception to films of this genre not being known for presenting great acting, underscoring that the first 20 minutes were "excruciatingly bad", though granting that the acting did get better, leading the reviewer to suppose that the project was possibly shot in the same order as scripted, allowing the actors to become more comfortable with their characters as the film progressed. eFilmCritic found the film to be "easily one of the absolute worst films to ever smudge a rental store shelf", opining that the film's script was cliche' and unoriginal, the pacing would "cause even snails to squirm with impatience", and concluding the review by writing the film was "horribly directed, horribly shot, and just plain horribly executed." Mike Bracken of IGN wrote, "Ultimately, this is one of the better zombie flicks to come along in awhile". Glenn Kay wrote that the film is enthusiastic, but "most viewers will agree that the living hate The Dead Hate the Living!"
