= Michelle Bauer =

American actress (born 1958)

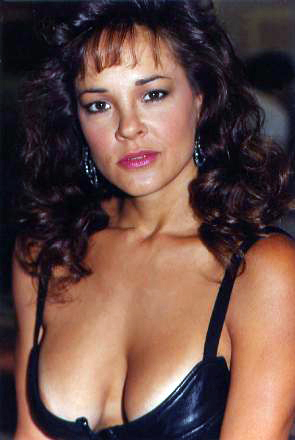
- Bauer at GlamourCon
- Born: October 1, 1958 (age 68); Montebello, California, U.S.
- Other names: Kim Bittner; Michelle McClellan; Pia Snow
- Occupations: Actress; model
- Years active: 1981–present
- Height: 5 ft 7 in (170 cm)
- Children: 1

Michelle Bauer (born October 1, 1958), also credited as Pia Snow, Kim Bittner, and Michelle McClellan, is an American actress, model, and B movie scream queen.

== Early life ==
Michelle Bauer was born on October 1, 1958, in Montebello and grew up in Simi Valley, California. Her mother was a preschool teacher and her father was a condominium manager. After her parents' divorce, she stayed with her mother.

She was not born Bauer; it is her married name.

== Career ==
Bauer was Penthouse magazine's "Pet of the Month" for July 1981 and also appeared in many other adult magazines during the early to mid-1980s, under a number of different names.

Bauer starred in the pornographic film Café Flesh (1982) under the name of Pia Snow. She states that she was happy to appear in the film and on the covers of other films with an X rating, but insisted on a body double for the sex scenes. Bauer appeared in several other pornographic titles under her Pia Snow moniker, including Bad Girls, Nightdreams (both 1981), and others.

Bauer's Penthouse centerfold appearance led to acting for the Playboy Channel and a film try-out for director Fred Olen Ray. Ray liked her audition, and offered her the part if she would be willing to dye her hair black. Her first B movie was The Tomb (1986), it would be the first of many. Along with Linnea Quigley and Brinke Stevens, Bauer became one of the most prominent B movie scream queens in the late 1980s. In addition to multiple films for Ray, she has worked with cult directors David DeCoteau, Jesús Franco and Zalman King and shared the screen with genre stars such as Sybil Danning, Monique Gabrielle, Julie Strain, Lina Romay, George Kennedy, David Carradine, Gunnar Hansen, Paul Naschy and Erik Estrada.

Her career is one of the main subjects of the 2011 documentary Screaming in High Heels: The Rise and Fall of the Scream Queen Era by director Jason Paul Collum. She returned for the 2020 follow-up short Screaming in High Heels: The Reunion which again reunited her with Quigley and Stevens.

== Personal life ==
Bauer retained her married name as a screen name. After she and her husband divorced, he filed a lawsuit requesting she not use it for her films. She tried appearing as Michelle McClellan, using the name of her second husband, in Hollywood Chainsaw Hookers (1988), but the press resisted, so she returned to Bauer, which the first husband eventually accepted. The McClellans have a daughter.

== Selected filmography ==
- 1981 Bad Girls as Angie (credited as Pia Snow)
- 1981 Nightdreams as Chained Girl (uncredited)
- 1982 Café Flesh as Lana (credited as Pia Snow)
- 1982 Homework as Dream Groupie (uncredited)
- 1984 Special Request as Jan (credited as Kim Bittner)
- 1985 Terror on Tape as Third Customer
- 1985 Tied & Tickled as Janet (credited as Pia Snow)
- 1985 Tomboy as Woman In Corvette (uncredited)
- 1985 Cavegirl as Locker Room Student
- 1986 Beverly Hills Girls as Michelle Scott
- 1986 Reform School Girls as Shower Girl (uncredited)
- 1986 The Tomb as Nefratis
- 1987 Lust for Freedom as Jackie
- 1987 Night of the Living Babes as Sue (credited as Michelle McClellan)
- 1988 Hollywood Chainsaw Hookers as Mercedes (credited as Michelle McLellan)
- 1988 Demonwarp as Betsy
- 1988 Nightmare Sisters as Mickey (credited as Michelle McClellan)
- 1988 Death Row Diner as Julia Wilcox-Weston
- 1988 Lady Avenger as Annalee (credited as Michelle McClellan)
- 1988 Sorority Babes in the Slimeball Bowl-O-Rama as Lisa (credited as Michelle McClellan)
- 1989 Terror Night as Jo
- 1989 Beverly Hills Vamp as Kristina
- 1989 Dr. Alien as Coed #1
- 1989 Assault of the Party Nerds as Muffin (credited as Michelle McClellan)
- 1989 The Phantom Empire as Cave Bunny
- 1989 The Jigsaw Murders as Cindy Jakulski
- 1991 Virgin High as Miss Bush
- 1991 Puppet Master III: Toulon's Revenge as Lili
- 1991 Camp Fear as Dorm Girl
- 1992 Evil Toons as Mrs. Burt
- 1993 Naked Instinct as Michelle
- 1994 Dinosaur Island as June
- 1995 Red Lips as Lisa
- 1995 Bikini Drive-In as Dyanne Lynn
- 1995 Vampire Vixens from Venus as Shampay
- 1995 Assault of the Party Nerds Part 2: Heavy Petting Detective as Muffin
- 1995 Attack of the 60 Foot Centerfold as Dr. Joyce Mann
- 1995 Witch Academy as Tara
- 1998 Mari-Cookie and the Killer Tarantula in 8 Legs to Love You as Sheriff Marga
- 1998 Lust for Frankenstein as Goddess / The Creature
- 2000 Blood and Honor as Maude Stuart
- 2004 Tomb of the Werewolf as Elizabeth Bathory
- 2005 The Naked Monster as Second Mom
- 2006 The Bikini Escort Company as Miss Howell
- 2008 Gingerdead Man 2: Passion of the Crust as Polly Bunderhoof
- 2008 Voodoo Dollz as Miss Anton
- 2010 Megaconda as Anna Carson
- 2011 1313: Wicked Stepbrother as Minvera
- 2011 1313: Actor Slash Model as Suzy
- 2012 1313: Cougar Cult as Victoria
- 2012 1313: Bermuda Triangle as Echo
- 2013 The Trouble With Barry as Michelle
- 2014 3 Scream Queens as Sylvia
- 2022 Mark of the Devil 777: The Moralist, Part 2 as Miss Mann
- 2022 Sorority Babes in the Slimeball Bowl-O-Rama 2 as Lisa
- 2024 Monster Mash as Browning
- 2024 Return of the Dark House of Mystery as Emma Lou
- 2025 Mockbuster as herself
