= The Tomb (1986 film) =

- VHS cover
- Directed by: Fred Olen Ray
- Written by: Kenneth J. Hall; T.L. Lankford
- Produced by: Fred Olen Ray; Ronnie Hadar; Paul Hertzberg; Richard Kaye
- Starring: Cameron Mitchell; John Carradine; Sybil Danning
- Cinematography: Paul Elliott
- Edited by: Miriam L. Preissel
- Music by: Drew Neumann
- Production company: Trans World Entertainment
- Distributed by: Trans World Entertainment
- Release date: October 2, 1986
- Running time: 84 minutes
- Country: United States
- Language: English

The Tomb is a 1986 American supernatural horror film directed by Fred Olen Ray and starring Michelle Bauer, Richard Alan Hench, David Pearson and Susan Stokey. Despite being respectively given first and second billing, Cameron Mitchell only has a supporting role, and John Carradine features in single scene. Sybil Danning also only appears in the prologue, despite being prominently shown on the poster. The plot concerns an ancient Egyptian vampire who kills those in possession of artifacts stolen from her and taken to the United States by grave robbers.

== Plot synopsis ==
Dr. Howard Phillips robs tombs for a living, selling artifacts he steals from an unmarked tomb in Egypt. His desecration of a tomb displeases an immortal woman, who is out for revenge for the theft.

== Cast ==
- Cameron Mitchell as Dr. Howard Phillips
- John Carradine as Mr. Andoheb
- Sybil Danning as Jade
- Michelle Bauer as Nefratis
- David Pearson as John Banning
- George Hoth as Dr. Stewart
- Stu Weltman as Detective Sullivan
- Frank McDonald as Officer Ullman
- Victor von Wright as Detective
- Jack Frankel as Dr. Manners
- Craig Hamann as Tyler
- Kitten Natividad as Stripper
- Michael Sonye as The Waiter

== Production ==
=== Development ===
The film's basic idea came to Fred Olen Ray when he learned from an insider at New World Pictures that the company was considering an adaptation of F. Paul Wilson's 1984 novel The Tomb. The director reasoned that if he managed to get a homonymous film into production before they made their own, his competitors might give him an easy payday to rename it and keep the title for themselves (New World ultimately passed on the adaptation). Although a rumor asserts that The Tomb was loosely based on Bram Stoker's 1903 novel The Jewel of Seven Stars, this is not mentioned on the film's poster, nor in the credits or in Ray's 1991 book where its genesis is discussed. Several characters, however, bear names that appear in classic installments of Universal Pictures' Mummy franchise.

=== Preliminary filming ===
Towards the end of 1984, a friend of Ray's opened to him about a problem. He had rented some set panels for a student film he was making at Columbia University, but the school had granted him restrictive time slots at their in-house film studio. The set, an Indiana Jones-inspired tomb, had been built by production designer Alan Jones and carpenters from Cinebar on behalf of advertising agency Dancer Fitzgerald Sample. It had been commissioned for a pair of lavish Wrangler Jeans TV commercials, together budgeted at $1 million.

Ray realized the production value he could get out of it, and offered his friend to rent a studio for two full days, on the condition that he could use the set during both nights to make a sizzle reel for a film of his own. The director quickly commissioned two sections of the screenplay, both taking place inside the tomb and bookending the central story arc. He then crammed the filming of their combined twenty to thirty pages into those two nights. Ray showed the resulting footage to producer Richard Kaye, who made a successful pitch to Trans World Entertainment for the complete film. The Tomb was Ray's first project for Trans World, who had previously bought select international distribution rights to his film Biohazard from 21st Century Films.

=== Casting ===
The film marked Michelle Bauer's first lead role, and her first work with Fred Olen Ray, to whom she was introduced by a mutual acquaintance, producer Paul Hertzberg. She was chosen over one of Ray's established stars, who would have had to cover her blonde hair with a wig for the role. It was the first of several films from the director in which John Carradine appears, although Ray had worked with Carradine in a more minor capacity on Ken Wiederhorn's Shock Waves. Ray tried to get Martin Landau to play Dr. Phillips, but the latter demanded $10,000 for his appearance. When Cameron Mitchell, whose phone number had recently been passed onto him by a journalist, accepted to do it for $2,000, the producers deemed that he represented similar marquee value and cast him instead. The role of Dr. Manners marked the feature debut of former scientist and California State University at Bakersfield president Jack Frankel, who had left his function one year prior to embrace acting after "it struck [him] that [he] didn't want to do this for the rest of [his] life".

=== Principal photography ===
Trans World Entertainment put up a modest $185,000 for Ray to shoot the rest of The Tomb. The second sessions spanned thirteen days and took place in April 1985. The land around Iverson Ranch, California, stood in for the Egyptian desert.

=== Post-production ===
While Ray found Trans World to be a step up from 21st Century regarding business dealings, it was also his first experience with a vertical production structure. Ray's cut featured more comedic elements, including seven musical numbers spread throughout the film, as well as nudity and violence. His bosses had most of them edited out from their final cut to make it closer to a classic adventure film. Although Trans World was initially lukewarm about Ray's approach, the film's commercial success prompted them to reconnect one year later, and offer him a two-picture deal, consisting of Commando Squad and a sequel to Creature (which became Deep Space).

== Release ==
The Tomb was released by Trans World in the U.S. on October 2, 1986. It was apparently delayed from an earlier date of September 22, for which some advertising material was circulated. The film was a commercial success, moving between 29,000 and 40,000 tapes depending on recollections, a rare number at the time for a direct-to-video film. According to Ray, the tape quickly received a Gold certification from one of the industry's sanctioning bodies. The domestic release was preceded by a U.K. bow in the third week of May 1986 by Frontier, a short-lived label of Guild Home Video.

== Reception ==
The Tomb received mixed-to-negative reviews. Ballantine Books' Video Movie Guide called it a "[t]ypical high-energy and low-budget Fred Olen Ray production, with the veteran stars on hand for B-movie marquee value, while a largely unknown young cast handles the strenuous mayhem." In his syndicated column, British reviewer John Brooker criticized the bait-and-switch tactic of casting actors in shorter roles than their billing suggested, although he was moderately positive about the overall film, saying there was "[n]othing new here, but the special effects are passable and horror fans will not find it too hard to take".

Joe Kane of the New York Daily News disagreed, and called the film "memorably bad". John Stanley, author of the Creature Features series of compendiums, panned it too: he complained that The Tomb failed to immerse in its ancient culture, due to "bad" direction and dialogue, as well as "really bad" acting laden with "pointless cameos". British reference book Elliot's Guide to Home Entertainment summed it up as a "campy horror yarn of three parts tedium and one part chills".
