= Head Cases: Serial Killers in the Delaware Valley =

- Directed by: Anthony Spadaccini
- Starring: Paul McCloskey; Brinke Stevens
- Release date: September 28, 2013
- Running time: 110 minutes
- Country: United States
- Language: English

Head Cases: Serial Killers in the Delaware Valley is a 2013 horror film from director Anthony Spadaccini. The film continues the story told in Head Case.

== Plot ==
Serial killer Wayne Montgomery committed 41 murders between 1979 and 2007, leaving behind an extensive library of his life's work. Now, a new generation carries on Wayne's legacy in a terrifying world where rules do not apply. Take a trip through the mind of one of history's most prolific serial killers - and his devoted followers who are out for blood.

== Cast ==
- Paul McCloskey as Wayne Montgomery
- Brinke Stevens as Julie Quinn
- Mark Cray as John Craven
- Michael Manfredo Jr. as Kyle Stratten
- Barbara Lessin as Andrea Montgomery
- Mark Marcarian as Charles Craven
- Jeremy Bishop as Luke Crossen
- Duane Noch as Henry Crossen (credited as Nate Edwards)
- Bill Ushler as Detective Michael Hanlon
- Lisa Panzer as Marti Dobson
- Roberto Lombardi as Detective Joe Moretti
- Jerry Ross as Ray Olsen
- Devin Kates as Seth Hayden
- Joey Garrison as Jared
- David M. Sitbon as Grey Mortimer
- Shawn Shillingford as Christopher Hagans
- Michael J. Panichelli Jr. as Detective John Haynes
- Bruce DeSantis as Todd Montgomery
- Emily Spiegel as Monica Montgomery
- James Schaeffer as Detective David Shaw
- Florence Coia as Rebecca Collins
- Tony J. Spadaccini as Detective Bill Price
- Damien Colletti as Charles David "Charlie" Craven
- Jay Cusack as Jeffrey
- Michael Agnew as Joseph Barker
- John Coia as Alan Montgomery
- Kati Jordan as Holly Craven
- Jennifer Griffin-Munson as Marie Craven
- Sabrina Manfredo as Allison Stratten
- Todd Kaylor as Detective Paul Brewer
- Taylor Sampere as Austin
- Derek Rushlow as Mike
- Eric Moyer as Lewis
- Brendon Bertolini as Fortunato
- Brandon Macker as Daniel Azzurri
- Glynis Sampere as Debbie
- Kyle Field as Pete, Reaction Video #1
- Kelly Tull as Melissa, Reaction Video #2
- Nikki Krumm as Sarah, Reaction Video #2
- Robbie Shanders as Brian, Reaction Video #3
- Jack Walker as Chip, Reaction Video #4
- Al Holmes as Gary, Reaction Video #5
- Ruth Weisberg as The Narrator
