= Nightmare Sisters =

1988 American Horror Comedy Film

- Directed by: David DeCoteau
- Written by: Kenneth J. Hall
- Produced by: David DeCoteau
- Starring: Linnea Quigley; Brinke Stevens; Michelle Bauer
- Release date: June 15, 1988
- Running time: 83 min
- Country: United States
- Language: English

Nightmare Sisters (also released as Sorority Succubus Sisters) is a 1988 direct-to-video, low-budget, horror comedy. It is notable as one of only two films in which 1980s scream queens Linnea Quigley, Brinke Stevens, and Michelle Bauer appear together, excluding later reunion films such as 1313:Cougar Cult.

== Plot ==
Buck-toothed Melody, bespectacled Marci, and chubby Mickey are socially awkward sorority sisters. Desperate for some fun, they invite a trio of equally nerdy fraternity pledges over for a party. The party fizzles and the guys are on the verge of leaving when the girls try to liven things up by holding a séance. The crystal ball they use at the séance is cursed and causes the girls to become possessed by a succubus.

The suddenly sexy girls share some pie and a bath and then set out to seduce and murder their guests. The girls take on new personas to help them trap their prey. Mickey becomes a bikini-clad jungle girl, Marci transforms herself into a pigtail-sporting naughty girl, and Melody changes into a wild rock chick. The boys fight temptation and try to find help for the girls. The situation gets more complicated when the boys’ loutish fraternity brothers show up looking to score.

== Cast ==
- Linnea Quigley as Melody
- Brinke Stevens as Marci
- Michelle Bauer as Mickey
- Richard Gabai as Kevin, Melody's Date
- William Dristas as Duane, Marci's Date
- Marcus Vaughter as Freddy, Mickey's Date
- Timothy Kauffman as Phil, An Obnoxious Frat Guy
- Matthew Phelps as J.J., An Obnoxious Frat Guy
- C. Jay Cox as Bud, An Obnoxious Frat Guy
- Michael Sonye as Omar
- Jim Culver as The Exorcist

== Music ==
Music for the film was performed by the Los Angeles punk/metal band Haunted Garage, whose frontman Dukey Flyswatter also appears in the film as Omar. Songs include "Sorority Sister Succubus" and "Brain in a Jar". A later recording of "Brain in a Jar" appeared on the band's 1991 CD Possession Park.

Linnea Quigley also sings “Santa Monica Blvd. Boys,” a song she performed with her band The Skirts.

== History ==
Nightmare Sisters was filmed over four days in September 1987 for about $40,000 using left-over film, cast, and crew from the just completed Sorority Babes in the Slimeball Bowl-O-Rama.

The film was shot in the producer's rented home. Set decoration largely consisted of different colored lighting and covering the walls with posters. (One of the posters is for Creepozoids, another David DeCoteau film starring Linnea Quigley.) The actresses did their own make-up and provided their own costumes.

The film was intended for the video rental market and possibly showings on late night cable television. Nightmare Sisters disappeared from sight shortly after being released on June 15, 1988 by Trans World Entertainment. The company distributing the film abruptly went out of business with the result that less than 2,000 copies of the tape were ever distributed. The film became an instant obscurity.

Over the next decade, the popularity of the three actresses, word of mouth about the famous bathtub scene, and the scarcity of the film caused it to develop a cult reputation.

A segment from Nightmare Sisters featuring Linnea Quigley singing was included in Linnea Quigley’s Horror Workout (1990). Footage also appeared in Scream Queen Hot Tub Party (1991) and was discussed in the documentary Screaming in High Heels: The Rise & Fall of the Scream Queen Era (2011).

In the early 1990s, a censored version of Nightmare Sisters aired on USA Up All Night on USA Network. The famous scene in which the girls share a bath was excised and replaced with newly shot footage of the actresses in lingerie, jumping on a bed, and bouncing balloons.

== DVD release ==
Nightmare Sisters was released on DVD in 2003 with commentary tracks from the cast and director.
