= Wolf Muser =

German actor (1950–2022)

- Born: 23 October 1950; Esslingen, Baden-Württemberg, West Germany
- Died: 30 March 2022 (aged 71)
- Occupation: Actor
- Years active: 1975–2022

Wolf Muser (23 October 1950 – 30 March 2022) was a German actor who played the role of Marcello Armonti on the NBC soap opera Santa Barbara in 1985.

Prior to joining the cast of Santa Barbara, he also appeared as Kurt Voightlander on the CBS drama Capitol in 1983. In 2015, he played a septuagenarian Adolf Hitler in The Man in the High Castle, giving all the character's dialogue in German.

Muser died on 30 March 2022, at the age of 71.

== Filmography (selection) ==
- 1975: Frozen Scream
- 1982: Barbarosa
- 1982: Yes, Giorgio
- 1982: Kiss Me Goodbye
- 1983: To Be or Not to Be
- 1985: Santa Barbara (TV series)
- 1990: Caged in Paradiso
- 1995: Final Equinox
- 1999: One Man's Hero
- 2002: Alias (TV series, 5 episodes)
- 2015–2016: The Man in the High Castle (TV series)
- 2016: Grimm (TV series)
- 2017: Adam Ruins Everything

== Video games ==
Muser voiced Dr. Klingmann in The Beast Within: A Gabriel Knight Mystery.
