= Frozen Scream =

1980 American horror film by Frank Roach

- Promotional poster
- Directed by: Frank Roach
- Screenplay by: Doug Ferrin; Celeste Hammond; Michael Sonye
- Story by: Renee Harmon; Doug Ferrin
- Produced by: Renee Harmon
- Starring: Renee Harmon; Lynne Kocol; Wolf Muser
- Cinematography: Roberto A. Quezada
- Edited by: Matthew Muller
- Music by: H. Kingsley Thurber
- Release date: 1983
- Running time: 85 minutes
- Country: United States
- Language: English
- Budget: $35,000

Frozen Scream is a 1981 American horror film directed by Frank Roach, produced by Renee Harmon, and starring Harmon, Lynne Kocol, and Thomas McGowan. Harmon also co-wrote the story with Doug Ferrin. Its plot follows two scientists whose experiments to unlock the secrets of immortality instead result in the creation of black-robed zombies that must be preserved at very low temperatures to continue functioning.

Principal photography of Frozen Scream began in L.A. in 1975, and lasted approximately 28 days. An independent project, the film was shelved until around 1981, when post-production and shooting began in Salt Lake City. Though it did not receive a theatrical release, it was eventually released on the home video market in 1983. It achieved some notoriety for its release in the UK, where it was included on the BBFC's "video nasty" list.

== Plot ==
Academic scientists Lil Stanhope and Sven Johnsson are researching the secrets of immortality. Their project involves turning their subjects into zombies and storing them in walk-in freezers. Their collaborator, Tom Girard, refuses further participation and is killed in his house by men in hooded robes who inject him with a serum. Ann, Tom's wife, arrives before the intruders can carry away his body.

Ann is hospitalized following what Lil calls "the incident in the hallway." She attempts to convince Ann that most of it was all in her head, although Ann insists she was drugged by the intruders and left unconscious. Lil says that the police found Tom's body, but there was no evidence of hooded men or hypodermic needles.

Detective Kevin McGuire is assigned to the case, which he believes is connected to the disappearance of medical students Kirk Richard and Bob Russell. Kevin wants to interview Ann—sometime in the past, she had dumped him and married Tom the following day—but Lil prevents it. Sven suggests discharging Ann and appointing Cathrin as her home nurse. Cathrin is a zombie. Tom had told Ann of the immortality project, and they had attended a ceremony on a beach on Halloween. Tom left to confess to Father O'Brien while Ann watched the students chanting "love and immortality" around a bonfire.

At their lab, Lil tells Sven that they are "interfering with nature" and that "the beings we create are not human beings." Sven assures her that they will soon unlock the secrets of immortality. Meanwhile, Kevin tells Ann of his suspicions about Sven and Lil. Ann agrees to report back on what she finds.

Kevin and Ann interview Father O'Brien. He tells them that Tom had said Sven was using curare on rats, then reviving them and keeping them at low temperatures to retard their aging process. But after being revived, Tom said, the rats acted as if they were "almost soulless." Shortly thereafter, a zombie strangles O'Brien.

Ann receives a phone call from Tom, who reports feeling cold and numb. The call ends abruptly when intruders burst into Ann's house. She calls Kevin for help and rushes to Cathrin's room. But Cathrin is not there. Instead, a zombie grabs Ann and threatens to kill her and Tom if she continues to cooperate with Kevin. Cathrin returns and denies that anyone was in the house. Not believing her, Kevin takes Ann home, where they sleep together. Kevin declares his love for her; she says nothing about her feelings toward him.

Ann searches Lil's office and discovers photos of the missing med students. She tells Kevin she will search Sven's home lab during his Halloween party. During the party, Cathrin overheats and drops dead.

The party continues. Ann sees Tom staring blankly from the window of an old house. She calls Kevin. She finds a freezer inside the house containing Tom and the missing students, both zombies—the zombies attack. Kevin kills one but is knocked over by a car and taken to the hospital. The second zombie chases Ann. Just as he is about to kill Ann, Lil appears and tells him that he has been out of the freezer too long. He immediately dies.

Ann is taken to Sven's lab, where he intends to zombify her, but Lil kills him. Lil asks Ann to take Sven's place on the immortality project. As a ruse, Ann agrees but then destroys the lab. An angry Lil decides to inject Ann with the zombie serum. O'Brien, himself a zombie, arrives.

Ann, Lil, and O'Brien visit Kevin in the hospital. Ann, now a zombie, promises to love Kevin forever. But her eternal love has a price, which Kevin pays as Lil plunges a hypodermic zombie serum into his eye.

== Cast ==
- Renee Harmon as Dr. Lil Stanhope
- Lynne Yeaman (billed as Lynne Kocol) as Ann Girard
- Thomas McGowan (billed as Thomas Gowen) as Det. Sgt. Kevin McGuire
- Wolf Muser as Dr. Tom Girard
- Bob Rochelle as Kirk Richard
- Lee James as Dr. Sven Johnsson
- Sunny Bartholomew as Cathrin
- Wayne Liebman as Fr. O'Brien
- Bill Oliver as Bob Russell

== Production ==
Frozen Scream is the first of two films made by the independent Ciara Productions, followed by Hell Riders (1984), a biker movie set in a ghost town. Frozen Scream was written and produced by Renee Harmon, who also stars in the film. Harmon, a native of Germany who immigrated to the USA and settled in California, was working as an acting coach at Moorpark College at the time of making the film, and hired several of her students to appear in the project.

Principal photography took place in 1975 in L.A.. According to Art Piatt, the production designer on the film, the shoot lasted approximately 28 days, with a budget of around $35,000. Though Frank Roach is credited as director, Harmon stated in a 2006 interview that Roach served as a cameraman, but that she handled directorial duties: "I thought that if I wrote and directed and produced and starred, it would be too much, so I gave the credit away. Frank Roach was a cameraman, but I decided it would be better to have another director on the film. I didn't want to be credited as director, for business reasons. I directed the film." Sound supervisor James Bryan, who later worked professionally with Harmon on other projects, disputed her claim that she fully took on direction, stating:

As a producer, Renee kept a very effective, tight control over her productions, planning and arranging for locations and cast. During actual production, she was fully involved with her part as an actress and with other cast members, who were usually her students. Renee spent a lot of time working with the cast, going over and over their performances in the days prior to actual production, so in that sense, she was directing and had shaped the actors and their work down to the smallest degree. When we were in production and on set, Renee never stopped as producer and worked behind the scenes to keep things on track, yet she didn't have much to say about the director's job beyond supporting his authority and demanding the same from everyone else. When others came to her with questions beyond the work done in her previous directing sessions, she would direct them to consult the director for answers. Renee was never one to usurp the director's authority and never allowed anyone on the set to do it either. She was always working to support me, and I worked to support her.

Additional post-production filming occurred in Salt Lake City around 1980–1981, approximately six years after the original shoot had completed.

Some footage from Frozen Scream was reused in Run Coyote Run (1987), which was also produced by, written by, and starred Harmon. The film is a crime thriller about a psychic who is trying to find her dead sister's killers.

== Release ==
=== Home media ===
Though originally filmed in 1975, "Frozen Scream" was not screened for distributors until "sometime around 1980" and did not receive a theatrical release. Its initial commercial release was on VHS in the UK in 1983 by Home Video Productions. In 1985, it was released for the first time in the US on a double-feature VHS tape with The Executioner Part II (1984).

Vinegar Syndrome released the film in a Blu-ray and DVD combination pack in a double feature with The Executioner Part II on September 29, 2015. Vinegar Syndrome also released a standalone DVD edition (also paired with The Executioner Part II) as part of their "Drive-In Collection" series.

=== Censorship ===
British film scholar Julian Petley lists the film as one of the 69 movies which were on the video nasties list "at one time or another." But it was not one of the 39 films prosecuted under the Obscene Publications Act 1959, which had been amended in 1983 to include films. According to British critic Neil Christopher, the film "officially (...) remains uncertified and unavailable" in the UK.

As Fred Beldin at AllMovie writes, Frozen Scream was "withdrawn from prosecution perhaps because the bluenoses were too confused by the film's constant flashbacks, dream sequences, and extraneous narration to focus on a few gratuitous axe murders and eye-gougings."

=== Critical response ===
Critics had little good to say about Frozen Scream. Its poor production values and voice-over narration were common themes, though. In The Zombie Movie Encyclopedia, academic Peter Dendle calls the film a "dismal and homely backyard effort" with "robotic acting, abrupt transitions, and annoying Wonder Years-like voice-over narration." He also notes that "The zombies wear black hooded cloaks that associate them with a certain pre-Christian immortality cult and cheesy moustaches that associate them with the '70s."

Glenn Kay describes the movie as a "totally nonsensical" and "forgettable little oddity" that "may supply a few laughs to bad-movie fans." He says that the "inappropriate narration (...) would be more suited to an infomercial" and that "Every element is truly amateurish, from the wooden acting to the lousy photography to the terrible score and the hilariously bad band during a party scene."

Likewise, British critic Jamie Russell notes that Frozen Scream features "Hooded, frozen zombies [who] run amok in this cheesy 1970s outing." He points out that the "voiceover unhelpfully drown[s] out other characters' dialogue as they speak!" and concludes that the film is "Badly made, incompetently plotted; it's pretty dire."

According to David Elroy Goldweber, "Apparently, all the sound was dubbed after filming, but some dialogue made no sense, so an extra voice-over (...) was added to clarify things. Yet no original dialogue was cut, so the second dialogue simply overlaps the first." Goldweber finds the film to be a "desperate mishmash of anything the filmmakers thought might entertain the audience."

In his book Nightmare USA: The Untold Story of the Exploitation Independents (2007), Stephen Thrower wrote: "One can feel a powerful sense of alienation and disorientation from the frankly insane Frozen Scream that rivals anything achieved by more self-conscious means."

Beldin, an AllMovie reviewer, calls the film an "unintentionally surreal sci-fi horror yarn," and adds that "there's no doubt that Frozen Scream is a highly bizarre experience psychotronic devotees should enjoy enduring."

Rifftrax riffed the movie during its 2021 season.

== Sources ==
- Budnick, Daniel R. (2017). 80's Action Movies on the Cheap: 284 Low Budget, High Impact Pictures. Jefferson, North Carolina: McFarland. ISBN 978-0-786-49741-6.
- Dendle, Peter (2001). The Zombie Movie Encyclopedia. Jefferson, North Carolina: McFarland. pp. 69–70. ISBN 978-0-7864-9288-6.
- Goldweber, David Elroy (2016). Claws & Saucers: Science Fiction, Horror and Fantasy Film 1902-1982: A Complete Guide. Morrisville, North Carolina: Lulu Press Inc. ISBN 978-1-312-28803-4.
- Kay, Glenn (2012). Zombie Movies: The Ultimate Guide. Chicago, Illinois: Chicago Review Press. ISBN 978-1-556-52770-8.
- McKenna, Mark (2020). Nasty Business: The Marketing and Distribution of the Video Nasties. Edinburgh, Scotland: Edinburgh University Press. ISBN 978-1-474-45110-9.
- Petley, Julian (2011). Film and Video Censorship in Modern Britain. Edinburgh, Scotland: Edinburgh University Press Ltd. ISBN 978-0-748-62539-0.
- Russell, Jamie (2014). Book of the Dead: The Complete History of Zombie Cibena. London, England: Titan Books. ISBN 978-1-78116-925-4.
- Thrower, Stephen (2007). Nightmare USA: The Untold Story of the Exploitation Independents. London, England: FAB Press. ISBN 978-1-903-25469-1.
