= The Last Thanksgiving =

2020 comedy horror film

- Directed by: Erick Lorinc
- Written by: Erick Lorinc
- Produced by: Annissa Omran
- Starring: Samantha Ferrand; Matthew McClure; Tristan Petashnick; Branden Holzer; Robert Richards Jr. Linnea Quigley
- Cinematography: Nicholas Punales
- Edited by: Erick Lorinc
- Music by: Noah Schatzline
- Production company: Peak Jerry Productions
- Distributed by: Scream Team Releasing
- Release date: October 2020 (Salem Horror Fest)
- Running time: 73 minutes
- Country: United States
- Language: English
- Budget: $10,000

The Last Thanksgiving is a 2020 comedy horror film written and directed by Erick Lorinc. The film stars Samantha Ferrand as a waitress who works at a restaurant that is terrorized by cannibalistic pilgrims. The ensemble cast includes Madelin Marchant, Branden Holzer, Tristan Petashnick and Matthew McClure with a cameo by scream queen Linnea Quigley.

== Plot ==
A restaurant, open for Thanksgiving, is attacked by cannibalistic pilgrims. When the dining staff fight back, carnage ensues.

== Cast ==
- Samantha Ferrand as Lisa-Marie Taft
- Matthew McClure as Kurt Brimston
- Tristan Petashnick as Cordelia Brimston
- Branden Holzer as Eddie
- Robert Richards Jr. as Tyler
- Madelin Marchant as Ms. Perez
- Laura Finley as Maggie Brimston
- Michael Vitovich as Trip Brimston
- Bobby Eddy as Buddy
- Linnea Quigley as Paulette
- Tametria Harris as Mrs. Kim
- Francisco D Gonzalez as Mr. Pearl Sr.
- Alex Michell as Mouthless
- Gaby Spampinato as Trudie
- Nicholas Punales as Mr. Pearl
- Beth McClary as Mrs. Taft
- Mitch Collins as Mr. Taft

== Production ==
The cast and crew were mainly undergrad students of the University of Miami and Miami locals.

Exteriors and a short film were filmed in November 2017 in Chattanooga, Tennessee before Principal Photography began.

Principal Photography took place on weekends from March to May 2018 in Miramar, Florida, Hollywood, Florida at Derry's Family Restaurant, and Miami, Florida.

== Release ==
The film premiered online during the COVID-19 pandemic at the Pasadena Horror Film Festival, American Horror Film Festival, and Salem Horror Fest.

Scream Team Releasing released the film on Blu-ray and VHS in November 2020.
