= Sorority Babes in the Slimeball Bowl-O-Rama =

1988 film by David DeCoteau

- Theatrical poster
- Directed by: David DeCoteau
- Written by: Sergei Hasenecz
- Produced by: John Schouweiler
- Starring: Linnea Quigley; Michelle Bauer; Andras Jones; Hal Havins; Robin Rochelle
- Cinematography: Stephen A. Blake; Scott Ressler
- Edited by: Thomas Meshelski; Barry Zetlin
- Music by: Guy Moon
- Distributed by: Urban Classics
- Release date: January 29, 1988
- Running time: 80 minutes
- Country: United States
- Language: English
- Budget: est. $90,000

Sorority Babes in the Slimeball Bowl-O-Rama (also known as The Imp) is a 1988 American comedy horror film directed by David DeCoteau, loosely based on the classic short story "The Monkey's Paw". Notable for scream queens Linnea Quigley, Brinke Stevens, and Michelle Bauer appearing together, its plot follows an imp accidentally released and causing havoc among a group of teenagers inside a mall.

Filmed in 1987 and produced by Charles Band's Urban Classics, the film had a limited release in January 1988 and was released to home video the same month. In later years, it gained recognition as a "so-bad-it's-good" cult film.

== Plot ==
Three nerdy frat boys, Calvin, Jimmie, and Keith, follow and spy on the Tri-Delta sorority group and are caught by pledges Taffy and Lisa and members Babs, Rhonda, and Frankie. The boys are sent with the girls on a mission to steal a trophy from a nearby bowling alley. Unbeknownst to them, Babs' father runs the mall where the bowling alley is located and watches the group through security cameras.

The group enters the bowling alley and encounters Spider, a stoic biker burgling the alley with a crowbar. With her help, they break into the trophy room and, upon accidentally dropping the bowling trophy, unleash an imp named Uncle Impie who offers each of them one wish for freeing him. Jimmie wishes for gold, Taffy to be Prom Queen, and Keith to have sex with Lisa. Lisa does not get a wish, and she is transformed into a sex vixen. Suspicious of the imp, Spider and Calvin do not make a wish.

Uncle Impie attacks the sorority members, turning Frankie into the Bride of Frankenstein and Rhonda into a demon minion. The group finds out that the wishes requested were not really granted, with Jimmie's gold made out of wood and Taffy's dress disappearing.

The minions kill Jimmie and use his head as a bowling ball. Spider and Calvin hide from Rhonda in a closet, where they find a pistol. They shoot Rhonda and find the janitor, who reveals that the imp was summoned to help a lousy bowler become a champion and was trapped for thirty years because it killed people. After Spider and Calvin find the janitor dead, they are chased by Frankie with an axe. Spider gains the upper hand and decapitates her, and the severed head knocks the doors open. As Calvin starts a car and is attacked by Rhonda from the backseat, Spider traps Uncle Impie in a box. Calvin struggles to control the car, and ends up crashing upside down. Spider cries out for Calvin and runs to his aid. Calvin survives while Rhonda is killed from the crash.

As day breaks, Spider drives Calvin to her house on her motorcycle while Uncle Impie is seen trapped in the box at the curb asking for someone, including members of the audience of the film, to let him out.

== Cast ==
- Linnea Quigley as "Spider"
- Andras Jones as Calvin
- Robin Rochelle as Barbara "Babs" Peterson
- Carla Baron as Frankie
- Kathi O'Brecht as Rhonda
- John Stuart Wildman as Keith
- Hal Havins as Jimmie
- Brinke Stevens as "Taffy"
- Michelle Bauer as Lisa
- Dukey Flyswatter as Uncle Impie (credited as The Imp)
- George "Buck" Flower as The Janitor

== Production ==
Production for the film began and ended within 12 days in September 1987, in the state of California. Filming locations included the Plaza Camino Real and Eagle One Bowl. Due to the low budget, the movie had to be filmed in the bowling alley at night when it was closed, until 9 a.m., when it opened.

The director, David DeCoteau, was referenced in the story as David McCabe, and his film Creepozoids can be seen on Calvin's television in the beginning.

Early trailers for the film featured a high-pitched voice for the Imp; the final film used a lower-pitched voice. The bowling trophy from which Uncle Impie is released is made out of balsa wood.

After production ended, DeCoteau reused the same cast and crew in Nightmare Sisters.

== Release ==
The film was given a limited release theatrically in the United States by the Charles Band-funded Urban Classics in January 1988.

It was released on VHS on January 26, 1988 by Urban Classics Video. The film was titled The Imp for its home video release in the United Kingdom, and also aired on USA Up All Night in the early 1990s.

Cult Video, a subsidiary of Full Moon Entertainment, released the film on DVD in the United States in 1999.

== Reception ==
From contemporary reviews, the film was reviewed by a critic credited as "Lor." in Variety who reviewed the film on January 30, 1988. "Lor." stated the film begins like a wornout genre of nerds/peeping toms looming over attractive young women but that the "story takes a more interesting turn with the involvement of the imp. "Lor." continued that the creature was "an okay creation" and praised Michelle Bauer and Linnea Quigley in their respective roles.

JoBlo.com and Cinema Crazed both wrote favorable reviews of the movie, the latter writing, "It's trash, there's no arguing that, but in the end it's entertaining trash". Daily Grindhouse had a similar opinion, stating, "If you watch it with a sense that what you’re basically doing the visual equivalent of eating an entire box of BooBerry cereal, you can take these matters with a grain of salt, and enjoy it for its ridiculousness, and for the funny Imp puppet." AllMovie panned the film and gave it one star. Michael Jausonis of the Providence Journal declared it "half a star, but the title deserves five stars".

== Static-X Usage ==
The American Industrial Metal band, Static-X used a snippet of audio between Andras Jones' character, Calvin talking to Linnea Quigley's character, Spider, in their song "I'm With Stupid" off of their 1999 studio album Wisconsin Death Trip.

== Sequel ==
In April 2019, Full Moon Features announced a sequel to the film as part of their Deadly Ten promotion. The planned film promises the return of the stars of the original film - Linnea Quigley, Brinke Stevens, and Michelle Bauer - along with original director David DeCoteau, who will co-direct with Stevens.

Full Moon Features released Sorority Babes in the Slimeball Bowl-O-Rama 2 on December 2, 2022. The film was directed by Brinke Stevens. Stevens and Michelle Bauer, her co-star from the original film, have cameos. They are joined in the cast by Kelli Maroney, Glory Rodriguez, and Audrey Neal.
