= Stacy Lande =

American painter

Stacy Lande is a contemporary lowbrow painter.

== Biography ==
Stacy Lande was born in Granada Hills, in the San Fernando Valley region of Los Angeles, California. From an early age she took pride in both stage performance and her art. Lande was formally trained in art at California State University, Northridge. After graduation from art school, she began doing performance art at clubs like Sin-a-Matic and LACE (Los Angeles Contemporary Exhibitions).

Lande has painted more than 120 portraits of both men and women in deified and dramatic light. In her book Vicious, Delicious and Ambitious, Sherri Cullision describes Lande as creating "demons and she gods, hinting at both their ‘phantastical’ pasts and immortual futures.”

Lande's work has been featured in various magazines, including Juxtapoz, Juxtapoz Erotica, Detour magazine, and Petersen's Hot Rod Deluxe, as well as in the film Gone in 60 Seconds. She has been interviewed on National Public Radio's Airtalk with Larry Mantle. In addition to her own book The Red Box, Lande's work is also included in lowbrow compilations Vicious, Delicious and Ambitious, and Weirdo Deluxe, by Matt Dukes Jordan (Chronicle Books, 2005). Her work has been seen in solo and group shows in Billy Shire's La Luz de Jesus Gallery, Los Angeles, and Copro/Nason and Track 16 Gallery at Bergamot Station. Her work appears in collections in Japan, The Netherlands, Switzerland, Germany and England.
