= Hollywood Chainsaw Hookers =

1988 film by Fred Olen Ray

- Theatrical release poster
- Directed by: Fred Olen Ray
- Written by: Fred Olen Ray (as Dr. S. Carver); T. L. Lankford (as B.J. Nestles)
- Produced by: Fred Olen Ray
- Starring: Gunnar Hansen; Linnea Quigley; Jay Richardson; Michelle Bauer
- Distributed by: Camp Motion Pictures
- Release date: March 1988
- Running time: 75 minutes
- Country: United States
- Language: English
- Budget: $60,000 or $95,000

Hollywood Chainsaw Hookers (also known as simply Hollywood Hookers in the United Kingdom) is a 1988 American black comedy horror film directed by Fred Olen Ray, and starring Gunnar Hansen, Linnea Quigley, Jay Richardson, and Michelle Bauer. It is known as a B-movie.

== Plot ==
The private detective Jack Chandler tries to track down Samantha, a teenage runaway. He runs into a cult of Egyptian chainsaw-worshipping prostitutes led by "The Stranger".

== Disclaimer and announcements ==
The film's tagline was "They Charge an Arm and a Leg!"

The film begins with the disclaimer "The chainsaws used in this motion picture are real and dangerous! They are handled here by seasoned professionals. The makers of this motion picture advise strongly against anyone attempting to perform these stunts at home. Especially if you are naked and about to engage in strenuous sex." The film ends with the promise of the sequel Student Chainsaw Nurses, which was never made.

== Cast ==
- Linnea Quigley as Samantha
- Gunnar Hansen as The Stranger
- Jay Richardson as Jack Chandler
- Dawn Wildsmith as Lori
- Michelle Bauer as Mercedes
- Esther Elise as Lisa
- Tricia Burns as Ilsa
- Susie Wilson as Sally
- Fox Harris as Hermie
- Jimmy Williams as Bo
- Dukey Flyswatter as Jake, The Bartender
- Dennis T. Mooney as Mick Harris
- Jerry Miller as Murphy
- Gary J. Levinson as Nubian
- Christopher Ray as Kid At Bar (uncredited)

== Release ==
At the time, the UK video release was not allowed to have the word Chainsaw in the title, so the film was released simply as "Hollywood Hookers" (a drawing of a chainsaw replaced the missing word on the cover sleeve).

== Reception ==
Hollywood Chainsaw Hookers received mixed reviews from critics and audiences, earning a Rotten Tomatoes Want-To-See score of 33%.

The film is said to have "set the course for Ray". The film has been described as a horror parody and a film-noir spoof.

== Home media ==
Hollywood Chainsaw Hookers has been released on VHS, DVD and Blu-ray format.

In the United States, the film was released in a '20th Anniversary Widescreen Edition' DVD on August 5, 2008. It was made available on Blu-ray in two individual editions on January 9, 2015, with a standard edition and a signed 'Special Limited Edition' of 1000 copies.

In the United Kingdom, the film was released on DVD on July 10, 2000. 88 Films has released the film on Blu-ray on March 23, 2015 as part of the 'Slasher Classics Collection'. It is placed at #6 and like the other films released in the collection, it contains a reversible sleeve.

== Sources ==
- Thompson, Nathaniel (2006) [2002]. DVD Delirium: The International Guide to Weird and Wonderful Films on DVD; Volume 1 Redux. Godalming, England: FAB Press. pp. 360–361. ISBN 1-903254-39-6.

== See also ==
- Chainsaws in popular culture
