= Head Case (film) =

- Directed by: Anthony Spadaccini
- Written by: Anthony Spadaccini
- Produced by: Anthony Spadaccini; Benjamin P. Ablao, Jr.
- Starring: Paul McCloskey; Barbara Lessin; Brinke Stevens; Bruce De Santis; Emily Spiegel; Michael J. Panichelli Jr.
- Music by: Gerard Satamian
- Distributed by: Fleet Street Films; B.P.A. Productions Group, Inc. Brain Damage Films
- Release date: September 8, 2007 (Newark Film Festival)
- Running time: 101 minutes
- Country: United States
- Language: English
- Budget: $5,000

Head Case is a 2007 pseudo-documentary (cinéma vérité) horror film written and directed by Anthony Spadaccini.

The film is presented as a collection of home movies from serial killers Wayne and Andrea Montgomery, middle-class suburban residents of Claymont, Delaware who film their sadistic crimes.

== Cast ==
- Paul McCloskey as Wayne Montgomery
- Barbara Lessin as Andrea Montgomery
- Brinke Stevens as Julie
- Bruce De Santis as Todd Montgomery
- Emily Spiegel as Monica Montgomery
- Michael J. Panichelli Jr. as Detective John Haynes

== Sequel ==
- The Ritual (2009)
