= Linnea Quigley =

American actress, film producer, model, singer, and author

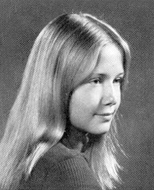
- Quigley in 1976
- Born: Barbara Linnea Quigley; 1957 or 1958 (age 67–68); Davenport, Iowa, U.S.
- Occupations: Actress; film producer; model; singer; author
- Years active: 1978-present
- Height: 5 ft 2 in (1.57 m)
- Spouse: Steve Johnson (m. 1990; div. 1992)
- Website: www.linnea-quigley.com

Barbara Linnea Quigley (born 1957 or 1958) is an American actress, best known for appearing in low-budget horror films during the 1980s and 1990s establishing herself as a Scream Queen. Quigley first pursued her career in the late 1970s, shortly after moving to Los Angeles. While working at Jack LaLanne's health spa, she was encouraged by her friends to try modeling, and also began taking acting and guitar-playing classes. After appearing as an extra in various films, Quigley got her first acting role in the Charles Band-produced film Fairy Tales (1978). She continued receiving small parts, mostly in B movies. Her first bigger part was in the 1981 slasher film Graduation Day. Quigley followed with more films such as Savage Streets (1984) and Silent Night, Deadly Night (1984).

In 1985, Quigley appeared in the zombie horror film The Return of the Living Dead playing a teenaged punk who performs a striptease in a graveyard, which is considered one of her most notable roles and earned her "scream queen" status. During the second half of the 1980s, Quigley starred in a number of low-budget films following the popularization of home video. She repeatedly worked with the directors David DeCoteau (Creepozoids, Nightmare Sisters, and Sorority Babes in the Slimeball Bowl-O-Rama) and Kevin Tenney (Night of the Demons and Witchtrap), and appeared alongside fellow scream queens Brinke Stevens and Michelle Bauer. By the end of the 1980s, Quigley decided to take a different direction and starred in the first two films of Rick Sloane's comedy series Vice Academy. However, she continued being type cast as a victim in horror films.

Aside from her acting career, Quigley is also a singer (she formed an all-female band, The Skirts, in the early 1980s) and an author (she wrote three books: The Linnea Quigley Bio & Chainsaw Book, I'm Screaming as Fast as I Can: My Life in B-Movies, and Skin). She is also an animal rights activist and a member of PETA.

== Career ==
=== Early life and career beginnings ===
Quigley grew up in Davenport, Iowa, the daughter of Dorothy and William Heath Quigley. Her father was a chiropractor. He worked as an executive vice president at Palmer College of Chiropractic. An only child, Quigley attended Garfield Elementary and Sudlow Middle Schools in Davenport. In 1972, she began attending Bettendorf High School in Bettendorf, Iowa. Quigley later reminisced about her school years: "I was so shy. I didn't move my mouth, didn't sing in glee club or anything like that, didn't do any plays. I was terribly, terribly shy."

Shortly after graduating from high school in 1976, Quigley moved with her parents to Los Angeles. She landed a job at Jack LaLanne's health spa, where she met models who worked in films by doing work as extras. Encouraged by her friends, Quigley began taking acting and guitar-playing classes. One of her earliest acting jobs was a television commercial for Close-Up toothpaste. After getting a few extra parts, she got her first acting role in the Charles Band-produced erotic comedy Fairy Tales (1978), wherein she appeared as Sleeping Beauty. Her next role was in the pseudo-documentary Auditions (1978), again produced by Band and directed by Harry Hurwitz. She continued receiving small parts in films such as Don't Go Near the Park (1981) and the slasher Graduation Day (1981). She was given the role of Dolores after in the latter film after the original actress refused to do nude scenes. In 1981, producer and director Jim Feazell decided to shoot some additional footage for the reissue of his unsuccessful 1975 psychological thriller Wheeler. In one of the scenes, Quigley played a waitress menaced by a truck driver. The movie was re-released under the title The Hurting and later changed to Psycho from Texas.

Besides modeling and auditioning for films, Quigley also began auditioning for bands that would let her join in. She first played guitar in an all-female band, Mad Whistle, started by singer and songwriter Lucrecia Sarita Russo. Russo's then-husband Jeffrey Spry appeared alongside Quigley in the film Graduation Day with his band Felony. Quigley then managed to form her own band called The Skirts. Her friend Haydee Pomar, whom she met on the set of Cheech & Chong's comedy Nice Dreams (1981), played the bass guitar. They practiced in the basement of the punk rock club The Masque and their music got featured in some of Quigley's later movies. Their song "Santa Monica Blvd. Boy" was released on Mystic Records' 1983 compilation The Sound of Hollywood Girls.

=== Acting career ===
Quigley is best known for her role in The Return of the Living Dead (1985) (directed by Dan O'Bannon). She has also starred in dozens of other horror films, including Savage Streets (with Linda Blair), Silent Night, Deadly Night, Nightmare Sisters, Creepozoids, Sorority Babes in the Slimeball Bowl-O-Rama, Hollywood Chainsaw Hookers, Night of the Demons (the 1988 original and the 2009 remake), and A Nightmare on Elm Street 4: The Dream Master. Quigley is the author of two books about her career as a B-movie actress, Chainsaw and I'm Screaming as Fast as I Can. She has been called the "Queen of the Bs".

Linnea co-starred with Daniel Baldwin in Stripperland (2011). She played in David DeCoteau's movies 1313: Cougar Cult (2012) and 3 Scream Queens (2014), and Charles Band's web series Trophy Heads (2014) with Brinke Stevens and Michelle Bauer. In 2012, Quigley guest appeared in Massachusetts death metal band Sexcrement's music video entitled "Trucker Bombed".

Alongside regular co-stars Brinke Stevens, and Michelle Bauer, Quigley appeared in and was a main subject for the 2011 documentary Screaming in High Heels: The Rise & Fall of the Scream Queen Era and its 2020 follow up Screaming in High Heels: The Reunion. According to Deadline Hollywood and Horror Fuel magazine, Linnea will co-star alongside horror icons Michael Berryman, Bill Moseley and Kane Hodder in the 2022 feature Jasper, produced by Shaun Cairo.

== Personal life ==
=== Relationships ===
During the filming of Night of the Demons (1988), Quigley began a relationship with special-effects artist Steve Johnson. Later, while working on the film A Nightmare on Elm Street 4: The Dream Master (1988), Johnson proposed to Quigley on the set. "I actually got engaged on the set of that movie right after coming out of Freddy's chest. He gave me a ring so that was funny. While he's hosing my K-Y Jelly off me and after it fell over almost killing us and some others, he still managed to ask me to marry him." They married on January 17, 1990, but divorced in 1992.

=== Veganism ===
Quigley is a vegan. She switched to a vegetarian diet in the late 1970s after her move to Los Angeles, first by eliminating red meat, then chicken and fish, and eventually all dairy and all other foods from animals. She is an animal-rights activist and an active member of the animal-rights organization PETA. In October 1990, she appeared on the cover of Vegetarian Times.

== Discography ==
- The Skirts
- Linnea Quigley and the Bi-Polar Bears: Surfboards and Chainsaws (2002)

== Bibliography ==
- The Linnea Quigley Bio & Chainsaw Book (1991)
- Skin (1993)
- I'm Screaming as Fast as I Can: My Life in B-Movies (1995)
