= Creepozoids =

1987 film by David DeCoteau

- Theatrical release poster
- Directed by: David DeCoteau
- Written by: David DeCoteau; Buford Hauser
- Produced by: David DeCoteau; John Schouweiler
- Starring: Linnea Quigley; Ken Abraham; Kim McKamy; Michael Aranda
- Cinematography: Thomas L. Callaway
- Edited by: Miriam L. Preissel
- Music by: Guy Moon
- Production companies: Empire Pictures; Beyond Infinity; Titan Productions
- Distributed by: Urban Classics
- Release date: October 2, 1987
- Running time: 72 minutes (US); 69 minutes (UK)
- Country: United States
- Language: English
- Budget: $150,000

Creepozoids is a 1987 American science fiction horror film directed by David DeCoteau, and starring Linnea Quigley, Ken Abraham, Michael Aranda, Richard S. Hawkins and Kim McKamy (also known as Ashlyn Gere). It was the first DeCoteau-directed film to be shot on 35 mm film.

Creepozoids received generally negative reviews. It was remade in 1997 as Hybrid, directed by Fred Olen Ray.

== Plot ==
Set in 1998, six years after an apocalyptic nuclear war, a group of five military deserters, including a soldier named Kate and her boyfriend, seek refuge from the toxic environment in an abandoned laboratory. They hope to find shelter and supplies to survive in the harsh new world.

As they explore the underground facility, the group discovers signs of previous experiments and unethical scientific practices. Soon, they realize they are not alone. Strange and horrifying creatures, the result of a genetic experiment gone wrong, begin to stalk and attack the survivors.

Trapped in the underground facility with limited resources, the group must confront not only the mutant creatures but also the dark secrets of the lab. Tensions rise as trust issues and personal conflicts surface among the survivors. They must band together to face the mutant threat and uncover the truth behind the experiments that led to the creation of the Creepozoids.

== Cast ==
- Linnea Quigley as Blanca
- Ken Abraham as Butch
- Michael Aranda as Jesse
- Richard S. Hawkins (credited as Richard Hawkins) as Jake
- Ashlyn Gere (credited as Kim McKamy) as Kate
- Joi Wilson as Woman

== Production ==
In a 2001 interview, director David DeCoteau, when asked about the movie's production, stated, "Creepozoids was shot in 15 days in a warehouse in Los Angeles. I think the budget was something like 150k. It was a difficult shoot because of all the FX and monster sequences. Lotsa slime and very ambitious. Linnea Quigley starred in it and we had a great time working together. It was my first feature shot in 35 mm. It was theatrically released and a hit on video."

Cast member Ashlyn Gere was a noted pornographic film actress.

== Reception ==
Critical reception for the film has been mostly negative. TV Guide awarded the film 1 star out of 4 calling it an Alien imitation. Editor of Psychotronic Video, Michael Weldon, described the creature effects as "pretty bad", saying the baby monster at the film's end was the "only scary part".

== Home media ==
The film was first released on DVD by Full Moon Home Video on December 9, 2003. Since then it has been released multiple times by different studios.

== Canceled sequel ==
Plans for a sequel began in 1988 but fell through due to rights issues following the collapse of Empire Pictures.

== See also ==
- Shocking Dark
