= The Phantom Empire =

1935 serial film

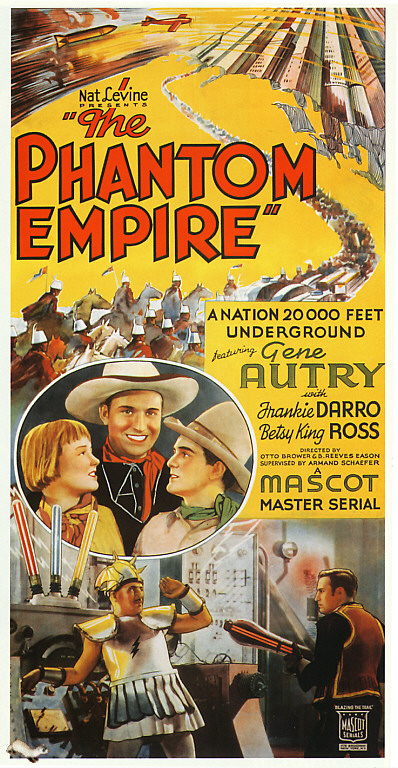
- Theatrical release poster
- Directed by: Otto Brower; B. Reeves Eason
- Written by: Wallace MacDonald; Gerald Geraghty; Hy Freedman; Maurice Geraghty
- Produced by: Nat Levine
- Starring: Gene Autry; Frankie Darro; Betsy King Ross; Dorothy Christy; Wheeler Oakman
- Cinematography: Ernest Miller; William Nobles
- Edited by: Earl Turner; Walter Thompson
- Music by: Hugo Riesenfeld
- Distributed by: Mascot Pictures
- Release date: February 23, 1935 (USA)
- Running time: 245 minutes (12 chapters) (Note: Chapter 1 is 30 minutes. Chapters 2–12 are 18–20 minutes.)
- Country: United States
- Language: English
- Budget: $75,000

The Phantom Empire, Chapter 1: Singing Cowboy.

Radio Ranch, a 70-minute feature film edited from the serial

The Phantom Empire is a 1935 American Western serial film directed by Otto Brower and B. Reeves Eason and starring Gene Autry, Frankie Darro, and Betsy King Ross. This 12-chapter Mascot Pictures serial combined the Western, musical, and science-fiction genres. The duration of the first episode is 30 minutes, while those of the rest are about 20 minutes. The serial film is about a singing cowboy who stumbles upon an ancient subterranean civilization living beneath his own ranch that becomes corrupted by unscrupulous, greedy speculators from the surface. In 1940, a 70-minute feature film edited from the serial was released under the titles Radio Ranch or Men with Steel Faces. This was Gene Autry's first starring role, playing himself as a singing cowboy. It is considered to be the first science-fiction Western.

== Plot ==
Gene Autry (as himself) is a singing cowboy who runs Radio Ranch, a dude ranch from which he fulfils a contract to makes a daily live radio broadcast starting at 2:00 pm. Gene has two young sidekicks, Frankie Baxter (Frankie Darro) and Betsy Baxter (Betsy King Ross), who lead a club, the Junior Thunder Riders, in which they play at being armored knights of an unknown civilization, the mysterious Thunder Riders, who make a sound like thunder when they ride. The kids, dressing up in capes and water-bucket helmets, play at riding "To the rescue!" (their motto).

A chance to become real heroes occurs when Betsy, Frankie, and Gene are kidnapped by the real Thunder Riders from the super-scientific underground empire of Murania, complete with towering buildings, robots, ray guns, advanced television, elevator tubes that extend miles from the surface, and the icy, blonde, evil Queen Tika (played by Dorothy Christy). On the surface, criminals led by Professor Beetson (Frank Glendon) plan to invade Murania and seize its radium wealth, while in Murania, Lord Argo (Wheeler Oakman) plots to overthrow Queen Tika.

The inhabitants of Murania are the lost tribe of Mu, who went underground in the last glacial period 100,000 years ago and now live in a fantastically advanced city 25,000 feet below the surface. They cannot now breathe the air at ground level and must wear oxygen masks. (Surface dwellers have no trouble breathing Muranian air.) The Thunder Guard emerges to the surface world from a cave with a huge rock door that swings up like a garage door. Both Muranians and Professor Beetson want to get rid of Autry, the latter so that he loses his radio contract and Radio Ranch is vacated.

== Cast ==
- Gene Autry as Gene Autry, singing cowboy at the Radio Ranch
- Frankie Darro as Frankie Baxter, one of Gene's sidekicks
- Betsy King Ross as Betsy Baxter, another of Gene's sidekicks
- Dorothy Christy as Queen Tika, the evil queen of Murania
- Wheeler Oakman as Lord Argo, the Muranian High Chancellor and leader of the rebels
- Charles K. French as Mal
- Warner Richmond as Rab
- J. Frank Glendon as Professor Beetson, the villainous scientist after the land's radium deposits
- Smiley Burnette as Oscar, comic relief (Note: Beginning with Sagebrush Troubadour in 1935, Burnette played the character of Frog Millhouse in 60 Autry films.)
- Peter Potter as Pete, comic relief
- Edward Peil Sr. as Cooper
- Jack Carlyle as Saunders

== Production ==
=== Story ===
The idea for the plot came to writer Wallace MacDonald when he was under gas having a tooth extracted.

=== Filming and budget ===
The Phantom Empire was filmed in late 1934. It had an operating budget of US$75,000 (equivalent to $1,805,000 in 2025). The budget was originally reported to have been "no more than" US$100,000 (equivalent to $2,407,000 in 2025).

=== Filming locations ===
- Agoura Ranch, Agoura, California, USA
- Bronson Canyon, Griffith Park, 4730 Crystal Springs Drive, Los Angeles, California, USA
- Griffith Observatory, Griffith Park, 4730 Crystal Springs Drive, Los Angeles
- Iverson Ranch, 1 Iverson Lane, Chatsworth, Los Angeles
- Keystone Studios, 1712 Glendale Blvd., Silver Lake, Los Angeles

=== Stuntwork ===
- Ken Cooper
- Richard Talmadge
- Jack Jones
- George Magrill
- Wally West

Frankie Darro and Betsy King Ross did their own stunt riding in this serial. Ross was an experienced rodeo performer and was billed as the "World's Champion Trick Rider".

=== Soundtrack ===
- "Uncle Noah's Ark" (Gene Autry, Smiley Burnette, Nick Manoloff) by Gene Autry and band (chapter 1)
- "That Silver-Haired Daddy of Mine" (Gene Autry, Jimmy Long) by Gene Autry and band (chapter 1)
- "I'm Oscar, I'm Pete" (Gene Autry, Smiley Burnette) by Gene Autry, Smiley Burnette, and William Moore (chapter 2)
- "No Need to Worry" (Gene Autry, Smiley Burnette) by the Radio Rangers (chapter 4)
- "Uncle Henry" (Gene Autry, Smiley Burnette) by Gene Autry (chapter 4)
- "I'm Getting a Moon's Eye View of the World" (Gene Autry, Smiley Burnette) by Gene Autry (chapter 8)
- "My Cross Eyed Gal" (Gene Autry, Jimmy Long) by the Radio Rangers (chapter 8)
- "Just Come On Back" (Gene Autry, Smiley Burnette) by the Radio Rangers (chapter 8)

== Chapter titles ==
1. "The Singing Cowboy"
2. "The Thunder Riders"
3. "The Lightning Chamber"
4. "Phantom Broadcast"
5. "Beneath the Earth"
6. "Disaster from the Skies"
7. "From Death to Life"
8. "Jaws of Jeopardy"
9. "Prisoners of the Ray"
10. "The Rebellion"
11. "A Queen in Chains"
12. "The End of Murania"

== Reception ==
On February 23, 1935 (91 years ago), the first chapter of The Phantom Empire was released in theaters. The serial was a "marked box-office success".

== Cultural references ==
The 1979 television series Cliffhangers, which attempted to recreate the old movie serial feel by showing three serial chapters in each episode, included a serial titled "The Secret Empire", a pastiche of The Phantom Empire. Events in the underground empire were shown in color, but events on the surface were "in glorious black and white". Stock footage from the serial and other serials was used in the animated series Muppet Babies.

Fred Olen Ray in 1988 filmed a movie with the same title about treasure hunters braving a cavern system populated by troglodytes and other subterranean hazards to finally encounter an underground lost civilization. The movie makes reference to the serial and was itself in the end credits planned to have sequels that never were produced.

Alejandro Pérez Cervantes' short-story collection, Murania, was inspired by the aesthetic of Murania and the lost continent of Mu as depicted in the film. It received the 2006 Julio Torri national award for short fiction in Mexico.

The web series The Sam Plenty Cavalcade of Action Show Plus Singing! was inspired by the serial.

The UK Channel 4 show Exploitica lampooned the serial, adding comedic sound effects, thought bubbles, and captions to each episode.

The serial was a childhood favorite of comic strip writer Tom Batiuk, and in tribute, it has been frequently referenced in his strips Funky Winkerbean and Crankshaft, predominantly as the favorite film of Crankshaft character Jeff Murdoch. Most notably, one 2020 storyline in Funky had Jeff and his grandson seeking refuge from a wildfire in the cave used for the film as the entrance to Murania, where they imagine being rescued by the Thunder Riders and taken into the city.

In John Crowley's novel Love & Sleep, characters watch a cowboy serial in which "Gene" enters a subterranean empire.

== See also ==
- The Mound by H. P. Lovecraft from a short description by Zealia Bishop — underground civilization fiction also set in the southwest USA, part of the Cthulhu Mythos
- Richard Shaver— claimed to know of a civilization such as this
- List of film serials
- List of film serials by studio

Preceded by Mystery Mountain (1934)	Mascot Serial; The Phantom Empire (1935)	Succeeded by The Miracle Rider (1935)
