= Gerry Shamray =

American comic book artist (1957–2023)

- Born: February 19, 1957 Cleveland, Ohio, U.S.
- Died: September 25, 2023 (aged 66)
- Area: Artist
- Notable works: American Splendor; John Darling
- Spouse: Tracy Lippert (m. 2004)

Gerald James Shamray (February 19, 1957 – September 25, 2023) was an American comic book artist known for his work on Harvey Pekar's autobiographical comic book series American Splendor and the syndicated comic strip John Darling.

== Biography ==
The son of Edward and Roselyn Shamray, Shamray attended Cuyahoga Community College from 1975 to 1977, and the Cooper School of Art from 1977 to 1980 (when he graduated). While at the Cooper School, Shamray was contacted by Pekar about illustrating his work. Shamray illustrated stories in every issue of American Splendor from 1979 to 1983, as well as a few later stories. In an introduction to a compilation of Pekar's work, Robert Crumb stated that Shamray "went all the way, taking hundreds of photos of Pekar, his wife, his apartment, the streets of his neighborhood, and so on, and drew from the photos."

During the period he was working on American Splendor, Shamray drew caricatures of notable Clevelanders for the comic strip Cleveland, which appeared in the Cleveland Press.

From 1985 to 1989, Shamray was the artist of the Tom Batiuk-created comic strip, John Darling, replacing original artist Tom Armstrong. (He had previously illustrated a few weeks of Batiuk's strip Funky Winkerbean).

Beginning in 1988, Shamray was on staff as a graphics editor at the Sun Newspapers in the Greater Cleveland area for more than 20 years. While there, he developed, designed, and edited the chain's weekly entertainment supplement, Weekend.

In later years, Shamray was an adjunct professor at the Cleveland Institute of Art.

Gerry Shamray died on September 25, 2023, at the age of 66.
