= Crankshaft (disambiguation) =

A crankshaft is the part of an engine which translates reciprocating linear piston motion into rotation.

Crankshaft can also mean:

- Crankshaft (comic strip), a comic strip by Tom Batiuk
- Crankshaft (JavaScript), name for compilation technology in the V8 JavaScript engine by Google
- Douglas Murray (ice hockey), an ice hockey player nicknamed "Crankshaft"
