= John Darling (comic strip) =

American comic strip by Tom Batiuk

- Author: Tom Batiuk
- Illustrator(s): Tom Armstrong (1979–1985, 1990); Gerry Shamray (1985–1989); Bob Vojtko (1989-1990)
- Current status/schedule: Concluded daily strip
- Launch date: March 25, 1979
- End date: August 4, 1990
- Syndicate(s): Field Newspaper Syndicate (1979–1984); News America Syndicate (1984–1986); North America Syndicate (1986–1988); King Features Syndicate (1988–1990)
- Genre(s): Humor, Satire
- Preceded by: Funky Winkerbean

John Darling is an American comic strip, created by Tom Batiuk, a spin-off of his earlier comic strip Funky Winkerbean. John Darling appeared from March 25, 1979, to August 4, 1990.

== Storyline and characters ==
John Darling, a talk-show host, was originally a supporting character in Batiuk's strip Funky Winkerbean before being spun off into his own strip. Much of the strip's humor came from Darling's outsized ego, quirks, and frequent displays of ignorance; in one strip, he interviews musician Prince, asking him "Exactly which country are you a prince of?"

Other featured characters were Darling's co-workers at "Channel One", the TV station where he worked, including ratings-obsessed producer Reed Roberts; clueless old-school anchor Charlie Lord; shrewish reporter Brenda Harpy; and insecure weatherman Phil. The strip also featured a large number of parodic appearances by celebrities (often being interviewed by Darling); this was such a feature of the strip that numerous newspapers carried John Darling on their TV page, rather than the comics page. During Gary Shamray's tenure on the strip, Sunday strips generally included two panels of Shamray-authored "TV Trivia" content otherwise unrelated to the strip as a whole.

== History ==
John Darling debuted in March 1979 in 22 newspapers. The strip's original artist was Tom Armstrong, who left in 1985 for his own creation, Marvin, though he did return to draw the feature's final three weeks. His replacement was Gerry Shamray, whose first strip was dated March 3, 1985. Shamray left in late 1989, and was replaced by Bob Vojtko from November 1989 through July 1990.

John Darling wound down in 1990, as writer Batiuk by his own account was growing tired of the work it involved. Perhaps even more of a factor was that the strip was no longer financially remunerative, as it had been dropped by numerous newspapers. With John Darling having been dropped by a number of newspapers over the years, the syndicate decided the strip was simply no longer profitable, and allowed it to die.

Batiuk, who had a contractual conflict with his syndicate (King Features Syndicate) over ownership of the character, stunned the strip's remaining readers by killing off Darling in the next-to-last strip. (The final strip featured other characters gathered around Darling's gravesite.)

== Darling's murder later solved in Funky Winkerbean ==
John Darling's murder (which had been depicted as being by an unknown assailant) stayed unsolved until a 1997 Funky Winkerbean storyline celebrating that strip's 25th anniversary. Over the course of the storyline, Winkerbean character Les Moore wrote a book on Darling's murder ("Fallen Star") and solved the case. The murderer was revealed to be Peter Moss, alias Plantman, an occasional character in the strip who reported on gardening and environmental issues. (Plantman had actually uttered the very last words in the John Darling strip, while standing next to Darling's headstone: "Goodbye, old friend.")

While Darling himself was rarely mentioned in Funky Winkerbean in the years immediately following his 1990 demise, Darling's daughter Jessica appeared as a regular in the Funky Winkerbean strip until 2007, when the feature was retconned by moving the continuing story up several years. The book about Darling's murder was referenced again during a 2010 strip, and Jessica reappeared in 2011. By 2013, John was mentioned quite often, as a continuing Funky Winkerbean plotline had Jessica actively searching for information about the father she lost at a very young age. Phil the Forecaster also made very, very occasional appearances in Funky Winkerbean, reappearing most recently in 2017 as he retired from his weather forecasting job at Channel One after over 40 years. Funky Winkerbean ended in 2022, but several minor characters in Funky Winkerbean's other spin-off strip Crankshaft have also worked at Channel One, and there are still very occasional tangential and oblique John Darling references in Crankshaft, which is still a current strip.
