= Tom Armstrong (cartoonist) =

American cartoonist (born 1950)

Tom Armstrong (born 1950, Evansville, Indiana) is an American cartoonist and the creator of the daily newspaper comic strip Marvin, which he has written and drawn continuously since its creation in 1982.

He was also the original artist on Tom Batiuk's newspaper comic strip John Darling, which he drew from 1979 through 1985; he left the strip in 1985 to concentrate on Marvin, with Gerry Shamray replacing Armstrong on the John Darling strip.

He received the Elzie Segar Award in 1996. Armstrong graduated from the University of Evansville.
