= The Phantom Empire (1988 film) =

1987 film directed by Fred Olen Ray

- U.S. cover art
- Directed by: Fred Olen Ray
- Written by: Fred Olen Ray; T.L. Lankford
- Produced by: Fred Olen Ray
- Starring: Ross Hagen; Jeffrey Combs; Dawn Wildsmith; Robert Quarry; Sybil Danning
- Cinematography: Gary Graver
- Edited by: William Shaffer
- Music by: Robert Garrett
- Production company: American Independent Productions
- Distributed by: Prism Entertainment (U.S.)
- Release date: June 18, 1988 (Japan)
- Running time: 85 minutes
- Country: United States
- Language: English
- Budget: $120,000–135,000

The Phantom Empire or just Phantom Empire is a 1988 American science fiction horror comedy film directed by Fred Olen Ray, starring Ross Hagen, Jeffrey Combs, Dawn Wildsmith, Robert Quarry and Sybil Danning. It is a loose re-imagining of the eponymous 1935 serial.

== Plot summary ==
A mysterious cave monster attacks a man at a public park. The victim succumbs, but the woman accompanying him manages to bludgeon the creature to death. A necklace, adorned with uncut diamonds worth some $500,000, is found on its corpse. Denae Chambers hires the C&C Salvage Company, run by grizzled Cort Eastman and cynical Eddy Colchilde, to find more of the gems. Denae is the daughter of the now deceased Dr. Chambers, an old acquaintance of Eastman who dedicated his life to finding Rilya, a fabled underground kingdom and the stones' likely source. The trio is accompanied on their quest by archaeological intern Andrew Paris and veteran mineralogist Professor Strock.

== Cast ==
- Ross Hagen as Cort Eastman
- Dawn Wildsmith as Eddy Colchilde
- Jeffrey Combs as Andrew Paris
- Robert Quarry as Professor Strock
- Sybil Danning as Alien Queen
- Susan Stokey as Denae Chambers
- Michelle Bauer as Cave Bunny
- Russ Tamblyn as Bill

== Production ==
=== Development ===
After realizing how little of his films' proceeds he saw when working as a director for hire, Fred Olen Ray decided to branch into production. While filming Commando Squad at Bronson Canyon, Ray decided that the area would make a convenient central location for his first self-owned effort. He tentatively named the film The Phantom Empire, after a classic serial that had been shot on the same premises. But he also contemplated the titles Back to the Center of the Earth and Beyond the Center of the Earth to exploit an adaptation of Journey to the Center of the Earth that Cannon was working on at the same time. When the Cannon film ran into problems, this promotional angle was abandoned.

Ray financed the majority of the budget with the proceeds of his early career, and a minority investor pitched in a further $20,000. He intended to shoot the film for under $100,000 but went slightly over, with the final costs estimated at $120,000 or $135,000 depending on recollections.

=== Casting ===
As The Phantom Empire's brief pre-production overlapped with the filming of Commando Squad, the director started making arrangement with players from that movie, such as the two leads Ross Hagen and Dawn Wildsmith, who was also Ray's wife. Ray already had actors in mind during writing, and filled the cast with people he had already worked with to optimize what would be a condensed schedule. Jeffrey Combs, who had just been in Ray's Cyclone, took the short assignment as a challenge, but later admitted that he'd "sooner forget about the whole affair". To entice Sybil Danning to participate for an affordable fee, she was given the film's German market rights. Michael Sonye was cast in the prologue to make use of a prop head of himself that he owned. Despite the modest budget, it was a union shoot sanctioned by SAG.

=== Preliminary photography ===
For the final stretch of the Commando Squad shoot, a cabin interior was built inside MovieTech Studios in Van Nuys. Ray thought he could re-use it for his own project, and wrote a 6-page sample set therein over one weekend. On the last day of filming (November 21, 1986), the director went around to crew members and offered them a small sum to stay after wrap and film the scene where the characters buy the treasure map, not knowing exactly when he would use it. But two days later, upon watching the dailies with cinematographer Gary Graver, the latter encouraged Ray to complete the movie right away, as the material looked superior to Commando Squad and he was soon due to depart for other commitments. Ray finished his draft in three or four days, before his usual screenwriter T.L. Lankford took a pass at it.

=== Principal photography ===
Principal photography proceeded very quickly on December 1, 1986, lasting only six days, albeit very long ones. One day was so busy that it required a 27-page call sheet. Ray was apprehensive about shooting on such a short schedule, so he scoured his B-movie collection to try and find ways to keep the film interesting while relying on time-saving master shots. He also took inspiration from The Brain from Planet Arous to make the small Bronson Caves look bigger on screen. To add depth to her mute character, Michelle Bauer incorporated body language derived from that of New Guinea tribespeople she had seen in a National Geographic documentary. On the other hand, Sybil Danning, who was cultivating a tough and stoic image at the time, asked Ray to cut one of her monologues and replace it with a simple nod.

In addition to Sonye's fake head, a large number of props were recycled from other movies. Ross Hagen brought his own gun, custom made in the Philippines during the making of Wonder Women. Others included the Land Master from the Logan's Run TV series, the spit from History of the World, Part I and Robby the Robot from Forbidden Planet. Robby was outfitted with a new head made by its then owner William Malone. The panels used for the Alien Queen's lair were recycled from Star Slammer.

=== Additional photography ===
Film Ventures International expressed interest in acquiring the film's rights, but demanded that it be lengthened by about ten minutes. The supplemental material, which brought back most of the main cast, was shot in Summer 1988 [per a DVD extra, although this is uncertain as the film's copyright is 1987] over a single day at Vasquez Rocks near Los Angeles. This allowed the easy integration of stop-motion battles taken from the 1977 film Planet of Dinosaurs, which had also been shot there, to spruce up the new scenes.

=== Special and visual effects ===
Most of the film's effects were achieved in-camera through simple forced perspective. The finale originally featured one such scene, where a dinosaur hand puppet popped out of a miniature volcano to attack Danning's character. It did not make the final cut, as it did not compare to the snippets of Planet of Dinosaurs spliced into the Vasquez Rock footage at a later stage (see above). However, the Vasquez Rock sessions allowed for a couple new miniatures, representing a dinosaur corpse and a field of giant diamonds. Wizard Works, an effects shop created by Mark Wolf of the dinosaur-themed short The Age of Mammals, contributed to the miniature work. Laser beams were rotoscoped into the Robby the Robot sequence by Ray regular Bret Mixon. Three waves of explosives were planned for the final setpiece but the rigger accidentally detonated one before the cameras were set up, leaving a smaller blast in the final cut, but Ray was still mostly satisfied with it.

== Release ==
=== Pre-release ===
The Phantom Empire was the first project fully directed by Ray for his fledgling American Independent Productions (although the patchwork films Death Farm and Evil Spawn were the company's first releases), but remained in limbo for about two years. It was originally supposed to go to the crumbling Empire Pictures in a three-picture deal that also included two future efforts, but that did not materialize. It was then sold to Film Ventures International, but got stalled again as Ray fought the distributor in court after it defaulted on a final $35,000 payment.

=== Home media ===
The film was eventually released on U.S. VHS on August 17, 1989, by Prism Entertainment. The Prism tape still listed Film Ventures as the program's copyright holder. By that time, it had already been seen in some international markets, including the U.K. where it arrived on a Vestron videotape in late September 1988. The film debuted on domestic DVD on March 19, 2002, from Ventura Distribution. On November 25, 2018, Ray re-issued the film on his Retromedia label, in the form of a 30th Anniversary Edition Blu-ray struck from a new 2K scan.

== Reception ==
The Phantom Empire has received mixed reviews. In trade publication Variety, the reviewer credited as Lor. assessed that the film was "an affectionate nod to old-time lost world sci-fi pics, which should amuse home video fans" and "ingeniously ma[de] up for lack of resources by stressing snappy dialog and in-jokes". In the magazine Space Monsters, a movie-centric spinoff of UFO Universe, Dave Jenkins wrote that "[d]espite the low budget of the film, it moves at a nice pace and for the most part the comedy works." He deemed it to be "[o]ne of Ray’s better films". British magazine Fear concurred, calling it "good camp fun for all, with very little violence". In his syndicated column, Steve Hurst of British publication Video Week called it "another wonderful mish-mash of awfulness from [Ray]" and "[g]reat fun" despite a "rather confused storyline". Another British syndicated columnist, John Brooker, called it "a must for any tacky film festival" with "[w]ooden acting, rickety sets, juvenile script—in fact everything a B-movie fanatic could ask for". John Charles of Video Watchdog assessed that "[f]or all of its abundant flaws, The Phantom Empire still manages to be reasonably enjoyable, primarily for its gleeful incorporation of so many genre clichés and the fun the cast has with the material."

The review committee for Joe Bob Briggs' newsletter The Joe Bob Report voiced a mixed opinion of the film, with a panel member finding that "[i]t's badly made, poorly written, and completely overdone, but just plain funny", while another decried "its meaningless rambling", adding that "[f]ew if any of the scenes have anything discernible to do with whatever precedes them." Mike Mayo, author of VideoHound's Horror Show wrote that the film made Fred Olen Ray's claim of a six-day shoot "easy to believe", while calling the monsters "silly" and the humor "frivolous". Along the same lines, John Stanley, author of the Creature Features series of books, called it "campy. And we're talking master of the camp grounds". He added that Danning "hits an all-time silly high" and Tamblyn was "laughable". In The Dinosaur Filmography, film history Mark F. Berry was unenthusiastic, noting that "[o]n the flip side, Phantom Empire does offer some sharp dialogue delivered by marginally interesting characters", but the "midsection is heavily padded with yawn inducing filler." In The A–Z of Horror Films, British film historian Howard Maxford dismissed it as "dim adventure hokum".
