= Eddie Tamblyn =

American actor

- Born: Edward Francis Tamblyn; January 5, 1908; Yonkers, New York, U.S.
- Died: June 22, 1957 (aged 49); Hollywood, California, U.S.
- Occupation: Actor
- Children: 3, including Russ Tamblyn
- Relatives: Amber Tamblyn (granddaughter)

Edward Francis Tamblyn (January 5, 1908 – June 22, 1957) was an American actor. He was the father of actor Russ Tamblyn and keyboardist Larry Tamblyn (The Standells), and the grandfather of actress Amber Tamblyn.

Born in Yonkers, New York, the son of Edna (née Brown; 1883–1975) and Joseph Tamblyn (1878–1941), he became an actor in the 1930s and made uncredited roles in some movies.

Tamblyn died of a brain tumor at the age of 49 in Hollywood, California on June 22, 1957.

== Selected filmography ==
- The Main Event (1938) (uncredited) – Program Seller
- Mountain Music (1937) (uncredited) – Bellboy
- Star for a Night (1936) (uncredited) – Messenger
- Palm Springs (1936) (off screen credits) – Soda Clerk
- Follow the Fleet (1936) (uncredited) – Sailor
- In Old Kentucky (1935) (uncredited) – Jockey
- It's in the Air (1935) (uncredited) – Jockey
- Dante's Inferno (1935) (uncredited) – Page Boy
- The Daring Young Man (1935) (uncredited) – Office Boy
- A Shot in the Dark (1935) – Bill Smart
- Mrs. Wiggs of the Cabbage Patch (1934) (as Edward Tamblyn) – Usher
- Money Means Nothing (1934) (as Edward Tamblyn) – Robert 'Robby' Ferris
- Hollywood Party (1934) (uncredited) – Bob's Friend
- Harold Teen (1934) – Shadow
- I've Got Your Number (1934) (uncredited) – Messenger
- Flying Down to Rio (1933) (uncredited) – Yankee Clipper
- The Sweetheart of Sigma Chi (1933) – Harry
