= Betsy King Ross =

American actress, anthropologist, and author

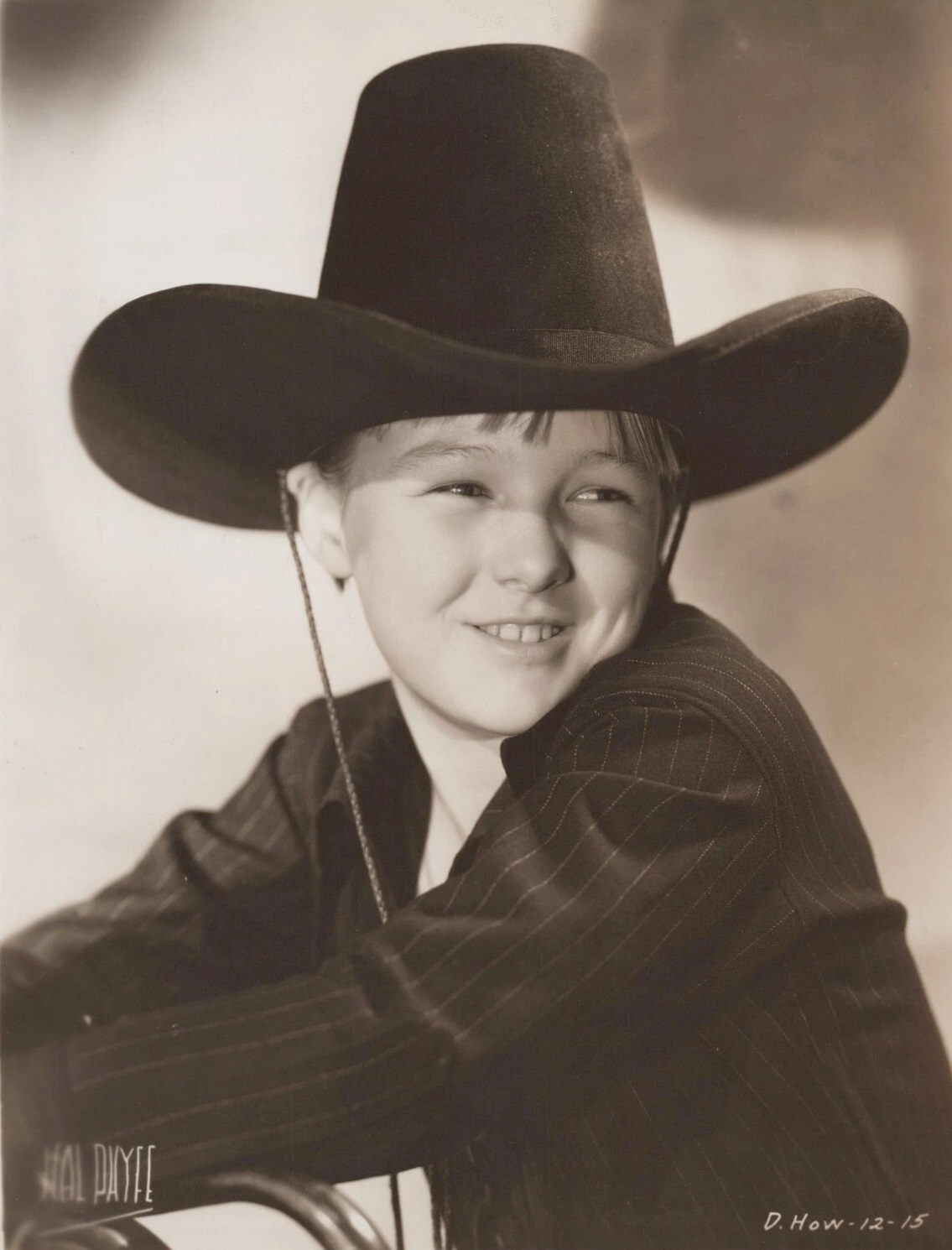
- Ross in Smoke Lightning (1933)
- Born: March 14, 1921; St Paul, Minnesota, U.S.
- Died: October 4, 1989 (aged 68)
- Occupations: Actress, anthropologist and author

Betsy King Ross (March 14, 1921 – October 4, 1989) was an American actress, anthropologist, and author.

She was born in St Paul, Minnesota. During the 1930s, she starred in several Western serial films as a child actress. In 1933, she starred with Johnny Mack Brown and Noah Beery, Jr., in the serial Fighting with Kit Carson. In 1935, she starred with Gene Autry in the serial The Phantom Empire. She was also a champion trick rider.

== Filmography ==
- Men With Steel Faces (1940)
- The Phantom Empire (1935)
- Fighting with Kit Carson (1933)
- Smoke Lightning (1933)
