= Fighting with Kit Carson =

1933 film

- Directed by: Colbert Clark; Armand Schaefer
- Starring: Johnny Mack Brown; Betsy King Ross; Noah Beery, Sr. Noah Beery, Jr. Tully Marshall
- Distributed by: Mascot Pictures
- Release date: 1933
- Running time: 12 chapters (250 minutes)
- Country: United States
- Language: English

Fighting with Kit Carson is a 1933 American pre-Code Mascot Pictures film serial. It was edited into a feature film by Al Dezel Productions in 1946 and released to theaters as a movie. Johnny Mack Brown starred as Kit Carson, and Betsy King Ross played his love interest, Joan Fargo. The film also starred Tully Marshall and both Noah Beery Sr. and Noah Beery Jr.

== Plot ==
Accused with the theft, Kit Carson is trying to solve the mystery of the gold disappearance. To do so he must overcome obstacles set in motion by Kraft, the Mystery Riders, Nakomas, and the young "Johnny" Fargo.

== Cast ==
- Johnny Mack Brown as Kit Carson
- Betsy King Ross as Joan Fargo, aka Johnny Fargo
- Noah Beery, Sr. as Cyrus Kraft
- Noah Beery, Jr. as Nakomas, son of Dark Eagle
- Tully Marshall as Jim Bridge
- Edmund Breese as Matt Fargo
- Al Bridge as Reynolds, a henchman
- Edward Hearn as Morgan, a henchman
- Lafe McKee as Luke Foster
- Jack Mower as Carter, a henchman posing as Johnny's benefactor
- Maston Williams as Chuck, knife-throwing henchman
- Lane Chandler as Army Sergeant

== Chapter titles ==
1. The Mystery Riders
2. The White Chief
3. Hidden Gold
4. The Silent Doom
5. Murder Will Out
6. The Secret of Iron Mountain
7. The Law of the Lawless
8. Red Phantoms
9. The Invisible Enemy
10. Midnight Magic
11. Unmasked
12. The Trail to Glory

_{Source:}

== See also ==
- List of American films of 1933
- List of film serials by year
- List of film serials by studio

Preceded by The Three Musketeers (1933)	Mascot Serial; Fighting with Kit Carson(1933)	Succeeded by The Wolf Dog (1933)
