= Russ Tamblyn =

American actor (born 1934)

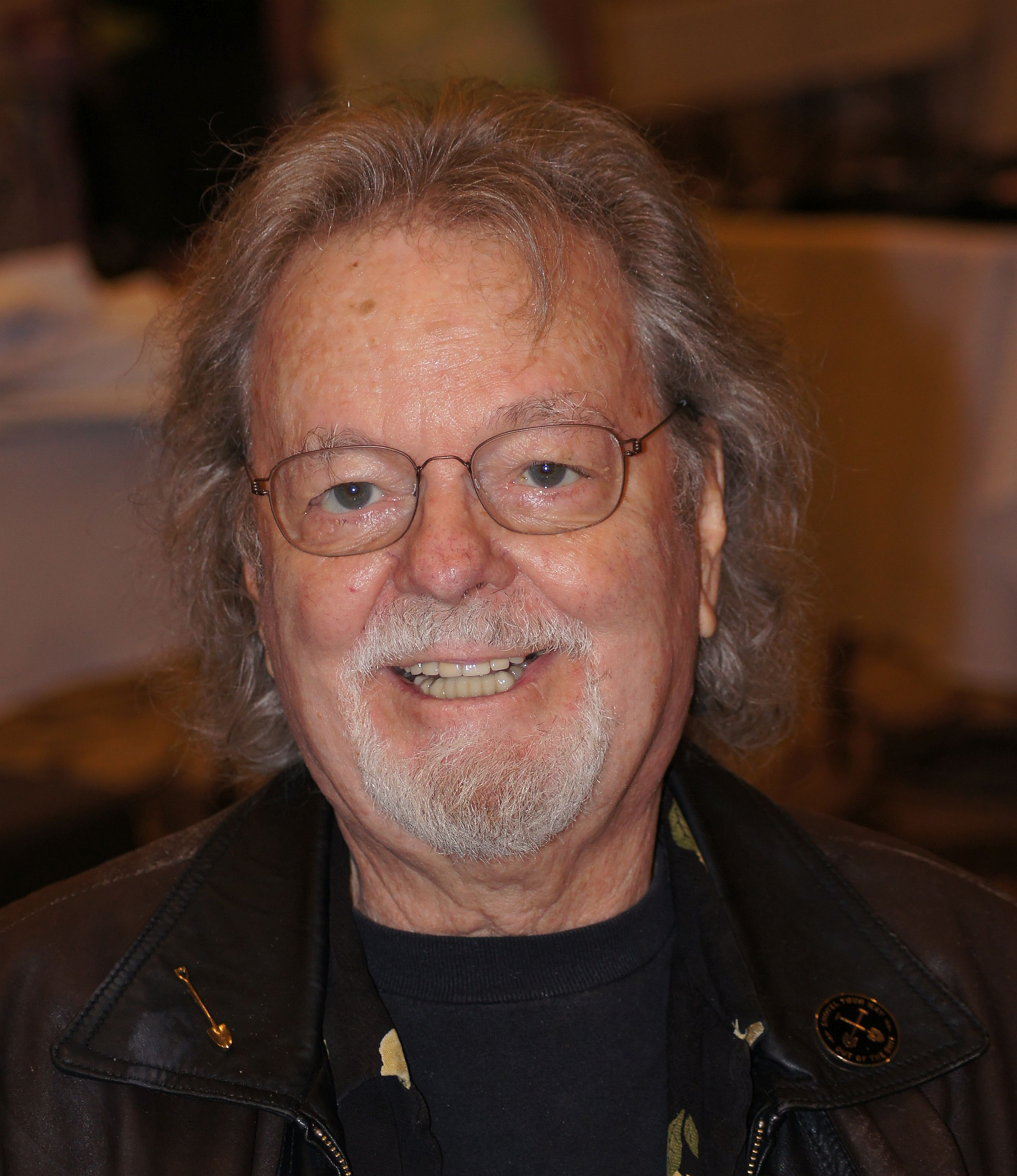
- Tamblyn in 2010
- Born: Russell Irving Tamblyn; December 30, 1934 (age 91); Los Angeles, California, U.S.
- Occupations: Actor; dancer; artist
- Years active: 1948–2018
- Spouses: Venetia Stevenson (m. 1956; div. 1957); Elizabeth Kempton (m. 1960; div. 1979); Bonnie Murray (m. 1981)
- Children: 2, including Amber
- Father: Eddie Tamblyn
- Relatives: David Cross (son-in-law); Larry Tamblyn (brother)
- Website: www.russtamblyn.com

Russell Irving Tamblyn (born December 30, 1934), also known as Rusty Tamblyn, is an American film and television actor and dancer.

Born and raised in Los Angeles, Tamblyn trained as a gymnast in his youth. He began his career as a child actor for Metro-Goldwyn-Mayer. Tamblyn appeared in the musical Seven Brides for Seven Brothers (1954). He subsequently portrayed Norman Page in the drama Peyton Place (1957), for which he earned an Academy Award nomination for Best Supporting Actor. In West Side Story (1961), he portrayed Riff, the leader of the Jets gang.

In the 1970s, Tamblyn appeared in several exploitation films. He worked as a choreographer in the 1980s. In 1990, he starred as Dr. Lawrence Jacoby in David Lynch's television drama Twin Peaks and reprised the role in the show's 2017 revival.

== Early life ==
Tamblyn was born on December 30, 1934, in Los Angeles, California, to actors Sally Aileen (Triplett) and Edward Francis "Eddie" Tamblyn. His younger brother, Larry Tamblyn, was the organist for the 1960s band the Standells.

Tamblyn was a hyperactive child with a penchant for gymnastics and performing. He took the stage during intermissions at the local movie theater and gave tumbling performances. When he was 13, Tamblyn lived in North Hollywood and studied dramatics under Grace Bowman and dancing at the North Hollywood Academy, owned and operated by his parents.

== Career ==
=== 1948–1952: Child acting ===
Tamblyn wanted to be a circus performer and was skilled in acrobatics and dancing as a child. He developed a musical act that involved singing, dancing, juggling, and comedy.

Tamblyn's first professional job came when he was ten years old and was cast by actor Lloyd Bridges in a play Bridges was directing, The Stone Jungle, alongside Dickie Moore. During the play's run Tamblyn was seen by several talent scouts and an agent, who signed him. The agent arranged for Tamblyn to audition for a role in The Boy with Green Hair (1948), and he was given a small part.

Tamblyn appeared as young Saul in Cecil B. DeMille's Samson and Delilah (1949). "That was a big break for me", he later said. "After that I worked a lot."

Tamblyn appeared in Reign of Terror, then was given a role in The Kid from Cleveland (1949)—billed third (as "Rusty Tamblyn") after stars George Brent and Lynn Bari—and in What Happened to Jo Jo? (1950).

Tamblyn played the younger Bart Tare (played as an adult by John Dall) in the film noir Gun Crazy (1950) and Elizabeth Taylor's younger brother in Father of the Bride (also 1950) and its sequel, Father's Little Dividend (1951), at MGM. He appeared in Captain Carey, U.S.A. (1950), The Gangster We Made (1950), As Young as You Feel (1951), Cave of Outlaws (1951), Retreat, Hell! (1952), and The Winning Team (1952).

=== 1953–1962: MGM and leading roles ===
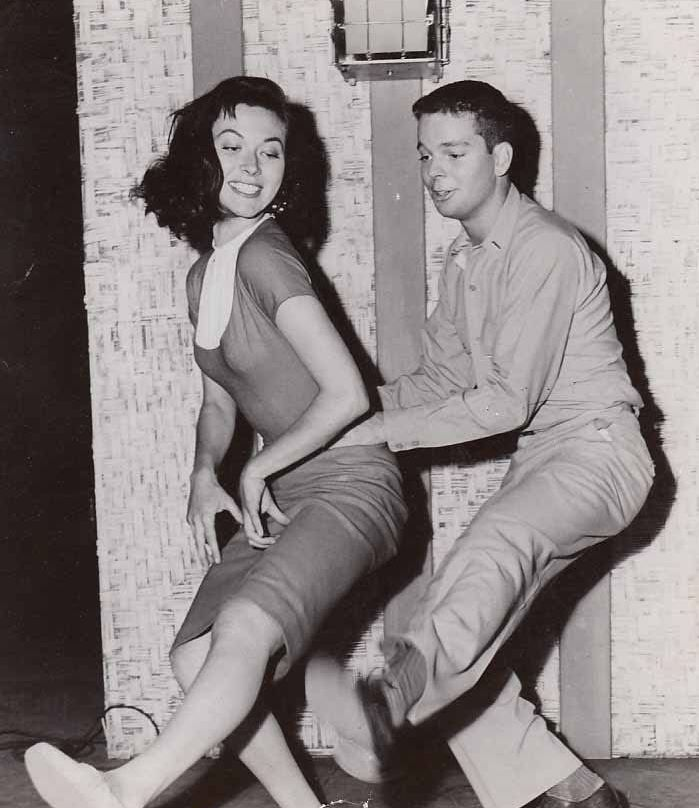
Tamblyn and Gia Scala in Don't Go Near the Water (1957)

MGM was impressed by Tamblyn's performance in Retreat, Hell! and signed him to a long-term contract. He called this "the second big break" of his career.

Tamblyn's first role under the contract was as a young soldier in boot camp in Take the High Ground! (1953), directed by Richard Brooks. His training as a gymnast and abilities as an acrobat prepared him for his breakout role as Gideon, the youngest brother, in Seven Brides for Seven Brothers (1954). Tamblyn has said the director wanted to cast a Broadway dancer but MGM insisted the filmmakers use some contract talent, so he and Jeff Richards were cast.

Tamblyn was not a trained dancer and always considered himself an actor who danced rather than the other way around, but the film was a big success and established him at MGM. He has said his career "really took off" after the film.

Tamblyn was one of many studio contract players in the musical Deep in My Heart (1954). He played Eleanor Parker's brother in the Western Many Rivers to Cross (1955) and was one of several young MGM actors (including Jane Powell and Debbie Reynolds) in the musical Hit the Deck (1955).

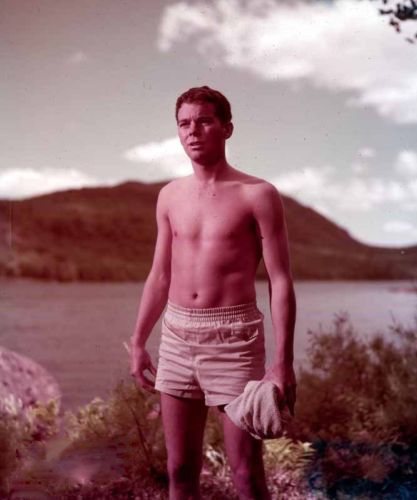
Tamblyn in Peyton Place (1957)

Tamblyn supported older actors in two Westerns: Robert Taylor and Stewart Granger in The Last Hunt (1956), a flop; and Glenn Ford and Broderick Crawford in The Fastest Gun Alive (1956), a big hit in which he performed an extraordinary "shovel" dance at a hoedown. He served (uncredited) as a choreographer for Elvis Presley in 1957's Jailhouse Rock. MGM loaned Tamblyn to Allied Artists for his first star role, The Young Guns (1957). Back at MGM, he supported Glenn Ford and Gia Scala in Don't Go Near the Water (1957), a comedy set among members of the U.S. Navy.

20th Century Fox borrowed Tamblyn to play Norman Page in Peyton Place (1957) opposite Lana Turner and Diane Varsi, a performance for which he was nominated for an Academy Award for Best Supporting Actor. Tamblyn then went to England to play the title role in the musical Tom Thumb (1958), made for George Pal. When he returned, MGM cast him as the lead in High School Confidential (1958), a solid hit.

Tamblyn's career momentum was interrupted when he was drafted into the United States Army in 1958. During his service he was given leave to play a prominent supporting part in Cimarron (1960).

Tamblyn's best-known musical role is as Riff, the leader of the Jets street gang in West Side Story (1961). He then appeared in two MGM Cinerama movies, The Wonderful World of the Brothers Grimm, again for Pal, and How the West Was Won (both 1962).

Tamblyn played Luke Sannerson in The Haunting (1963) for Robert Wise, who had made West Side Story. Tamblyn said he originally turned down the role as he disliked the part but agreed to do it when MGM threatened to put him on suspension. He then played "Smitty" Smith in MGM's Follow the Boys (also 1963).

=== 1963–1976: Television and independent films ===
Tamblyn was unable to consolidate his position as a leading man and later said he "dropped out" after his West Side Story success and devoted himself to art, refusing movie roles, as well as the role of Gilligan in the TV series Gilligan's Island.

In the 1960s he appeared in the TV series The Greatest Show on Earth ("Silent Love, Secret Love", 1963), and Channing ("The Last Testament of Buddy Crown", 1963). Tamblyn played a Viking alongside Richard Widmark and Sidney Poitier in The Long Ships (1965). Also in 1965 he appeared in Burke's Law ("Who Killed Rosie Sunset?") and Days of Our Lives.

Tamblyn had the starring role in the low-budget MGM Western Son of a Gunfighter (1965) and starred in the 1966 Japanese kaiju film War of the Gargantuas. He guest starred on Tarzan ("Leopard on the Loose", 1966), and Iron Horse ("Decision at Sundown", 1967). Tamblyn later said he became "bored" with acting around this time and more interested in art.

Tamblyn starred in the notorious biker movie Satan's Sadists (1969) for Al Adamson. He followed it with Scream Free! (1969), The Last Movie (1971), The Female Bunch (1971), and Dracula vs. Frankenstein (1971) for Adamson.

He appeared on TV in Cade's County ("Ragged Edge", 1972), Win, Place or Steal (1973), The World Through the Eyes of Children (1975), The Quest ("The Captive", 1976), The Life and Times of Grizzly Adams ("The Skyrider", 1978), and Nero Wolfe ("Before I Die", 1981). He was also in Black Heat (1976).

At the same time he worked in exploitation, Tamblyn also worked in the construction industry and computer software.

=== 1978–1989: Choreography and film ===
Tamblyn played the supporting role in Neil Young's 1982 Human Highway and is also credited for screenplay and choreography. He is credited as director, choreographer, and actor for Young's Greendale concert tour. He choreographed a play, Man with Bags, in 1983.

Tamblyn appeared in the TV series Fame, Commando Squad (1987) for Fred Olen Ray, The Phantom Empire (1988), Necromancer (1988), B.O.R.N. (1988), The Bloody Monks (1988), and an episode of Quantum Leap. He was in Aftershock (1990) and Wizards of the Demon Sword (1991) for Fred Olen Ray.

=== 1990–2004: Twin Peaks and other work ===
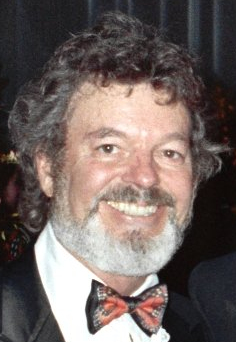
Tamblyn at the 1990 Annual Primetime Emmy Awards

In 1990–91, Tamblyn starred as Dr. Lawrence Jacoby on the David Lynch-created series Twin Peaks (alongside his West Side Story co-star Richard Beymer, who played Ben Horne); his scenes in the 1992 prequel film Twin Peaks: Fire Walk with Me were cut.

He appeared in Running Mates (1992), Little Devils: The Birth (1993), Cabin Boy (1994), Desert Steel (1994), and Babylon 5. He appeared on stage in Los Angeles in Zastrozzi. His work drifted back to straight to video: Starstruck (1995), Rebellious (1995), Attack of the 60 Foot Centerfold (1995) and Invisible Mom (1996) for Fred Olen Ray, Johnny Mysto: Boy Wizard (1997), My Ghost Dog (1997), and Little Miss Magic (1998) for Ray.

In 1997 and 2000, Tamblyn appeared on the soap opera General Hospital alongside his daughter Amber. In 2004, he appeared with Amber again, playing God in the form of a man walking dogs, in three episodes of Joan of Arcadia. The two also worked together on the films Rebellious and Johnny Mysto: Boy Wizard and the TV series The Increasingly Poor Decisions of Todd Margaret. In Quentin Tarantino's film Django Unchained, they were billed respectively as "Son of a Gunfighter" and "Daughter of a Son of a Gunfighter", alluding to Tamblyn's leading role in Son of a Gunfighter.

In 2004, the Academy Film Archive preserved Tamblyn's mid-1960s works First Film and Rio Reel.

=== 2005–present: Later roles ===
Tamblyn had supporting roles in Drive (2011), Django Unchained (2012), and Hits (2014). He appeared several times in The Increasingly Poor Decisions of Todd Margaret and in the revival of Twin Peaks (2017).

== Personal life ==
Tamblyn married actress Venetia Stevenson in 1956, but they divorced the next year. In 1960, he married Elizabeth Kempton, a showgirl, in Las Vegas. In later years, Tamblyn discovered he had a daughter from a 1960s relationship with artist and spiritual practitioner Elizabeth Anne Vigil. That daughter, China Faye Tamblyn, is an artist and heavy metal welder who lives in California. Tamblyn did not meet her until she was a teenager, and only after the birth of his second child, actress and author Amber Tamblyn, who was born in 1983 to his third wife, Bonnie Murray.

In 2012, it was announced that Tamblyn was working on an autobiography, Dancing On The Edge. The book was released in 2024.

Tamblyn underwent open heart surgery in October 2014. There were complications afterward and during his rehabilitation, but his health had reportedly improved by February 2015.

== Filmography ==
=== Film ===
Year	Title	Role	Notes
1948	The Boy with Green Hair	Classmate	Uncredited
1949	Reign of Terror	Pierre's Oldest Son	Uncredited
1949	The Kid from Cleveland	Johnny Barrows	Credited as Rusty Tamblyn
1949	Samson and Delilah	Saul	
1950	Gun Crazy	Bart Tare at 14	Credited as Rusty Tamblyn
1950	Captain Carey, U.S.A.	Pietro	Credited as Rusty Tamblyn
1950	The Vicious Years	Tino	
1950	Father of the Bride	Tommy Banks	Credited as Rusty Tamblyn
1951	Father's Little Dividend	Tommy Banks	
1951	As Young as You Feel	Willie McKinley	Credited as Rusty Tamblyn
1951	Cave of Outlaws	Young Peter	Uncredited
1952	Retreat, Hell!	Private	
1952	The Winning Team	Willie Alexander	Credited as Rusty Tamblyn
1953	Take the High Ground!	Paul Jamison	
1954	Seven Brides for Seven Brothers	Gideon Pontipee	
1954	Deep in My Heart	Lazar Berrison, Jr.	Uncredited
1955	Many Rivers to Cross	Shields	
1955	Hit the Deck	Danny Xavier Smith	
1956	The Last Hunt	Jimmy	
1956	The Fastest Gun Alive	Eric Doolittle	
1956	The Young Guns	Tully Rice	
1957	Don't Go Near the Water	Ensign Tyson	
1957	Peyton Place	Norman Page	
1958	High School Confidential!	Tony Baker/Mike Wilson	
1958	Tom Thumb	Tom Thumb	
1960	Cimarron	The Cherokee Kid	
1961	West Side Story	Riff	
1962	The Wonderful World of the Brothers Grimm	The Woodsman ('The Dancing Princess') / Tom Thumb	
1962	How the West Was Won	Confederate deserter	
1963	Follow the Boys	Lt (JG) "Smitty" Smith	
1963	The Haunting	Luke Sannerson	
1964	The Long Ships	Orm	
1965	Son of a Gunfighter	Johnny Ketchum	
1966	War of the Gargantuas	Dr. Paul Stewart	
1967	The Cool Ones	Whiz-Bam Dancer	Uncredited
1969	Satan's Sadists	Anchor	
1969	Scream Free!	Link	
1971	Dracula vs. Frankenstein	Rico	
1971	The Female Bunch	Bill	
1971	The Last Movie	Member of Billy's Gang	
1974	Win, Place or Steal	Raymond	
1975	The World Through the Eyes of Children	Devil	
1976	Black Heat	Ziggy	
1982	Neil Young: Human Highway	Fred Kelly	Also writer and choreographer
1985	The Fantasy Film Worlds of George Pal	Himself	Documentary
1987	Commando Squad	Anchor	
1988	Necromancer	Charles DeLonge	
1988	B.O.R.N.	Hugh	
1988	The Phantom Empire	Bill	Direct-to-DVD
1989	The Bloody Monks	Frank	
1990	Aftershock	Hank Franklin	
1991	Wizards of the Demon Sword	Ulric	
1992	Twin Peaks: Fire Walk with Me	Dr. Lawrence Jacoby	Scenes deleted
1993	Little Devils: The Birth	Doc Clapton	
1994	Cabin Boy	Chocki	
1994	Desert Steel	Tate	
1995	Starstruck	Wheeler	
1995	Rebellious	Old Guy	
1995	Attack of the 60 Foot Centerfold	Gas Attendant	
1996	Invisible Mom	Dr. Woorter	Direct-to-DVD
1997	Johnny Mysto: Boy Wizard	Blackmoor	Direct-to-DVD
1998	Little Miss Magic	Brenden Moran	
2000	Special Envoys		
2002	Cinerama Adventure	Himself	Documentary
2011	Drive	Doc	
2012	Django Unchained	Son of a Gunfighter	
2014	Hits	Russ	
2015	Chatty Cattie	Bruce	
2016	Paint It Black	Meredith's Friend	

=== Television ===
Year	Title	Role	Notes
1963	The Greatest Show on Earth	Tom Tuttle	Episode: "Silent Love, Secret Love"
1963	Channing	Hal Langley	Episode: "The Last Testament of Buddy Crown"
1965	Burke's Law	Maximillian	Episode: "Who Killed Rosie Sunset?"
1965	Gunsmoke	Billy Waters	Episode: "He Who Steals"
1966	Tarzan	Bell	Episode: "Leopard on the Loose"
1967	Iron Horse	Kehoe	Episode: "Decision at Sundown"
1969	The Name of the Game	John Earl	Episode: "A Hard Case of the Blues"
1972	Cade's County	Brewster	Episode: "Ragged Edge"
1976	The Quest	Kelly	Episode: "The Captive"
1978	The Life and Times of Grizzly Adams	Milton Wright	Episode: "The Skyrider"
1981	Nero Wolfe	Police Detective	Episode: "Before I Die"
1986–1987	Fame	Russ / Michael Taftner	3 episodes
1987	Rags to Riches	Roger	Episode: "Vegas Rock"
1989	Quantum Leap	Bert Glasserman	Episode: "Thou Shalt Not..."
1990–1991	Twin Peaks	Dr. Lawrence Jacoby	15 episodes
1992	Running Mates	Frank Usher	Television film
1994	Babylon 5	Capt. Jack Maynard	Episode: "A Distant Star"
1997	Nash Bridges	Jim the Penman	Episode: "The Counterfeiters"
1997	General Hospital	Nurses ball dancer	1 episode
1998	My Ghost Dog	Vito	Television film
1999	Inherit the Wind	Ed Morse	Television film
2000	General Hospital	Dr. Rose	2 episodes
2004	Joan of Arcadia	Dog Walker God	3 episodes
2010–2012; 2016	The Increasingly Poor Decisions of Todd Margaret	Chuck Margaret / Billy the Cheesegrater	9 episodes
2017	Twin Peaks	Dr. Lawrence Jacoby	6 episodes
2018	The Haunting of Hill House	Dr. Montague	Episode: "The Bent-Neck Lady"

== Awards and nominations ==
Awards and nominations
Award	Category	Year	Title of work	Result
Academy Award	Best Actor in a Supporting Role	1957	Peyton Place	Nominated
Golden Globe Award	Most Promising Newcomer - Male	1956	Hit the Deck	Won (shared with Ray Danton)
Golden Laurel Award	Top Male Musical Performance	1959	Tom Thumb	Nominated

== Works cited ==
- Cullen, Frank; Hackman, Florence; McNeilly, Donald (2006). Vaudeville Old & New: An Encyclopedia of Variety Performances in America. Psychology Press. ISBN 978-0-415-93853-2.
- Lamparski, Richard (1985). Whatever Became Of ... ? (9th ed.). Crown. ISBN 978-0-517-55540-8.
- Willis, John; Monush, Barry, eds. (2010). Screen World 2007. Vol. 58. Hal Leonard Corporation. ISBN 978-1-557-83729-5.
- Williams, Sharon Lind (June–July 1991). "Russ Tamblyn". Filmfax. No. 27. p. 68.
