= Exploitica =

- Genre: Comedy
- Written by: Nathan Cockerill; Paul Simper
- Country of origin: United Kingdom
- Original language: English
- No. of series: 2
- No. of episodes: 35

Production
- Executive producers: Stephen Carsey; Tom Gutteridge
- Producer: Kalbir Dhillon
- Running time: Series 1 - 25 minutes Series 2 - 50 minutes
- Production company: TV21

Original release
- Network: Channel 4
- Release: 1998 – 2000

Exploitica (styled as Exploitica Rides Again for series 2) is a late-night comedy show in the UK that aired on Channel 4, shown on Friday nights as part of the 4Later slot. Created by TV21, the show ran for two seasons from 1999 to 2000.

== Format ==
Unlike normal comedy shows, each series uses doctored clips from exploitation movies, B-movies, movie serials and American educational reels from the 1930s up until the mid-1980s, using superimposed thought-balloons, subtitles and sound effects for comedic effect. Notable films lampooned by the show included the 1935 Gene Autry serial The Phantom Empire and the 1962 Richard Kiel B-movie Eegah!.

== Airing ==
Series 1 consisted of 12 episodes of a runtime of 25 minutes each and aired in December 1998. Three further episodes of series 1 were billed as Exploitica presents: Exploitease. These episodes included Alice in AcidLand, Guess What Happened To Count Dracula? and Trailer Park. Series 2 was commissioned by Channel 4 for broadcast in 2000 and consisted of twenty 50 minute episodes, with ten episodes airing in early 2000 and the remaining episodes airing in late 2000.

The program occupied the midnight slot on the Channel 4 Friday night 4Later schedule of programming.

From series 2 onwards, the program was billed as Exploitica Rides Again, but the on-screen title remained Exploitica.

== See also ==
outTHERE, a show featuring clips from various non-mainstream films, videos and television programmes.
