= Son of a Gunfighter =

1965 film by Paul Landres

- Directed by: Paul Landres
- Written by: Clarke Reynolds
- Produced by: Lester Welch
- Starring: Russ Tamblyn; Kieron Moore
- Cinematography: Manuel Berenguer
- Music by: Robert Mellin
- Production company: Metro-Goldwyn-Mayer
- Release dates: 1965 (Spanish); May 1966 (United States)
- Running time: 91 minutes
- Countries: Spain; United States
- Language: English

Son of a Gunfighter (Spanish: El Hijo del Pistolero) is a 1965 Spanish-American Western film directed by Paul Landres. It was the last MGM film to be shot in CinemaScope.

Russ Tamblyn was cast as "Son of a Gunfighter" in Quentin Tarantino's Django Unchained as a homage to this film.

== Plot ==
Along the Mexican–American border, outlaws rob a bank then attack a stagecoach and find themselves defeated with the help of an ace gunman who seems to be looking for the group leader. After being injured in a shoot-out with bandidos, the young man continues his quest, aided by the Mexican rancher the bandits were trying to rob.

== Cast ==
- Russ Tamblyn as Johnny Ketchum
- Kieron Moore as Deputy Mace Fenton
- James Philbrook as James 'Ace' Ketchum
- Fernando Rey as Don Pedro Fortuna
- María Granada as Pilar Fortuna, Don Pedro's Daughter
- Aldo Sambrell as Juan Morales, Bandit Chief
- Antonio Casas as Pecos, Ace's Lieutenant
- Barta Barri as Esteban, Don Pedro's Major Domo
- Ralph Browne as Sheriff Litton

== See also ==
- List of American films of 1965
