= Smoke Lightning =

1933 film

- Theatrical release poster
- Directed by: David Howard
- Screenplay by: Sidney D. Mitchell; Gordon Rigby; Harry Ruskin
- Starring: George O'Brien; Nell O'Day; Betsy King Ross; Frank Atkinson; Clarence Wilson; Morgan Wallace
- Cinematography: Sidney Wagner
- Edited by: Jack Murray
- Music by: Peter Brunelli; Arthur Lange
- Production company: Fox Film Corporation
- Distributed by: Fox Film Corporation
- Release date: February 17, 1933
- Running time: 63 minutes
- Country: United States
- Language: English

Smoke Lightning is a 1933 American pre-Code Western film directed by David Howard and written by Sidney D. Mitchell and Gordon Rigby. The film stars George O'Brien, Nell O'Day, Betsy King Ross, Frank Atkinson, Clarence Wilson, and Morgan Wallace. It is based on the story "Cañon Walls" by Zane Grey. The film was released on February 17, 1933, by Fox Film Corporation.

== Plot ==
Blake commits suicide after Smoke wins the Blake ranch in a poker game, and Smoke transfers the ranch to Blake's little daughter. The sheriff, though, is after the ranch and has Smoke arrested for the murder of Blake, before bringing in a fake relative to appear as the girl's relative.

== Cast ==
- George O'Brien as Smoke Mason
- Nell O'Day as Dorothy Benson
- Betsy King Ross as Betsy Blake
- Frank Atkinson as Alf Bailey
- Clarence Wilson as Deputy Jake Tully
- Morgan Wallace as Sheriff Archie Kyle
- Virginia Sale as Housekeeper Sawyer
- E. Alyn Warren as Carter Blake
- Douglass Dumbrille as Sam Edson
- Richard Carle as Parson
