= Commando Squad =

1987 film directed by Fred Olen Ray

- Directed by: Fred Olen Ray
- Written by: Michael Sonye
- Produced by: Alan Amiel
- Starring: Kathy Shower; Brian Thompson; William Smith; Robert Quarry; Sid Haig
- Cinematography: Gary Graver
- Edited by: Kimberly Domínguez
- Music by: David A. Jackson; Steve LeGassick; Tony Riparetti; James Saad
- Production company: Trans World Entertainment
- Distributed by: Trans World Entertainment (U.S.)
- Release date: June 5, 1987
- Running time: 91 minutes
- Country: United States
- Language: English
- Budget: $750,000

Commando Squad is a 1987 American action film directed by Fred Olen Ray, starring Kathy Shower, Brian Thompson and William Smith. Shower stars as a tough U.S. cop who travels to Mexico to help her ex-boyfriend and fellow crime fighter, who has run afoul of a drug cartel led by a disgraced colleague.

== Plot ==
Two undercover narcotics agents pose as drug buyers to frame a gang located in the gulf of Texas, but are unmasked. One of them is killed. The other, Clint Jensen, is badly wounded. He is now hunted down by Morgan, the leader of the gang and a former DEA agent who betrayed the force to take control of the drug racket he had been sent to take down. Jensen sends a desperate message to his ex-girlfriend and former partner Kat Withers, herself one of the CIA's leading operatives in the war on drugs.

The agency fears further casualties and balks at Kat's rescue mission, but eventually agrees to provide her with equipment, including an experimental knife equipped with an acid-soaked blade, which she vows to keep for Morgan. Soon after she arrives in the area of operations, Withers is attacked by the cartel. She escapes and heads for the local town to look for clues about Morgan and Jensen's whereabouts. There, she discovers that the entire place is controlled by Morgan's men.

== Cast ==
- Kathy Shower as Kat Withers
- Brian Thompson as Clint Jensen
- William Smith as Morgan Denny
- Robert Quarry as Milo
- Sid Haig as Iggy
- Mel Welles as Quintano
- Marie Windsor as Casey
- Benita Martinez (credited as Benita Andre) as Anita
- Dawn Wildsmith as Consuela
- Ross Hagen as Cowboy
- Tané McClure as Sunny
- Russ Tamblyn as Anchor

== Production ==
=== Development and casting ===
An early incarnation of the film, written and to be directed by Herb Freed, was in the works at Trans World Entertainment circa 1984, with Mike Norris in the lead, in the first of a two-picture deal with Trans World. In 1985, the project was retooled as a girls with guns film starring Sybil Danning and Israeli actress Anat Atzmon, with Fred Olen Ray now attached to direct. Danning's role entailed just six days of filming, for which she stood to make $25,000. According to Ray, he was booked for the project after Trans World officers saw an artwork in his office and offered him to direct something along the same lines. Although he found the subject matter generic, he was offered twice what he had made for his previous employer CineTel, with whom his relationship was crumbling fast. The Danning-led Commando Squad was slated to start filming in January 1986.

However, the film was delayed and went through more rewrites. Concurrently, Danning was replaced by recently anointed Playmate of the Year Kathy Shower, in her first feature starring role. Danning threatened a $1.5 million lawsuit against TWE, alleging that they had only hired her to raise international financing before dropping her. TWE boss Moshe Diamant countered that he had offered Danning other parts in the film, but she had turned them down. In a retrospective interview, Ray commented that he would rather have done the film with her. Although Norris' name was absent from the promotional poster of the Danning-led reboot, he maintained that he would start filming Commando Squad in July 1986. However, the male lead instead went to Brian Thompson, who was coming off supporting role in TWE's Catch the Heat, and claimed to have been offered a five-picture deal by the company. Meanwhile, Norris moved on to Survival Game, another TWE production directed by Freed.

Dawn Wildsmith, who appears as Consuela, became Ray's wife one week before filming. Although Tané McClure's manager husband had placed one of her songs in Ray's earlier film Armed Response, her casting in Commando Squad did not stem from that and she just showed up for the audition on her own. Ray, who always enjoyed hiring old Hollywood stars, cast Marie Windsor in what turned out to be her final role. Russ Tamblyn's character "Anchor" was a tribute to his role in Satan's Sadists. In August 1986, the trade press announced the start of photography, but Ray was directing Cyclone at that time.

=== Filming ===
Filming actually took place in November 1986 at a budget of $750,000. This marked the first collaboration between Ray and his frequent cinematographer Gary Graver. Graver had been recommended three years prior by fellow producer George Edwards, with whom Ray shared an office, but until then, he had never had a backer who would afford Graver's rate. Lucky Brown's MovieTech studios in Van Nuys were used for interior sets. Mexican landscapes were represented by several Los Angeles area locations frequently employed by the movie industry, such as Agoura's Paramount Ranch and Bronson Canyon.

The script called for a number of night scenes, but nobody wanted to work late. Ray opted for earlier call times, which allowed him to finish day scenes in advance and shoot the night scenes in the second part of the afternoon, as the canyon got dark before true sunset. The cartel camp was erected especially for the movie by set building company Tom Stasinis Productions. It was entirely destroyed for the climax, which was shot over three days. A stunt went wrong when one of the vehicles veered off course and started rolling down towards a parking lot, forcing one of the stuntmen to overtake it and block the road with his own car. Photography lasted 19 days and wrapped up on November 21, beating its deadline.

== Release ==
=== Pre-release ===
According to December 1986 interview with Thompson, a title change to Line of Fire was considered.

=== Theatrical ===
Commando Squad opened on the East Coast and in the Midwest U.S. on June 5, 1987, in a self distributed release. In L.A., where it debuted on June 12, the film was shown in a double bill with another TWE film Catch the Heat, although according to Ray, the latter was pulled after one week and Commando Squad continued for eight.

=== Home video ===
The film arrived on domestic VHS and Betamax through Trans World Entertainment on August 13, 1988.

== Reception ==
Commando Squad has received negative reviews from critics. Michael Wilmington of the Los Angeles Times conceded that "[c]inematographer Gary Graver gets some nice shots and director Fred Olen Ray gets in cynical humor and a few interesting villains". However, he deemed that "the material is too foolish and sordid to sustain any kind of offbeat juicing-up". Sister publications The Motion Picture Annual and TV Guide wrote that "[a]fter a nicely constructed beginning, the film slows to a crawl until the final shootout, which is indistinguishable from a hundred scenes in a hundred movies just like it." Writing for trade publication Variety, the reviewer credited as Lor. wrote that "Fred Olen Ray operates on auto-pilot in this deadly dull picture that tries to be a destitute man's Extreme Prejudice, predicting that the picture's outlook was "not good".
