= Marvin (comic strip) =

American comic strip by Tom Armstrong

- Author: Tom Armstrong
- Website: http://comicskingdom.com/marvin
- Current status/schedule: Running
- Launch date: August 1, 1982; 43 years ago
- Alternate name(s): Marvin & Bitsy, Marvin & Family, Marvin & Staff
- Syndicate(s): (current) King Features Syndicate (1986–present) (past) News America Syndicate (1984–1986); Field Newspaper Syndicate (1982–1984)
- Genre: Humor

Marvin, later called Marvin & Family (and Marvin and Staff on Sundays in October 2020), is a daily newspaper comic strip created by cartoonist Tom Armstrong and distributed in the U.S. by Hearst's King Features Syndicate. Debuting in 1982, it revolves around the life and times of a young baby boy named Marvin, along with his parents, Jeff and Jenny Miller, and their dog Bitsy. In 1989, CBS aired a special, "Marvin, Baby of the Year."

== Publication history ==
Cartoonist Tom Armstrong debuted the seven-days-weekly comic strip Marvin on Sunday, August 1, 1982. Originally distributed by North America Syndicate, it later went through Hearst's King Features Syndicate. (There was an earlier strip named Marvin, which was created by Pat Moran and syndicated in 1973.) The strip revolves around the life and times of a young baby boy named Marvin, along with his parents, Jeff and Jenny Miller, and their dog Bitsy.

On March 10, 1989, CBS aired a half-hour animated special, Marvin, Baby of the Year. It has never been released on home video.

The location is not explicitly defined. In 2012, in honor of the strip's 30th anniversary, it spoofed Back to the Future where baby Marvin meets himself as a full-grown man. The 30-something Marvin tells his baby self what awaits for him.

A few flashback episodes showed Marvin as an unborn fetus, in imitation of Eggbert, a strip by LAF.

=== Recurring characters ===
Other major characters include Megan, Marvin's cousin; Janet, who is Megan's mother and Jenny's sister; Ming Ming, Janet's adopted daughter from China; Bea and Roy, Marvin's maternal grandparents; and Doris, Marvin's paternal grandmother. Megan's father has not been seen (the strip indicates Megan's parents are divorced). Minor characters have included Bea and Roy's toy schnauzer named Junior; Roy's friend Bernie; and Marvin's friends Jordan, Warren (who is a genius, with a 174 IQ), Kyle, Gerald Rosie and Will, a child prodigy who spelled "prodigy" at five months. Jeff has a macho friend, Ted who in June 2024 dated Janet. Jordan has a girlfriend Shillina. Marvin's goldfish are Finn and Gill. As of 2022 Jordan has a baby sister Lici. Marvin's paternal grandfather has a cat named Clawfull. As of 2024 Marvin has a classmate named Wayne Johnson who can lift heavy things.

Prior to 2013 the strip's name was simply Marvin.

== Milestone events ==
In July 2003, a series of strips had Marvin finally learning how to walk, which culminated in a Sunday strip where he officially celebrated his first birthday.

Bea and Roy Arnold lost their retirement savings in the 2008 recession and had to move in with Jeff and Jenny; Janet did not have enough room. As of 2021 the grandparents are no longer living with the family.

In 2010, the Millers got new neighbors, the Purfects, who are so perfect they make the Millers feel inadequate. Rodney Purfect has a PhD and is a company president, has won the Heisman Trophy and climbed Mount Kilimanjaro. He is six feet five inches tall and very manly. Barbie Purfect is a blonde housewife who attended cooking school in Paris, was a cheerleader, class president and sorority president. Rodney Purfect II is two and a half years old but reads at a third grade level, performed his piano composition for Queen Elizabeth II and was potty trained at 6 months. He also has blond hair.

In 2005, Marvin guest starred in the comic strip Blondie for its 75th anniversary.

In 2019, Jeff's mother was kicked out of her retirement home and moved in with the family.
