= Crankshaft (comic strip) =

American comic strip by Tom Batiuk

- Author: Tom Batiuk
- Illustrator(s): Chuck Ayers (1987–2017); Dan Davis (2017–present)
- Current status/schedule: Running daily & Sunday strip
- Launch date: June 8, 1987; 39 years ago
- Syndicate(s): King Features Syndicate (1987–2023); Andrews McMeel Syndication (2023–)

Crankshaft is a comic strip that was initially centered around a character by the same name — an older, curmudgeonly school bus driver —which debuted on June 8, 1987. Written by Tom Batiuk and drawn by Dan Davis, Crankshaft is a spin-off from Batiuk's comic strip Funky Winkerbean. Prior to April 2, 2017, the strip was drawn by Chuck Ayers, whose repurposed art from these earlier strips is still often seen in the feature's current run.

Since Funky Winkerbean ended in 2022, Crankshaft has incorporated many of the characters and storylines from Funky Winkerbean into the strip -- to the point that Crankshaft himself will now sometimes not appear in his own strip for weeks at a time.

== Characters and setting ==
Although the strip has changed focus since 2022, for the bulk of the strip's run, the major characters included:

- Ed (Edward Roger Dale) Crankshaft Sr. is a widower with two daughters and a son (Ed Jr.) who died as an infant. Crankshaft is a World War II veteran who, in his youth, was an aspiring baseball player who never made it to the major leagues (he played for the Toledo Mud Hens at his highest level) due to the conniving of another team member. He drives a school bus for a living and is part of the transportation department's bowling team (though he is not a great bowler). He often acts irritable, angry, upset or grumpy to cover up the fact that he actually does have a soft, sweet side.
- Pam Murdoch, Crankshaft's daughter, is a major fixture and is married to Jeff and has two children.
- Max and Mindy Murdoch are the children of Pam and Jeff and Ed's grandchildren.
- Christine, Crankshaft's other daughter, lives in New York City and only occasionally appears in the strips.
- Rocky and Bill are bus drivers who are Crankshaft's co-workers.
- Lillian and Lucy McKenzie, neighbors to Crankshaft, are two elderly sisters who share a house (Lucy has since died, in March 2009).
- Morgan and Chase Lambert are a young couple who also live in the neighborhood. For a long time, Chase and Morgan were well-off, upper-middle class, thanks to Chase's well-paying job at a financial firm. Many strips would feature Chase flaunting his wealth and one-upping Crankshaft. Due to the Recession, Chase was laid off from his job in February 2010.
- Ralph Meckler is Crankshaft's best friend and is married to Helen. He is currently running for Mayor of Centerville.
- Lena is the manager of the bus garage where Crankshaft works. She is known for her undrinkable coffee and inedible baked cookies and brownies.
- Mrs. Thornton was Lena's predecessor as manager of the bus garage. She and Crankshaft had a strong dislike of each other, such that she tried to make him quit (by doing things like taking away his beloved bus #13 and assigning him to bus #0, the most run-down one in the fleet, and also assigning him to the Roughriders' route), but she was fired instead.
- Andy Clark and Rocky Rhodes are two of Crankshaft's co-workers. Andy is a middle-aged black man and habitually wears a green cap, while Rocky is a young white man and has a goatee.
- Lois is Crankshaft's girlfriend.
- Grandma Johnson is the guardian of one of kids Crankshaft drives and becomes known as the only one able to catch Crankshaft's bus, leading to the two building an adversarial rivalry.
- The Roughriders were the toughest, most difficult kids in the Teddy Roosevelt High School district and frequent passengers on Crankshaft's bus. They are:

- Angel, the lone female of the group and eventually a single mother.
- Marcus, the lone Black member of the group.
- Shane, the leader of the group, and he is never seen without his shades and backwards baseball cap.
- Cobey
- Severo, the tallest member of the group and who always wore his hair in a Mohawk ponytail.

Crankshaft is known for recurring running gags, such as:

- all the bus drivers insulting the cooking efforts (especially the brownies and coffee) of Lena, a co-worker. Lena serves as the drivers' supervisor.
- Crankshaft constantly trying to outrun kids (and their mothers) who miss the bus. His reputation has become such that students can use "my bus driver is Crankshaft" as a valid excuse for being late to school.
  - Additionally, Crankshaft will also drive his bus so slowly that long lines of cars end up trailing him (on one occasion, a police officer gives him a citation for having an "unlicensed parade" because so many cars are behind him). This actually led to the death of Pop Clutch, another bus driver, who was prevented from getting to a hospital by a Crankshaft traffic jam; Crankshaft himself seems blithely unbothered by this.
- Crankshaft's coming up with different labor-saving gadgets (which often don't work or cause more damage)
- pouring too much lighter fluid on the grill, causing it to explode whenever the grill is lit.
  - As a result, the family enjoys a friendly relationship with the Centerville Fire Department. Pam has even installed a camera pointed at Crankshaft's fireplace so the fire department can know when Crankshaft's going to have a pending chimney fire.
  - In a 2018 story, Crankshaft's grill gets launched into outer space, and in a May 2023 storyline, it is revealed the launched grill hit the diverted asteroid Dimorphos, which ends up altering its course again to where the asteroid is projected to strike Earth. Crankshaft is nearly charged with "Eventual Destruction of the Earth" because of this, until the charges are dropped because the asteroid won't strike Earth for another 10,000 years, which would be past the statute of limitations for the charges against Crankshaft.
- Crankshaft's bus backing over neighbor George Keesterman's mailbox while turning around in the cul-de-sac at the end of his route (although some strips have George Keesterman saving his mail box in time).
- Crankshaft enjoys wild mushrooms, picks 'edible' ones and gives them to his daughter Pam to prepare. Pam always presumes they are poisonous, tosses them out and substitutes store-bought mushrooms. Ed doesn't notice the switch.
- Crankshaft blowing out his back and being laid up and not caring for it (the strip often attempts to find gallows humor in somewhat depressing situations)
- Flashbacks which include, but are not limited to, Crankshaft's days as a baseball player. Some flashbacks indicate that Crankshaft played professionally in the late 1930s and the early 1940s, which would make the character well over 100 years old today; this continuity error has been largely ignored within the framework of the strip.
- Crankshaft is heavily involved with the Centerville Garden Club in which the strip includes him speaking to other club members which mostly include ladies and also includes Lillian.

== Continuity ==
The continuity of Crankshaft was as much as twenty years behind that of Funky Winkerbean at one point; strips in both comics in August and September 2011 show a character in the latter strip, a high school teacher with a daughter of her own, as a college-age student in the former. Crankshaft himself appeared on a couple of occasions in mid-2010s Funky Winkerbean as a much older, wheelchair-using near-comatose husk. More recently, Batiuk appears to have retconned this time disparity (and the older Crankshaft) out of existence.

Batiuk has attempted to tackle many serious issues in the strip, including:

- Adult literacy: When Crankshaft revealed to his family that he could not read, the strip followed his efforts to learn.
- Alzheimer's disease and dementia: One of Crankshaft's friends, Ralph Meckler, had a wife who no longer recognized him. A neighbor, Lucy McKenzie, also exhibited symptoms and moved to a nursing home. The character died in the March 7th, 2009, strip.
- Access to higher education among the poor: Crankshaft recognized that the students on his bus route would never better themselves if they did not attend college, yet they were too poor to do so. Therefore, Crankshaft sold an extensive collection of movie posters to set up a fund so they could attend college after graduation. However, he never bothered to invest the money, so the students could only attend one semester. In the June 29, 2011, strip, it is revealed that all the "roughriders" he sent to one semester of college have graduated, and since Crankshaft could not attend all their graduations, they brought the graduation to his porch.
- Recent history: The anniversary of the May 4, 1970, shooting and killing of Kent State University students by Ohio National Guard troops was commemorated through flashbacks of Pam and Jeff's involvement. It is also revealed that Crankshaft fought in the Battle of Normandy. Chris was also present in Manhattan during the September 11, 2001 Terrorist Attack.
- Rape: Crankshaft became the subject of some degree of controversy when a 2007 strip had Ed Crankshaft expressing the idea that only young, attractive women need to fear sexual assault, implying that rape was in some sense a compliment. It was pulled from publication in at least one paper.

Crankshaft often features flashback scenes involving Ed (or one of his friends) as a younger individual. Between Thanksgiving and Christmas of 2005, flashback scenes were used extensively in a storyline that had Ed and several of his war buddies visiting the World War II Memorial in Washington, DC.

Daily strips commencing July 20, 2009, appear to show Ed Crankshaft in a state of grave decline, his life flashing before his eyes as he attends a Little League baseball game. This narrative development was immediately preceded by the death of Tom Batiuk's father, Martin. It was later revealed to be a fast forward, and the strip went back to more familiar adventures the next week. This timeline eventually came back starting in late 2017, but in the sister strip Funky Winkerbean which, because of two time skips, takes place several decades later than the Crankshaft series. On September 9, this included this first appearance of the older and sicker Crankshaft in 8 years, showing him living in a nursing home. This story line also featured other members of the cast visibly older as well and implies a possible relationship between his granddaughter Mindy Murdoch and Funky Winkerbean regular Pete Roberts-Reynolds.
