= Funky Winkerbean =

Comic strip by Tom Batiuk

- Tom Batiuk's Funky Winkerbean (February 3, 2012)
- Author: Tom Batiuk
- Illustrator(s): Tom Batiuk (1972–1994); Chuck Ayers (1994–2017, 2018, 2019–2022); Rick Burchett (2017–2019); John Byrne (2003, 2022)
- Current status/schedule: Concluded
- Launch date: March 27, 1972
- End date: December 31, 2022
- Syndicate(s): Publishers-Hall Syndicate (1972–1986), North America Syndicate (King Features Syndicate) (1986–2022)
- Genre(s): Humor (early years), comedy-drama

Funky Winkerbean was an American comic strip by Tom Batiuk. Distributed by North America Syndicate, a division of King Features Syndicate, it appeared in more than 400 newspapers worldwide.

While Batiuk was a 23-year-old middle school art teacher in Elyria, Ohio, he began drawing cartoons while supervising study hall. In 1970, his characters first appeared as a weekly panel, Rapping Around, on the teenage page of the Elyria Chronicle Telegram. In 1972, Batiuk reworked some of the characters into a daily strip, which he sold to Publishers-Hall Syndicate.

Throughout its 50-year run, the strip went through several format changes. For the first 20 years of its run, the characters did not age, and the strip was nominally episodic as opposed to a serial, with humor derived from visual gags and the eccentricity of the characters. In 1992, Batiuk rebooted the strip, establishing that the characters had graduated from high school in 1988 (although later strips showed them graduating in 1972), and the series began progressing in real time. In 2007, a second "time warp" occurred, this time taking the strip ten years into the future, ostensibly to 2017, although the events of the strip still reflected a then-contemporary setting. Following the 1992 reboot and especially after the 2007 time jump, the strip was recast as a serialized drama, though most strips still featured some humor, often based on wordplay. The more drama-oriented Funky Winkerbean featured story arcs revolving around such topics as terminal cancer, adoption, prisoners of war, drug abuse, post-traumatic stress, same-sex couples attending the senior prom, and interracial marriage.

On November 17, 2022, Batiuk announced that he would be retiring the strip at the end of the year. Funky Winkerbean ended on December 31, 2022, but many of the strip's characters—including Funky himself—then began to be seen regularly in Batiuk's long-running spin-off strip Crankshaft.

== Characters and story ==
Centered at Westview High School, influenced by Batiuk's alma mater of Midview High School, near Grafton, Ohio, the strip initially focused on several students: Funky Winkerbean, "Crazy" Harry Klinghorn, Barry Balderman, "Bull" Bushka, Cindy Summers, Junebug, Roland Mathews, Livinia Swenson, Leslie P. "Les" Moore, the majorette Holly Budd (daughter of Melinda Budd, original majorette for Westview High), and Lisa Crawford.

From 1972 to 1992, the strip was highly gag-oriented, with humor coming from physical and prop comedy and surreal situations: running gags included the school's sentient computer's subjecting the students to its obsession with Star Trek; "Crazy" Harry's ability to play pizzas like records; the school's winless football team; and the band director's attempts to win each year's "Battle of the Bands," despite the fact that the contest always coincided with a natural hindrance (usually heavy rain).

Although the titular everyman, Funky Winkerbean, was the ostensible main character, the nerds Les Moore and Lisa Crawford became breakout characters and the strip's primary focus. Supporting characters included the obsessive majorette Holly (who never removed her uniform), "Crazy" Harry (who lived in his locker), Jerome T. "Bull" Bushka (the school's star athlete and Les's tormentor), and the popular girl Cindy. Rounding out the cast was the Westview High staff, including Principal Al Burch; the counselor, Fred Fairgood; the secretary, Betty Reynolds (who actually ran the school); the teachers Rita Wrighton, Ann Randall (who would become Fred's wife in 1984) and Ginny Wolfe; the football coach, John "Jack" Stropp; and the band director, Harry L. Dinkle.

The name "Funky Winkerbean" was a composite from suggestions from some of Batiuk's art students. The Funky and Les characters are based on former roommates of Batiuk.

== 1992 relaunch (Act II) ==
In 1992, Batiuk changed the strip's format. It was established that Funky, Les, Cindy and all the rest of the previous cast had graduated from Westview in 1988; their college years were skipped, and the story continued in their adulthood. Subsequently, the characters aged in real time and underwent significant life changes. Funky married Cindy in 1998; they later divorced in 2002. Les and Lisa married in a Halloween-themed 1996 story that saw them dressed as Batman and Robin. Funky now co-owned the local pizza parlor with Tony Montoni, Les taught English at Westview, Crazy Harry was the local mailman, Bull was the Scapegoats' coach, and Cindy a national-level television newscaster. The strip followed their stories as well as those of a new generation at Westview, including Wally, Becky, Darin and Monroe. Overtly whimsical elements were now downplayed, and some of the series' running gags from the 1972–92 years were recast in a more serious light. For instance, Bull's hectoring of Les became the focus of a storyline on domestic violence and child abuse when it was revealed in 1998 that Bull abused Les to cope with being abused by his own father.

Though humorous storylines remained a mainstay, the strip also examined subjects more traditionally associated with soap opera or serialized comics. Most notably, a teenage pregnancy storyline had Lisa becoming pregnant as a teenager; she placed the child for adoption. Her child, Darin, grew up with his adopted family and became a regular character. Other storylines dealt with suicide, teen dating violence, capital punishment, alcoholism (Funky himself struggled with alcoholism and recovery), and other grim subjects.

Perhaps the most widely discussed storylines involved characters who went through catastrophic suffering. In 2005, Batiuk sent newlyweds Wally Winkerbean and Becky to Afghanistan as a part of an anti-landmine effort by the Vietnam Veterans of America Foundation; Wally nearly died after stepping on a mine. He was saved when his Afghan companion Kahn managed to knock the mine away, only to be punched out for selling the Stinger that killed his fellow troops. The couple returned to the US with an adopted daughter, Rana, who was left orphaned after her family was killed by a suicide bomber.

Even more attention was focused on the ongoing suffering and eventual death of Lisa Crawford Moore.

=== Lisa's story ===
The death of Lisa (October 4, 2007).

A recurring storyline for many years was Lisa Moore's battle with breast cancer. She first dealt with it when diagnosed in 1999. Soon after, she learned that Holly Budd was also a breast cancer survivor. After going through chemotherapy and a mastectomy, Lisa's cancer went into remission.

In March 2006, Lisa's cancer returned in a more serious form. Following another round of chemotherapy, her cancer appeared to go into remission again in early 2007, but on May 9, 2007, her doctor revealed that her medical charts had gotten mixed up and her disease was not only progressing, but had become inoperable. In a King Features press release, it was revealed that "Lisa will start chemo again, learn that her long-range prospects are poor, stop chemotherapy, deal with telling her daughter about her cancer situation, [and] testify before Congress about the need for cancer research and cope with friends and family." Batiuk was very open about the fact that Lisa's latest ordeal would end with her death and some of the events that would happen as a result.

The series polarized the comics community, with Batiuk being both praised for dealing with the topic and criticized for his graphic depiction of Lisa's slow deterioration and ultimate death. The entire storyline, which culminated with Lisa's death in the October 4, 2007, strip (excerpt at right), was collected and published in a book, Lisa's Story: The Other Shoe. This book, which includes the strips from Lisa's initial battle with cancer (which had itself been collected in book form in 2004), was published before the series had finished running in syndication. In 2007, Batiuk discussed his reasoning for pursuing the plotline, saying that he was inspired by his own battle against prostate cancer.

== Second time jump (Act III) ==
On October 21, 2007, Funky Winkerbean underwent its second "time warp," this time jumping 10 years ahead from Lisa's death and aging the cast of characters accordingly; those that were children are now high school age, and the original cast are in their mid-forties. Readers got a preview of the new-look feature starting with the October 5 strip in which a middle-aged widower Les talks to an unseen psychologist about events that immediately followed Lisa's passing, which are then depicted in flashback form. The October 21 strip shows a younger Les talking with Summer about death in general to help her understand that of Lisa's, before switching to the new-look Moores in the closing frames, and the first week of strips that followed, following the Moores participating in a Making Strides walk, have a banner saying "Act III: Ten Years Later" in the first frame (an "Act III" statement directing readers to the official website was discreetly included in fine print for some time afterward).

The relaunched Funky, Batiuk said, "is going to be a different strip, a little bit quieter." He also promised that despite Lisa's death, she will remain a presence in strip through flashbacks, remembrances, and a series of videos she recorded for daughter Summer just before she died. Montoni's will have opened several locations, including in New York City, Summer will have grown into a popular 15-year-old basketball star (in contrast to her geeky father), and Bull's adopted daughter Jinx, as well as Becky's adopted daughter Rana, are high-school aged. Batiuk explained that he wanted the comic to move so far ahead in order to prevent it from being an extended grieving process, to ensure that the next generation of students he followed were related to the original cast of characters, and to bring his original characters' ages closer to his target audience's. After the flash forward, all the strip's prominent adult male characters—Funky, Les, Bull and Crazy Harry—are 46 years old.

=== Major storylines ===
While a few of the mainstay elements—most notably, storylines revolving around the Westview High School band and now-retired director Harry Dinkle, and classroom spot gags—reappear in Act III on occasion, the focus once again is on dramatic storylines with continuing story arcs:

==== Return of Wally Winkerbean ====
Wally Winkerbean—who had returned to Iraq before the relaunch—is not in the core cast as shown on the Funky Winkerbean website, and it was also revealed that Becky had remarried (John Howard, owner of the Comics Emporium) sometime in the 10 years after Lisa's death. For nearly two years after the relaunch, Wally's fate remained unknown, although early on, Batiuk wrote on his blog that what happened to Wally "may not be what you think happened." Batiuk also revealed that a "clue" to Wally's fate could be found in the October 11 strip, which features Les getting mugged in New York after Lisa's death after walking past a newspaper vending machine with a headline saying "Soldiers Taken Hostage."

Several strips made allusions to Wally's disappearance, including one featuring Becky Howard's car having a POW/MIA bumper sticker and her placing a U.S. flag on an unidentified grave. In the July 12, 2009, strip, it is finally shown that Wally is alive and in full military uniform; a backstory reveals that Funky got a call from his ex-wife, Cindy, informing him that Wally was alive and that she had conducted an interview that was to air on the news that evening. It is revealed that Wally has been held as a prisoner of war in Iraq for the past decade (possibly taken hostage around the time of Lisa's death), and—unaware that he was presumed dead and that Becky had remarried—said during that interview that what kept him sane during his time in captivity was thinking about his wife and family. Funky visits the Howards to reveal that Wally is alive and in good health. In the August 9, 2009, strip, it is revealed that the grave Becky had visited all these years was that of Wally's assumed remains. Wally has made occasional appearances since his return to Westview, and his first appearance as a central character in a storyline that began on February 1, 2010.

==== Other storylines ====
Darin Fairgood, another prominent character who appeared in the strip throughout Act II, had also been unseen since the 2007 relaunch, but reappeared in the April 1, 2008 strip alongside Eric "Mooch" Myers and John Howard helping his old high school buddy Pete Roberts move back into town. Pete is the latest resident of the apartment above Montoni's. Les and Lisa lived there before buying their home. Becky and Wally took it over, and then apparently during the time jump John and Becky lived there together before John turned it into a storage space for his comics, probably since the basement shop has flooded in the past.

During 2010, Funky became the central character in a storyline in which he has a flashback to his high school days 30 years earlier in Westview. The flashback ran concurrently with a storyline where Funky was seriously injured in a car accident, caused by a young woman whose car veers into the path of Funky's car while she was talking on a cellphone while driving. During several flashback scenes, Funky had seen (and in some cases, visited with) teen-aged versions of himself, Crazy Harry and Holly Budd (Funky's wife-to-be), and a younger Mr. Dinkle—all as they appeared in Funky Winkerbean strips in the early 1980s. Although the recovery aspect of the accident storyline continued into the fall, the flashback scenes ended when Funky regained consciousness at the hospital.

A storyline that began in April 2012 featured a same-sex couple wanting to go to Westview High School's prom together and purchasing tickets from Jinx Bushka, a member of the Senior Prom committee. The story explored the reaction from Westview residents, most notably anti-LBGT activist and head of the Senior Prom parent volunteers Roberta Blackburn, who launches an effort to stop the couple from attending prom by forming a protest outside the school. When a group of students led by Summer Moore supporting LBGT couples attending the prom plan a counter-protest, principal Nate Green defuses the situation by calling a school assembly and announces that gay couples will be allowed to attend the prom, and that he will not have intolerance at Westview High School be a policy issue during his tenure.

Some time after Lisa's death, Les begins dating Cayla Williams, a black teacher at Westview High. Their relationship blossoms into love and in the fall of 2012, the two were married. Also that fall, Les's daughter, Summer, and Cayla's daughter, Keisha, begin attending college. In April 2013, a storyline began revolving around Darin Fairgood's biological father, Frankie Piece, attempting to meet his biological son; this coincided with the release of Les's book Lisa's Story, detailing her life, battle with breast cancer and events since her death. Frankie, alongside his friend, Lenny Gant, eventually meets with Darin, attempting to blackmail him into doing a reality series about their reunion, but Les, Cayla and the rest of the gang—aware that the show's only objective was to tarnish Lisa's name and character—help Darin thwart Frankie's plans.

In January 2013, Fred Fairgood—now retired as principal of Westview High—suffered a major stroke and was barely alive at the hospital; he is later shown to be recovering at home, although he is disabled. As Fred is beginning his recovery, a woman identifying herself as Kerry Fairgood, Fred's daughter (from a previous relationship, before he married Ann) shows up at the hospital and proves that she is indeed his biological daughter. Ann Fairgood is forced to admit that her marriage to Fred was not the happy one they had made it out to be publicly and that they shielded Darin from their unhappiness.

In 2011, before Fred Fairgood fell ill, another longtime Westview staff member—Jock Strapp, the former football coach and physical education teacher—had died of prostate cancer, although this was acknowledged only briefly.

In 2013 Funky's wife Holly—whose son Cory is in Afghanistan—finds that he has an old "Starbuck Jones" comic book collection and begins collecting missing issues to make the collection complete; she soon has issues #7; #123; #54; #104; #36 (on eBay); #216; and in July 2014 during a week-long cliffhanger searches for the rare and elusive #115. First missing it at a comic book convention and then losing it when her credit card would not work, she finally finds #115, along with an equally rare "Ashcan" version (a penciled version of a comic strip before the final printing). When a couple gives her a "Starbuck Jones" comic book Holly presents them with a "Holy Grail" of Action Comics #243.

During the summer of 2015, the present-day incarnations of the Westview gang meet up with their teen-aged selves during a class reunion; it is revealed in the storyline's finale that Les—who helped organize the event—had passed out during the reunion (for unexplained reasons) and was having a dream.

In 2019, Bull dealt with the effects of chronic traumatic encephalopathy. The storyline included Bull's death.

=== Continuity with other strips ===
The continuity of the Crankshaft strip is as much as 20 years behind that of Funky Winkerbean; strips in both comics in August and September 2011 show Cayla Williams, a high school teacher and secretary to Principal Nate Green and Les's fiancée, with Keisha her teenage daughter, to be a college-age student in the former. In the January 27, 2015, installment of Funky Winkerbean, a throwback crossover shows Crankshaft as a bus driver, while Crankshaft also has a throwback crossover that shows Crankshaft as a bus driver on Funky Winkerbean. This time difference between the strips was gradually retconned away as Funky Winkerbean finished its run in 2022, with the characters crossing over more frequently through the year in the same timeframe, culminating in the week leading up to Christmas showing characters traveling to and meeting up at a church choir concert in Crankshaft's Centerville.

On January 19, 2015, Funky Winkerbean began a crossover with Dick Tracy when two of the Winkerbean characters decided to attend a police auction of stolen comic books recovered from the Dick Tracy criminal the "Jumbler". Dick Tracy has a concurrent crossover with Funky Winkerbean concerning the comic book auction.

== Third time jump (the final week) ==
Funky and the rest of the cast last appeared on the Christmas Day 2022 episode. The final week was set in the late 21st century. Summer's granddaughter (also named Lisa) found two books in a robot-staffed bookstore; Westview, written by Summer, and Lisa's Story: The Other Shoe, written by Les. It was explained that a mass book burning (referred to as the Burnings) had taken place in the past, but somehow these books survived, and Summer was famous due to the success of Westview. The last episode saw Lisa Jr's mother telling her to retire for the night, and the final panel had both books on Lisa Jr's bed. John Byrne did the art for the final week.

== Controversy ==
The more dramatic turns of the storyline have led to mixed responses from readers. Negative reaction to a 2007 strip featuring Wally getting blown up by an I.E.D. (which turned out in the next strip to be him playing a computer game), included two papers that ran the strip receiving irate phone calls and letters to the editor, and led to Batiuk issuing an apology soon after the strip ran.

Reactions to later chapters of Lisa's Story led to further complaints over the comic's gloomy content, and Batiuk has mentioned in interviews that he has received complaints about the direction of the storyline. Web comic Shortpacked produced a satirical strip in which most of the words of Funky Winkerbean characters' dialogue are replaced by the word "cancer." The Comics Curmudgeon also made frequent reference to the seemingly unremitting gloom of the strip, calling it "a black hole of bleakness and depression and cancer from which no joy or laughter can escape." The strip has also inspired two blogs, Stuck Funky (which has been inactive since 2010) and Son of Stuck Funky (the second blog, which started soon after Stuck Funky stopped posting) which provides commentary on both FW and Crankshaft.

A Crankshaft strip from May 23, 2007, sarcastically addresses the controversy from Batiuk's perspective, with a character remarking of newspaper comic strips that "everyone knows they're supposed to be funny". In the Funky Winkerbean strip published on September 30, 2007, Les essentially echoes the Crankshaft comment.

In a September 2009 storyline that many readers also interpreted as Batiuk's addressing of the strip's latter-day bleakness, a group of parents protested a school production of Wit because the themes of cancer and death offended them. In her defense of the play, the character of Susan Smith, a Westview High teacher and drama director, was viewed by critics as a mouthpiece for Batiuk's views on the importance of dramatic entertainment.

Over the week of July 7, 2008, Pearls Before Swine parodied the tendency of Funky Winkerbean towards killing off main characters when it killed off Rat and the strip's own author, Stephan Pastis (the two would later be returned to the strip via the intervention of the head of United Feature Syndicate), with Tom Batiuk even allowing Pastis to use his representation of the Angel of Death (unofficially named Masky McDeath) in the second to last strip in the series. A year earlier, as part of a long series featuring Rat getting stranded in Surprise, Arizona, Pastis remarked to Pig that serial strips handle long stories better and featured Funky, Holly, Lisa, and Les in a parody referencing, among other things, Funky's alcoholism and both Holly and Lisa's breast cancer. Pastis was given Batiuk's blessing to run the strip, but just before it was scheduled to run the controversy over the cancer storyline grew to the point where Pastis pulled it from publication as he believed, although he never mentioned the disease by name, anyone who read his strip could infer that he was making light of cancer patients and Pastis did not wish to have Pearls drawn into the controversy.

== Spinoffs ==
Two minor characters were spun off into their own strips: the bus driver Crankshaft in 1987 and the talk show host John Darling in 1979. John Darling ended in 1990 when Batiuk had Darling murdered in the penultimate strip after a real-life financial dispute with the strip's syndicator. In Funky Winkerbean, Les Moore wrote a book about Darling's murder and solved the case in a 1997 storyline. Crankshaft is still being published as of 2026 with some of the former Funky Winkerbean characters being featured in the storylines.

== Comic book connections ==
Batiuk's neighbor, comic book writer Jenny Isabella, occasionally appeared in the strip as herself. Another comic book creator, superhero artist John Byrne, drew ten weeks of the strip while Batiuk was recovering from foot surgery in 2003 and during the final week of the strip, and has appeared in the strip himself in 2005 as a character.

Batiuk also occasionally parodies covers of classic Silver Age comics to comment on storyline elements in the strip itself. This is usually done in the Sunday comic and features a cover and a current storyline being highlighted. An example is the October 27, 2013 strip, which featured the cover of Superboy Volume 1, #57. This cover showed the title character playing many positions in baseball, highlighting the then-current storyline where Bull Bushka is Westview High School's Athletic Director, Girls Basketball Coach, and was named the school's head football coach.

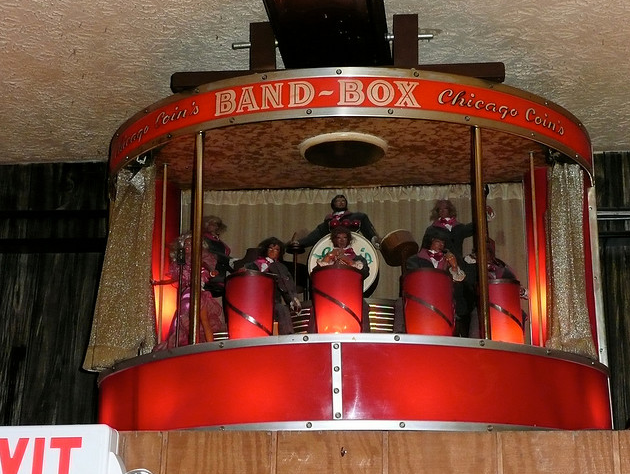
The band box at Luigi's Restaurant, Akron, Ohio

Montoni's Pizza is modeled after Luigi's, an Italian restaurant and pizzeria in downtown Akron, Ohio. There is a framed and signed Funky Winkerbean strip hung in the restaurant. The band box frequently shown in the interior of the shop above the entrance is an actual fixture in the restaurant.

After the second time skip, Batiuk designed the comic book store around the shop he frequents, Ground Zero Comics and Cards in Strongsville, Ohio. Captain America's shield that is frequently shown in the background is on the mantel in the shop.

In a 2011 interview, Batiuk said that the character Harry L. Dinkle, self-proclaimed as the "World's Greatest Band Director," is modeled after Harry Pfingsten (1935-2021), who taught music at Grafton Junior High when Batiuk was a student there in the late 1950s before becoming the band director at Avon Lake High School from 1964 to 1991. This connection had also been reported in 2006 in the Cleveland Free Times. There had been speculation that Dinkle was also modeled on the director of The Ohio State University Marching Band, specifically Paul Droste and Jon Woods. In 1989, Harry L. Dinkle was the first comic strip character ever to "march" the Tournament of Roses parade. Dinkles, a brand of shoe designed for marching bands, is named after the character and claims to have been endorsed by Dinkle since 1986.

== Musical ==
Batiuk assisted in the writing of a stage musical adaptation of the strip, entitled Funky Winkerbean's Homecoming, set in the era while Funky was still in high school. It was performed by at least one high school drama group, beginning in 1988. Despite the title, Funky is actually a fairly minor character in the play; the focal character of Funky Winkerbean's Homecoming is Les Moore.

The musical was co-written by Andy Clark, who much later appeared as himself in the comic strip in December 2006 and June 2020. Clark is a publisher of the C. L. Barnhouse Company, and has published several Funky Winkerbean collections dedicated to the character of Harry L. Dinkle.

== Compilations ==
- Batiuk, Tom (2012). The Complete Funky Winkerbean: Volume 1 (1972–1974). Kent, Ohio: Kent State University Press. ISBN 978-1-60635-112-3. 486 pp.
- The Complete Funky Winkerbean: Volume 2 (1975–77), Kent State University Press, 2013
- The Complete Funky Winkerbean: Volume 3 (1978–80), Kent State University Press, 2014
- The Complete Funky Winkerbean: Volume 4 (1981–83), Kent State University Press, 2015
- The Complete Funky Winkerbean: Volume 5 (1984–86), Kent State University Press, 2016
- The Complete Funky Winkerbean: Volume 6 (1987–89), Kent State University Press, 2017
- The Complete Funky Winkerbean: Volume 7 (1990–92), Kent State University Press, 2018
- The Complete Funky Winkerbean: Volume 8 (1993–95), Kent State University Press, 2019
- The Complete Funky Winkerbean: Volume 9 (1996–98), Kent State University Press, 2020
- The Complete Funky Winkerbean: Volume 10 (1999–2001), Kent State University Press, 2021
- The Complete Funky Winkerbean: Volume 11 (2002–2004), Kent State University Press, 2022
- The Complete Funky Winkerbean: Volume 12 (2005-2007), Black Squirrel Books, 2022
- The Complete Funky Winkerbean: Volume 13 (2008-2010), Black Squirrel Books, 2024
- The Complete Funky Winkerbean: Volume 14 (2011-2013), Black Squirrel Books, 2025
- The Complete Funky Winkerbean: Volume 15 (2014-2016), Black Squirrel Books, 2025
