= Tom Batiuk =

American cartoonist (born 1947)

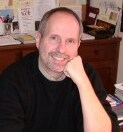
- Batiuk in 2013
- Born: Thomas Martin Batiuk; March 14, 1947 (age 79); Akron, Ohio, U.S.
- Occupations: Comic strip creator, writer, artist
- Awards: Inkpot Award (1999)
- Website: tombatiuk.com

Thomas Martin Batiuk /ˈbætɪk/ (born March 14, 1947) is an American comic strip creator, best known for his long-running newspaper strip Funky Winkerbean.

== Career ==
Born in Akron, Ohio, Batiuk attended Kent State University, from which he graduated in 1969 with a Bachelor of Fine Arts degree, majoring in painting. He went on to teach art in junior high school. He put his experiences to use in his gag-a-day Funky Winkerbean, which first appeared in print on March 27, 1972. With the success of the strip, he abandoned his teaching career, occasionally returning to the classroom to refresh his sources. He authored two spinoff strips, John Darling, which ran from 1979 through 1990, ending with the death of the title character, and Crankshaft, which began syndication in 1987. These strips sometimes experience crossovers.

Over the years, Batiuk's strips have taken on an increasing narrative continuity. Starting in 1986, Funky, and to a lesser extent Crankshaft, sometimes abandoned humor to explore serious, even tragic subject matter. Funky Winkerbean has been time-jumped twice, first aging the characters to their late 20s early 30s and a second jump pushed them into late middle age. Crankshaft was never jumped, but he is shown in crossovers to suffer a rather painful retirement.

His stories often involve strong drama elements combined with generally rosy outcomes or ending with a pun. They also show a strong belief in God, as well as sympathies for the American military. On the other hand, Funky Winkerbean dealt very critically with intelligent design, and two students in the strip even did a pro-evolution take-off on Johnny Hart's B.C. Funky Winkerbean has dealt with teen suicide and breast cancer, the latter of which mirrored Batiuk's own wife's diagnosis and treatment. Batiuk was a finalist for the Pulitzer Prize in 2008 for the comic strips involving breast cancer.

== Personal life ==
Batiuk lives in Medina, Ohio.
