= Roberta Maxwell =

Canadian actress (born 1941)

- Born: Roberta Farnham Maxwell; June 17, 1941 (age 84); Toronto, Ontario, Canada
- Occupation: Actress
- Years active: 1956–present

Roberta Farnham Maxwell (born June 17, 1941) is a Canadian actress.

== Biography ==
Maxwell began studying for the stage in her early teens. She joined John Clark for two years as the child co-host of his Junior Magazine series for CBC Television. She first performed at the Stratford Shakespeare Festival in 1956.

She appeared as Ursula in Much Ado About Nothing, Lady Anne in Richard III, Olivia in Twelfth Night, and Anne in The Merry Wives of Windsor, before going on to England, where she spent three years in repertory. She made her West End debut with Robert Morley and Molly Picon in A Majority of One.

She first traveled to New York at age 19 in 1960. She debuted on Broadway in The Prime of Miss Jean Brodie in 1968, going on to five more plays with the Tyrone Guthrie Theatre in Minneapolis, Minnesota. In 1974, she was back on Broadway playing the role of Jill in Equus, which starred Anthony Hopkins and Peter Firth.

Maxwell played Lavinia Mannion (opposite Joan Hackett's Christine Mannion) in the 1978 PBS adaptation of Mourning Becomes Electra. In 1982, she starred as Rosalind in the Stratford Festival's stage production of Shakespeare's As You Like It, a production which was videotaped and telecast on Canadian television in 1983. In 2011, she played the duchess of York in Richard III In 2009-10 she appeared in two episodes of the Syfy series Warehouse 13.

Maxwell has also appeared in several noteworthy films including Rich Kids (1979), Popeye and The Changeling (both 1980), Psycho III (1986), Philadelphia (1993), Dead Man Walking (1995) and Brokeback Mountain (2005). Her performance in the 1998 independent Canadian dramady Last Night garnered Maxwell a nomination for a Genie Award for Best Actress in a Supporting Role.

== Filmography ==
=== Film ===
Year	Title	Role	Notes
1968	A Great Big Thing	Eve	
1979	Rich Kids	Barbara Peterfreund	
1980	The Changeling	Eva Lingstrom	
1980	Popeye	Nana Oyl	
1986	Psycho III	Tracy Venable	
1989	Kingsgate	Marlene	
1993	Philadelphia	Judge Tate	
1995	Dead Man Walking	Lucille Poncelet	
1997	Fall	Joan Alterman	
1997	The Postman	Irene March	
1998	Last Night	Mrs. Wheeler	
1999	Water Damage	Dr. Winfrey	
2001	Full Disclosure	Sarah Archer	Direct-to-video
2005	Brokeback Mountain	Mrs. Twist, Jack's Mother	
2007	The Killing Floor	Ms. Alimet	Uncredited
2014	Hungry Hearts	Anne	
2014	What We Have	Rosemary	
2015	Stranger in the House	Alice	
2015	Unearthing	Mary Hart	
2017	Gwendolyn Green	Gwendolyn Green	Short film
2020	Percy	Louise Schmeiser	
2022	This is Harriet	Beatrice	Short film

=== Television ===
Year	Title	Role	Notes
1957–1958	Junior Magazine	Herself / Host	Various episodes
1957	Folio	Unknown	Episode: "Peer Gynt"
1957, 1959, 1960, 1961	Encounter	** / Marjorie / Kathryn Loring / Laurie / Stella Meredith / Helen / Betty	Episodes: "The Movie Star"; "Lady's Choice"; "The Room"; "The Oddball"; "The Watchers"; "The Touch of Light"; "Counsel for the Defense"
1960	Just Mary	(voice)	
1962	BBC Sunday-Night Play	Carolyn Claybourne	Episode: "The Day Before Atlanta"
1962	Emergency-Ward 10	Nurse Merritt	2 episodes
1965	Festival	Ria Hennessy	Episode: "A Cheap Bunch of Nice Flowers"
1966	Henry V	Unknown	TV movie
1974	A Touch of the Poet	Sara Melody	TV movie
1974	Great Performances	Clara	Episode: "The Widowing of Mrs. Holroyd"
1974	Another World	Barbara Weaver	91 episodes
1976	The Other Side of Victory	Unknown	TV movie
1978	For the Record	Carol	Episode: "A Matter of Choice"
1978	Mourning Becomes Electra	Lavinia Mannon	TV miniseries (four-part) – Episodes: "The Secret"; "The Homecoming"; "The Hunted"; "An Act of Justice"
1979	The Other Side of Victory	Nancy Turner	TV movie
1981	Today's FBI	Phyllis Slater	Episode: "The Bureau"
1982	Lois Gibbs and the Love Canal	Mary Belinski	TV movie
1982	Faerie Tale Theatre	Griselda / Queen Beatrice	Episode: "The Tale of the Frog Prince"
1983	As You Like It	Rosalind	TV movie
1983	Special Bulletin	Diane Silverman	TV movie
1984	St. Elsewhere	Cat Lady	Episode: "Hello, Goodbye"
1986–1987	Airwaves	Jean Lipton	26 episodes
1988	All My Children	Nanny Judith	1 episode
1989	Great Performances	Mrs. Webb	Episode: "Our Town"
1989	The Equalizer	Justice Lindsey Smith	Episode: "Heart of Justice"
1989	The Hitchhiker	Marybeth	Episode: "The Dying Generation"
1996	We the Jury	Lydia Bosco	TV movie
1996	Mistrial	Judge Friel	TV movie
1997	When Innocence Is Lost	Cynthia Adams	TV movie
1997	Liberty!	Mercy Otis Warren	TV miniseries (six-part) – Episodes: "The Reluctant Revolutionaries"; "Blows Must Decide"; "The Times That Try Men's Souls"; "Oh Fatal Ambition!"
1998	As the End of the Day: The Sue Rodriguez Story	Doe	TV movie
1999	Shadow Lake	Louise Garvey	TV movie
1999	Too Rich: The Doris Duke Story	Myra	TV movie
1999	Forget Me Never	Unknown	TV movie
1999	Twice in a Lifetime	Eloise Hawke / Eileen Kotter	Episode: "School's Out"
2000	Law & Order	Teresa Brewster	Episode: "Collision"
2000	The Outer Limits	Mrs. Reynolds	Episode: "Inner Child"
2000	Life in a Day	Carla Jennings	TV movie
2000	The Dinosaur Hunter	Adult Julia	TV movie
2001	What Makes a Family	Claire	TV movie
2002	Scar Tissue	Mora Carlisle-Nevsky	TV movie
2002	Benjamin Franklin	Deborah Read Franklin	TV miniseries documentary (three-part) – Episodes: "Let the Experiment Be Made"; "The Making of a Revolutionary"; "The Chess Master"
2003	The Atwood Stories	Lois	Episode: "Death by Landscape"
2004	Gracie's Choice	Judge	TV movie
2005	Vinegar Hill	Ellen's Mother	TV movie
2005	Riding the Bus with My Sister	Valerie	TV movie
2005	Queer as Folk	Michael's Lawyer	Episode: "5.3"
2006	Booky Makes Her Mark	Aunt Aggie	TV movie
2006	The Mermaid Chair	Nelle	TV movie
2009–2010	Warehouse 13	Rebecca St. Clair	2 episodes
2010	Rookie Blue	Marie D'Abramo	Episode: "Bullet Proof"
2014	Theater Talk	Herself / Guest	Episode: "Dick Cavett, Roberta Maxwell and Marcia Rodd on 'Hellman v. McCarthy'"
2017	The Gabriels: Election Year in the Life of One Family	Patricia Gabriel	TV miniseries (three-part) – Episodes: "Hungry"; "What Did You Expect?"; "Women of a Certain Age"

=== Theater ===
Year	Title	Role	Notes
1958	Two Gentlemen of Verona	Ursula	
1968	The Prime of Miss Jean Brodie	Various Roles	Understudy: Sister Helena, Sandy
1968–1969	The House of Atreus	Handmaiden / Chorus	
1968–1969	The Resistible Rise of Arturo Ui	Betty Dullfeet	
1969	King Henry VI	Katherine	
1970	Othello	Desdemona	
1970	Hay Fever	Sorel Bliss	
1972	There's One in Every Marriage	Lucienne	
1973	The Plough and the Stars	Nora Clitheroe	
1973	The Merchant of Venice	Jessica	
1974–1977	Equus	Jill Mason	
1977	The Merchant	Portia Contarini	
1988–1989	Our Town	Mrs. Webb	
1996	Summer and Smoke	Mrs. Winemiller	
2015	Indian Ink	Eleanor Swan	American Conservatory Theater production
2016	The Gabriels: Election Year In the Life of One Family (Hungry, What Did You Expect?, and Women of a Certain Age)	Patricia Gabriel	Play Cycle by Richard Nelson at The Public Theater

== Awards and recognition ==
- 1970: Obie Award for Distinguished Performance by an Actress, Whistle in the Dark — Winner
- 1971: Drama Desk Award for Best Lead Performance, Slag — Winner
- 1977: Obie Award for Distinguished Performance by an Actress, Ashes — Winner
- 1999: Genie Award for Best Actress in a Supporting Role, Last Night — Nominee
- 2003: Gemini Award for Best Performance by an Actress in a Leading Role in a Dramatic Program or Mini-Series, Scar Tissue — Nominee
- 2006: Online Film & Television Association Award for Best Ensemble, Brokeback Mountain — Winner
- 2006: International Online Cinema Award for Best Ensemble (INOCA), Brokeback Mountain — Nominee
