= List of House Calls episodes =

This is a list of episodes for the CBS television series House Calls.

== Series overview ==
Season	Episodes	Originally released		Rank	Rating
Season	Episodes	First released	Last released	Rank	Rating
1	13	December 17, 1979	March 17, 1980	14	22.1 (Tied with Real People)
2	20	November 17, 1980	April 13, 1981	8	22.4 (Tied with Three's Company)
3	24	November 2, 1981	September 6, 1982	23	19.2

== Episodes ==
=== Season 1 (1979–80) ===
No. overall	No. in season	Title	Directed by	Written by	Original release date	Prod. code
1	1	"Paging Dr. Michaels"	Alex March	Max Shulman & Julius J. Epstein	December 17, 1979	54404
2	2	"Final Exams"	Nick Havinga	Kathy Greer & Bill Greer	December 24, 1979	54406
3	3	"Side by Side"	Mel Ferber	Kathy Greer & Bill Greer	December 31, 1979	54401
4	4	"Crisis of Confidence"	Mel Ferber	Sheldon Keller & Bryan Blackburn	January 7, 1980	54407
5	5	"Defeat of Clay"	Bob Claver	Kathy Greer & Bill Greer	January 14, 1980	54409
6	6	"A Slight Case of Quarantine"	Bob Claver	Story by : Lee Aronsohn; Teleplay by : Kathy Greer & Bill Greer	January 21, 1980	54412
7	7	"Mobster Tale"	Mel Ferber	Kathy Greer & Bill Greer	January 28, 1980	54413
8	8	"Old Is Beautiful"	Mel Ferber	Sheldon Keller & Bryan Blackburn	February 4, 1980	54414
9	9	"The Phantom of Kensington"	Bob Claver	Kathy Greer & Bill Greer	February 11, 1980	54417
10	10	"Beast of Kensington"	Bob Claver	Story by : Sheldon Keller & Bryan Blackburn; Teleplay by : Sheldon Keller & Bryan Blackburn & Jeffrey Davis	February 18, 1980	54411
11	11	"I'll Be Suing You"	Mel Ferber	Mark Egan & Mark Solomon	March 3, 1980	54410
12	12	"Take My Granddaughter Please"	Nick Havinga	Story by : Jeffrey Davis & Mort Greene; Teleplay by : Jeffrey Davis & Mort Greene & Kathy Greer & Bill Greer	March 10, 1980	54415
13	13	"Rock Around the Doc"	Nick Havinga	Mark Egan & Mark Solomon	March 17, 1980	54419

=== Season 2 (1980–81) ===
No. overall	No. in season	Title	Directed by	Written by	Original release date	Prod. code
14	1	"Jailhouse Doc"	Mel Ferber	Kathy Greer & Bill Greer	November 17, 1980	55513
15	2	"Sex and the Single Surgeon"	Ray Austin	Dianne Messina & Lou Messina	November 24, 1980	55502
16	3	"Mugger and Other Strangers"	Ray Austin	Laurie Gelman	December 1, 1980	55515
17	4	"Nude Girl"	Bruce Bilson	Story by : Bill Daley; Teleplay by : Bill Daley & Kathy Greer & Bill Greer	December 8, 1980	55514
18	5	"Kensington Follies"	Ray Austin	Kathy Greer & Bill Greer	December 15, 1980	55522
19	6	"The Dead Beat"	Allen Baron	Story by : Steve McCarthy & Paul K. Taylor; Teleplay by : Kathy Greer & Bill Greer	December 29, 1980	55512
20	7	"Tenants, Anyone?"	Jeremiah Morris	Story by : Lou Messina & Dianne Messina; Teleplay by : Lou Messina & Dianne Messina and Kathy Greer & Bill Greer	January 5, 1981	55504
21	8	"In Case of Emergency"	Allen Baron	Story by : Julie Friedgen; Teleplay by : Julie Friedgen & Kathy Greer & Bill Greer	January 12, 1981	55506
22	9	"No Balls, One Strike"	Bruce Bilson	Story by : Tom Chehak; Teleplay by : Tom Chehak & Kathy Greer & Bill Greer	January 19, 1981	55508
23	10	"Bombing Out"	Allen Baron	Ken Rothrock	January 26, 1981	55509
24	11	"Six O'Clock Noose"	Mel Ferber	Story by : Suzy Simon & Laurie Newbound; Teleplay by : Suzy Simon & Laurie Newbound and Kathy Greer & Bill Greer	February 2, 1981	55507
25	12	"Officer Needs Assistance"	Wayne Rogers	Kathy Greer & Bill Greer	February 9, 1981	55518
26	13	"My Son, the Anarchist"	Ray Austin	Laurie Gelman	February 16, 1981	55523
27	14	"All About Adam"	Allen Baron	Dianne Messina & Lou Messina	February 23, 1981	55505
28	15	"Bye, Bye American Spy"	Fernando Lamas	Wayne Rogers	March 2, 1981	55525
29	16	"The Magnificent Weatherbys"	Allen Baron	Kathy Greer & Bill Greer	March 9, 1981	55527
30	17	"Kleptos and Other Maniacs"	Alan Bergmann	Kathy Greer & Bill Greer	March 16, 1981	55533
31	18	"Adieu, Kind Friend"	John Clark	Donald Ross	March 30, 1981	55511
32	19	"The Hostage Situation"	Dick Martin	Donald Ross	April 6, 1981	55528
33	20	"Have Peckler, Will Travel"	Fernando Lamas	Richard Lewis & Richard Dimitri	April 13, 1981	55526

=== Season 3 (1981–82) ===
No. overall	No. in season	Title	Directed by	Written by	Original release date	Prod. code
34	1	"Lust Weekend"	Alan Bergmann	Erik Tarloff	November 2, 1981	55531
35	2	"The Kensington Connection"	Wayne Rogers	Bill Greer & Kathy Greer	November 9, 1981	56301
36	3	"Uncle Digby"	Fernando Lamas	Bill Greer & Kathy Greer	November 16, 1981	56305
37	4	"The Sex Police"	Fernando Lamas	Bob Baublitz & Walter Dishell	November 23, 1981	56302
38	5	"Bradley's Brat"	Dick Martin	Bill Greer & Kathy Greer	November 30, 1981	56311
39	6	"The Yes Man"	Bruce Bilson	Bob Baublitz	December 7, 1981	55534
40	7	"Doctor Solomon and Mister Hide"	Allen Baron	Laurie Gelman	December 14, 1981	56310
41	8	"Son of Emergency"	Bruce Bilson	Richard Dimitri & Richard Lewis	December 21, 1981	56309
42	9	"Losers Weepers"	Fernando Lamas	Bill Greer & Kathy Greer	December 28, 1981	56316
43	10	"Fun with Doc & Jane"	Allen Baron	Bill Greer & Kathy Greer	January 4, 1982	56317
44	11	"Gays of Our Lives"	Alan Bergmann	Sam Greenbaum, Bill Greer & Kathy Greer	January 11, 1982	56324
45	12	"Man for All Surgeons"	Fernando Lamas	Bruce Ferber & David Lerner	January 18, 1982	56319
46	13	"Con-Con"	Alan Cooke	Laurie Gelman	January 25, 1982	56313
47	14	"Alien Food"	Robert Douglas	Wayne Rogers	February 1, 1982	56307
48	15	"It Ain't Necessary to Sew"	Alan Bergmann	Jewel Jaffe & Martin Ross	February 8, 1982	56320
49	16	"Conventional Warfare"	Wayne Rogers	Unknown	February 15, 1982	56318
50	17	"Hook, Line & Sinker"	Alan Cooke	Bruce Ferber & David Lerner	February 22, 1982	56327
51	18	"Campaign in the Neck"	Philip Minor	Erik Tarloff	March 1, 1982	56321
52	19	"Rising Cost of Poverty"	Robert Douglas	Unknown	March 8, 1982	56308
53	20	"Deafenwolf"	Bruce Bilson	Jackie McKane & Joel Tappis	March 22, 1982	56326
54	21	"The Weatherbys Ride Again"	Allen Baron	Unknown	May 24, 1982	56330
55	22	"Ducks of Hazzard"	Fernando Lamas	Bob Baublitz, Bruce Ferber & David Lerner	May 31, 1982	56329
56	23	"In Norman We Trust"	Alan Cooke	Bruce Ferber & David Lerner	August 30, 1982	56328
57	24	"Bone of My Bone"	Fernando Lamas	Howard Ostroff	September 6, 1982	56325
