= Jennifer Burton =

American actress

Jennifer Burton is an American model and actress in B-movies and erotic films.

== Career ==
Early in her career, Burton had roles in softcore productions such as Playtime. She also had small roles in the erotic series Emmanuelle in Space. Later, she starred as a main and supporting actor in several movies and TV productions, including Mischievous and Illusions of Sin.

== Filmography ==
=== Film ===
Year	Title	Role	Notes
1993	Desire	Cynthia Hoffman	
1995	Play Time	Lindsey	
1995	Watch Me	Samantha	
1995	I Like to Play Games	Tiffany	
1995	Killing for Love	Zoe	
1995	Call Girl	Cynthia	
1996	Night Shade	Alison Blair	
1996	Mischievous	Angela	
1996	Dead of Night	Carmen	
1997	Butterscotch: Over Berlin	Dominique	Video
1997	Illicit Dreams 2	Erica	
1997	Illusions of Sin	Amanda	
1999	The Escort III	Julie Clark	Video
2005	Charlie's Death Wish	Desk Cop	Video

=== Television ===
Year	Title	Role	Notes
1990	Get a Life	Model	"The Prettiest Week of My Life"
1992	L.A. Law	Starlet	"My Friend Flicker"
1993	Red Shoe Diaries	Coco	"Runway"
1994	National Lampoon's Blind Date	Tandi (voice)	Video game
1994	Emmanuelle in Space	Emmanuelle	TV films
1995	Red Shoe Diaries	Darcie	"Dime a Dance"
1995	Erotic Confessions	Vanessa	"Watching Vanessa"
1996	Erotic Confessions	Amy	"Southern Hospitality"
1996	Beverly Hills Bordello	Helen	"Inspiration"
1997	Erotic Confessions	Tracy	"The Hat Check Boy"
1997	Click	Jan / Officer Shelley	"The Body Beautiful", "Sexual Dependence Day"
1998	Beverly Hills Bordello	Brandy	"In the Clinches"
