= Robert O'Hearn =

American set designer

Robert O'Hearn (July 19, 1921 – May 26, 2016) was an American set designer. Though known for his productions of theatre and ballet, he was particularly associated with opera. He designed productions for the Metropolitan Opera from 1960 through 1985.

Robert O'Hearn was born in Elkhart, Indiana. He attended Indiana University, where he received his Bachelor of Arts in 1943.

From 1948 through 1952 he worked at the Brattle Theatre at Harvard University, designing numerous productions. (His work is now part of the Harvard Theatre Collection.) Having made his Broadway theatre debut in 1950 doing the set and costume design for The Releapse by John Vanbrugh, O'Hearn began working regularly on Broadway in 1953 beginning with a production of Shakespeare's Love's Labour's Lost.

O'Hearn made his Metropolitan Opera debut in 1960 with a production of Gaetano Donizetti's L'elisir d'amore, notable for the unique conceit of having Dr. Dulcamara enter by a descending balloon. O'Hearn designed 13 productions for the Met, usually working in conjunction with stage director Nathaniel Merrill.

In addition to working on Broadway and at the Met, O'Hearn designed productions for The New York City Opera, New York Shakespeare Festival, New York City Center Theater, American Ballet Theatre, New York City Ballet, Kennedy Center for the Performing Arts, Boston Opera Company, Chicago Lyric Opera, Houston Grand Opera, Ballet West, Los Angeles Civic Light Opera, and the San Francisco Ballet. He designed a production of Der Rosenkavalier for the Canadian Opera Company.

In Europe O'Hearn designed productions for the Vienna Volksoper, Bregenzer Festspiele, Hamburg State Opera, as well as productions in Strasbourg, and Karlsruhe.

From 1968 through 1988 O'Hearn was a professor at the New York Studio and Forum of Stage Design. Beginning in 1988 until his retirement in 2008, O'Hearn focused exclusively on teaching at the Jacobs School of Music at his alma mater, Indiana University.

He died in Bloomington, Indiana on May 26, 2016.
