= Illicit Dreams 2 =

1997 film

- Film poster
- Directed by: Fred Olen Ray (as Roger Collins)
- Written by: Steve Armogida
- Produced by: Fred Olen Ray (as Roger Collins)
- Starring: Tim Abell; Tane McClure; Cory Lane
- Cinematography: Gary Graver
- Edited by: Randy Basswood
- Music by: Bob Kulick
- Release date: 2 January 1997
- Running time: 85 min.
- Country: United States
- Language: English

Illicit Dreams 2 is a 1997 American erotic thriller film directed by Fred Olen Ray and a sequel to Illicit Dreams. This film's music was composed by Bob Kulick. The film starred Tim Abell, Tane McClure, Cory Lane, Max Goldberg, Jennifer Burton and Christina Hempstead in the lead roles.

== Premise ==
When a man's wife dies, the new executive of his company makes a move. Though they know that sexual relations could cause problems, that does not stop them.

== Cast ==
- Tim Abell as Jeff
- Tane McClure as Lynn Barrett
- Cory Lane as Terri
- Max Goldberg as Stan
- Jennifer Burton as Erica
- Robert Baldwin as Daniel
- Terry Burke as Leo
- Ross Hagen as Brady
- Brinke Stevens as Dianne
- Nikki Fritz as New York Woman
- Gregory Hustad as Paul
- Kevin Dean Williams as Cal
- Christopher Ray as Police Officer
- Christina Hempstead as Secretary
