= Charlie's Death Wish =

2005 film

- Directed by: Jeff Leroy
- Written by: Jeff Leroy; Phoebe Dollar
- Starring: Ron Jeremy; Phoebe Dollar
- Release date: May 10, 2005
- Language: English

Charlie's Death Wish is a 2005 action thriller film directed by Jeff Leroy and starring Ron Jeremy and Phoebe Dollar.

== Cast ==
- Phoebe Dollar as Charlie
- Ron Jeremy as Captain Al Rosenberg
- Lemmy as Himself
- Dizzy Reed as Mumbles
- Tracii Guns as Roscoe
- John Clark as Dr. Pheifer
- Jennifer Burton as Desk Cop
- Randal Malone as Harry Niche
