= Tané McClure =

American actress, singer (born 1958)

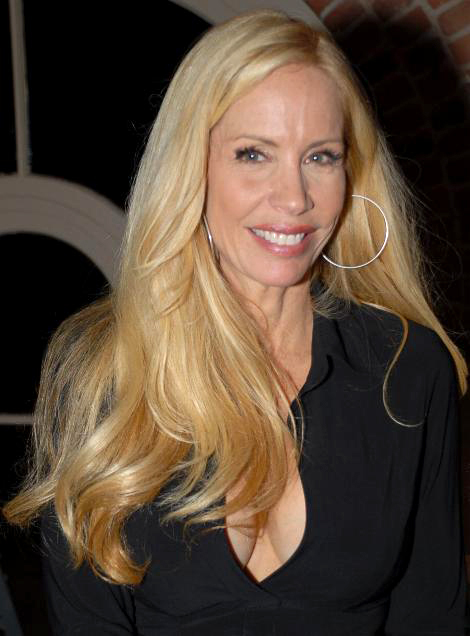
- McClure in November 2007
- Born: June 8, 1958 (age 68); Los Angeles County, California, U.S.
- Occupations: Actress; singer; model; producer; writer; director; film editor
- Years active: 1982–present
- Spouse(s): Jonathan Cain (m. 1980; div. 1984) Gary Arendts (m. 2001)
- Children: Kayla Arendts
- Father: Doug McClure

Tané M. McClure (born June 8, 1958), sometimes credited as Tahnee Cain and Tané Cain, is an American actress, singer, model, producer, writer, director, and film editor.

== Early life ==
McClure was born in Los Angeles County, California. She is the daughter of actor Doug McClure and Faye Brash, the first of his five wives. She has a half-sister, Valerie, from her father's marriage to his fourth wife, Diane Soldani, in the 1970s as well as a half-sister, Taber Parker Reiner, from her mother's third husband Donald Parker.

McClure made a cameo appearance on her father's Western television series The Virginian at age five. Raised in Hawaii, McClure moved to Northern California and, at age 17, began singing in a Latin jazz band called Sweet Honesty.

== Career ==
McClure recorded her first single, "Redwood City", in the late 1970s, and soon thereafter met the Babys and Journey keyboardist Jonathan Cain, whom she married.

Moving with him to Los Angeles, she landed a record deal in 1982 and released a self-titled (using her married name Tané Cain) album on RCA Records. A Billboard review of the album described her as "an artist to watch" and remarked that she "looks incredibly beautiful on the LP cover. Then you put it on and find out that she can sing just as well." AllMusic's Alex Henderson wrote that "the material – most of it sleek, commercial pop/rock that was co-produced and co-written by Jonathan Cain and has a Pat Benatar-ish quality – is generally excellent." McClure disliked comparisons to Benatar, preferring to identify herself with her idol Grace Slick. The album's first single, "Danger Zone", failed to chart, but the follow-up, "Holdin' On", peaked at number 37 on the Billboard Hot 100. The album did not sell as well as the label had hoped, peaking at number 121 on the Billboard album chart, and she was dropped, never to release another album. Her music career continued when she contributed three songs to the soundtrack for The Terminator in 1984 and she recorded demos for a second album in 1985, which were eventually leaked several years later to multiple AOR blogspots. McClure composed and performed a new song, "Kicks", which was heard in a bar scene on a jukebox in Fred Olen Ray's Armed Response (1986) film soundtrack.

McClure played the mother of Elle Woods (Reese Witherspoon) in Legally Blonde (2001) and its sequel, Legally Blonde 2: Red, White & Blonde (2003).

== Personal life ==
In 1980, McClure married musician, singer and songwriter Jonathan Cain, who is best known as the keyboardist and rhythm guitarist for the rock band / supergroup Journey. They divorced in 1984. McClure married Gary Arendts on July 17, 2001, and has a daughter Kayla Arendts, born c. 1998.

== Discography ==
=== Studio albums ===
Title	Album details	Peak chart positions
Title	Album details	US
Tané Cain	Released: 1982; Label: RCA; Format: LP	121

=== Singles ===
Title	Year	Peak chart positions	Album
Title	Year	US	Album
"Danger Zone"	1982	—	Tané Cain
"Holdin' On"	1982	37	Tané Cain
"My Time to Fly"	1982	108	Tané Cain
"—" denotes release that did not chart.

=== Soundtrack appearances ===
- "You Can't Do That", "Burnin' in the Third Degree", "Photoplay" (from The Terminator) (1984)
- "Kicks" (from Armed Response)

== Filmography ==
- Crawlspace (1986)
- Zombie Death House (1987)
- Death Spa (1987)
- Commando Squad (1987)
- Hot under the Collar (1991)
- Bikini Drive-In (1995)
- The Heavy Petting Detective (1995)
- Midnight Tease II (1995)
- Lap Dancing (1995)
- Target of Seduction (1995)
- Night Visions (1995)
- Married People, Single Sex 2: For Better or Worse (1995)
- Caged Hearts (1995)
- Bikini Academy (1996)
- Sexual Roulette (1996)
- Lovers, Liars and Thieves (1996)
- Stripshow (1996)
- Scorned 2 (1997)
- Illicit Dreams 2 (1997)
- Inferno (1997) (also Operation Cobra)
- Sweetheart Murders (1998)
- Fear and Loathing in Las Vegas (1998)
- Go (1999)
- Bare Deception (2000)
- Cruel Intentions 2 (2000)
- You Shouldn't Kiss Me Like This music video (2000)
- Legally Blonde (2001)
- Legally Blonde 2: Red, White & Blonde (2003)
- Customer of the Week (2005)
- Revamped (2007)
- Section B (2007)
- The Hard Ride (2008)
