= House Calls (TV series) =

American television series

- Wayne Rogers & Lynn Redgrave
- Genre: Sitcom
- Directed by: Hy Averback; John Clark
- Starring: Wayne Rogers; Lynn Redgrave; Sharon Gless; David Wayne; Ray Buktenica
- Country of origin: United States
- Original language: English
- No. of seasons: 3
- No. of episodes: 57 (list of episodes)

Production
- Producers: Sheldon Keller; Jerry Davis
- Running time: 22–24 minutes
- Production companies: Alex Winitsky-Arlene Sellers Productions; Universal Television

Original release
- Network: CBS
- Release: December 17, 1979 – September 6, 1982

House Calls is an American sitcom that lasted three seasons and 57 episodes, from December 17, 1979, to September 6, 1982, on CBS television, produced by Universal Television and based upon the 1978 feature film of the same title.

The series starred Wayne Rogers, Lynn Redgrave and Candice Azzara.

== Synopsis ==
British-born Ann Anderson (Lynn Redgrave), as hospital administrator, had three unruly doctors with whom to cope, and the comedy arose from their interactions. Dr. Charley Michaels (Wayne Rogers) became the main problem for her, because of the romantic angle. She always pulled herself up short just before falling hopelessly in love with him. Dr. Solomon (Ray Buktenica) was junior to Dr. Michaels and was his pal, and he would counterbalance Dr. Michaels's headstrong ways, almost a double act, but elderly Dr. Weatherby (David Wayne) was senior to them all, close to retirement, and with a mean streak, which meant that the others were often taking a rise out of the old fellow. The best he could do was to irritate Solomon by constantly getting his name wrong while going his own way.

Other characters who were part of the series were Head Nurse Bradley (Aneta Corsaut), a sympathetic and level-headed influence, Mrs. Phipps (Deedy Peters), a somewhat over-the-hill but enthusiastic candystriper, always forcing her good intentions upon unwilling patients, and Conrad Peckler (Mark L. Taylor), who was brought in as the arch villain of the piece to bring order to the hospital, hated by all.

Ann abruptly returned to England (because Redgrave was fired by the producers) after the eighth episode of season three; her replacement was Jane Jeffries (Sharon Gless), who had a similar love/hate relationship with Dr. Michaels for the final few episodes of the series.

== Controversy and cancellation ==
Lynn Redgrave was fired from the series following the birth of her new child. She insisted on bringing her daughter to work, in part, because she wanted to be able to breastfeed the baby on schedule, but this was interpreted by the studio as holding out for more money, while being disruptive to shooting requirements. Redgrave sued Universal for breaking her existing contract, but was not rehired, and the suit was dismissed several years later.

The breast-feeding controversy was later spoofed on Second City Television in a sketch, "Wet Nurse", with Andrea Martin playing Redgrave as a nurse with gigantic breasts solving several crises at a hospital.

Universal replaced Redgrave with Sharon Gless, who was then under a 10-year contract with Universal. The show's previously excellent ratings suffered from the abrupt and clumsily handled transition (Ann announced her departure in a letter read out loud by Charley), and the series was cancelled by early 1982, despite still finishing the season in the top 25. Gless subsequently in 1982 was one of the stars of Cagney & Lacey which ran for seven seasons.

== Episodes ==
Season	Episodes	Originally released		Rank	Rating
Season	Episodes	First released	Last released	Rank	Rating
1	13	December 17, 1979	March 17, 1980	14	22.1 (Tied with Real People)
2	20	November 17, 1980	April 13, 1981	8	22.4 (Tied with Three's Company)
3	24	November 2, 1981	September 6, 1982	23	19.2

== Awards and nominations ==
Redgrave was nominated for an Emmy for Outstanding Lead Actress in a Comedy Series in 1981, and Wayne Rogers and she were nominated for Golden Globes.
