= The Two of Us (play) =

1970 play written by Michael Frayn

The Two of Us is a 1970 play by British playwright Michael Frayn. It consists of four one-act plays for two actors and is Frayn's first published play. It was first performed at the Garrick Theatre by Richard Briers and Lynn Redgrave.

The four plays that make up The Two of Us are:

- Black and Silver: A night in the life of a young married couple on holiday with a new baby. This was originally written for a season of one-act plays by various authors, for which it was not accepted; Frayn then wrote the remaining plays in order to create his own season of one-act plays. They were
- The New Quixote: An eccentric young man pursues a relationship with an older woman who met him at a party where she got inebriated. When she finds him at her door the next morning she wants nothing more of him.
- Mr Foot: An Englishman seems to have formed a better relationship with his twitching foot than with his somewhat envious wife.
- Chinamen: A farce about a catastrophic dinner party, in which the two actors play all of the characters. (The host of the party remarks, early in the piece, that he has trouble telling his typical English friends apart, comparing them to the proverbial Chinamen that all supposedly look alike.) The play is a tour-de-force, with the two actors changing costumes and assuming new roles without apparent effort. Frayn considered the frantic backstage activity funnier than the play itself, which inspired his very successful play Noises Off.

Lynn Redgrave and John Clark later optioned The Two of Us for a successful 1975 coast-to-coast United States tour. Unable to find one actor willing and able to play all the male parts, director Clark settled for three actors. For The New Quixote he had cast a black actor to increase the woman's dilemma, but when the play reached Elitch Gardens in Denver, the theatre producer refused to let the play go on unless the part was recast with a white actor. The same refusal was repeated throughout the tour.
