= Holdin' On (Tane Cain song) =

Single by Tane Cain

from the album Tane Cain
- B-side: "Hurtin' Kind"
- Released: 1982
- Genre: Rock
- Length: 3:19
- Label: RCA
- Songwriters: Jonathan Cain; Pug Baker
- Producers: Jonathan Cain; Keith Olsen

Tane Cain singles chronology
"My Time To Fly" (1982)	"Holdin' On" (1982)	"My Time To Fly (re-release)" (1983)

Audio
- "Holdin' On" on YouTube

"Holdin' On" is a song by the American singer Tane Cain from her self-titled 1982 debut album. The song reached No. 37 on the Billboard Hot 100, her only top 40 song. Author Wayne Jancik included the song in his book The Billboard Book of One-Hit Wonders.

== Music video ==
The music video features Tane Cain strutting by wind machines before playing with her band which featured her then-husband Jonathan Cain.

== Charts ==
Chart (1982)	Peak position
US Billboard Hot 100	37
