= Shakespeare for My Father =

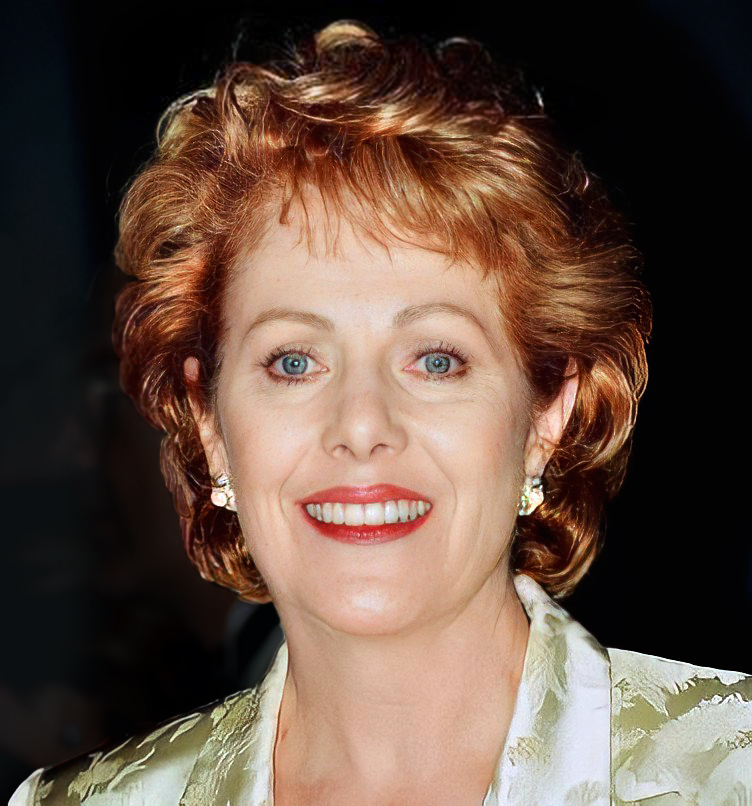
Writer and star Lynn Redgrave.

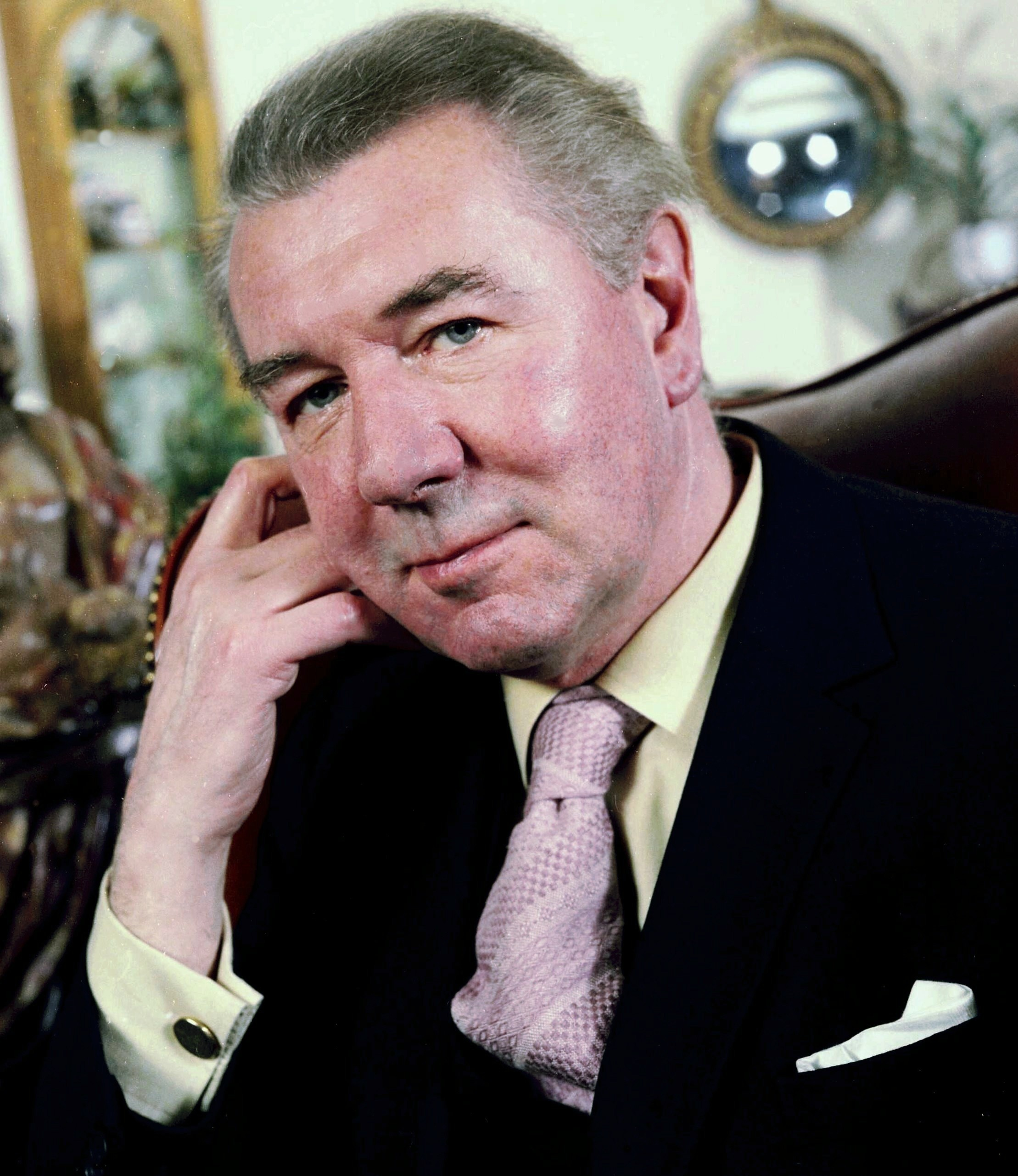
The father and play subject, Sir Michael Redgrave.

Shakespeare for My Father is a one-woman play written and performed by Lynn Redgrave. The play concerns Redgrave's relationship with her father, the imposing actor and family patriarch Michael Redgrave. The play was produced and directed by Redgrave's then husband John Clark with lighting designed by Thomas Skelton. It was presented for a week at the Lobero Theatre in Santa Barbara, California and then toured the United States for a year in a production sponsored by CAMI.

== Plot ==
Redgrave was a shy, somewhat sickly child who saw little of her busy father when growing up. She lived in a fantasy world, and her daydreams, because of watching her father perform, consisted largely of Shakespearean plays and characters. The "memory and message" play gave her an opportunity to slip into many of the characters, following her father's life through to his death from Parkinson's disease, and to forgive his failure as a parent.

== Reception ==
The play opened on Broadway at the Helen Hayes Theatre in the 1992–1993 season, where it played 274 performances, earned Redgrave a Best Actress Tony Award nomination, and went on to play in Canada, Australia, and London's Haymarket Theatre.

The play received significant critical acclaim. New York Magazine described Shakespeare for my Father as "a one-woman show by Lynn Redgrave in which she reminisces about life with her father, Sir Michael Redgrave, with full scenes from Shakespeare's works", and stated that Redgrave's "sense of humor makes it a pleasure and privilege to watch". Patti Hartigan of The Boston Globe described the play as a "triumph", and Lloyd Rose of The Washington Post wrote of redgrave: "Particularly when she is not speaking, her face can seem to hold an impossible number of emotions simultaneously, yet such fullness of feeling is mysteriously unreadable. At such moments you glance up to Sir Michael's picture, which dominates the stage, and find the same." Variety described Redgrave's performance as "brilliant and extremely moving" and said, "At the end, Lynn gestures to that photograph, sharing her well-deserved applause with the man who could never acknowledge her talent. It’s a simple gesture that contains layers of emotional complexity and as such, an appropriate way to end this brutally honest but forgiveness-filled show."
