= Lynn Redgrave =

British and American actress (1943–2010)

Lynn Redgrave OBE
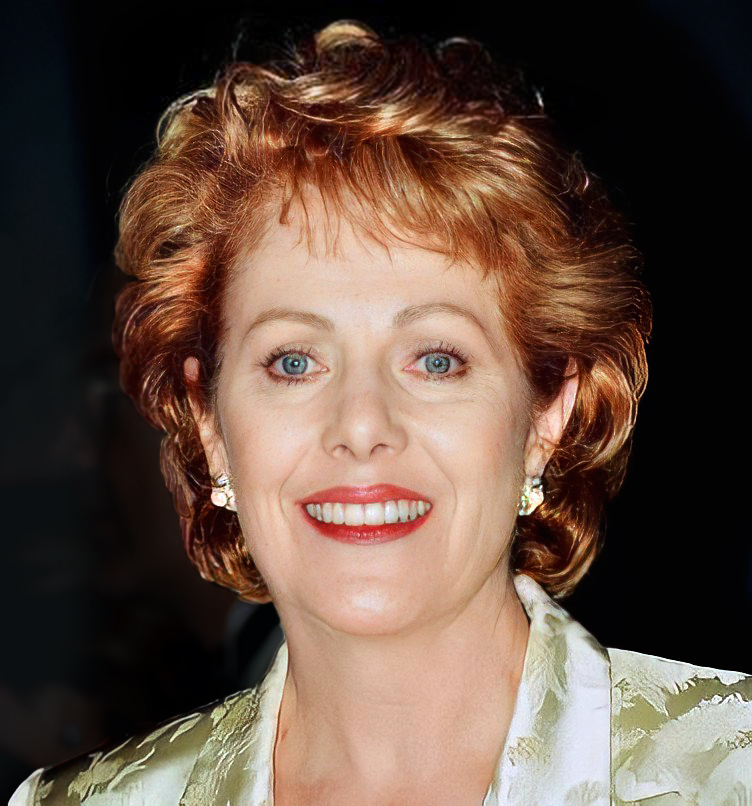
- Redgrave in 1999
- Born: Lynn Rachel Redgrave; 8 March 1943; Marylebone, London, England
- Died: 2 May 2010 (aged 67); Kent, Connecticut, US
- Resting place: St. Peter's Episcopal Cemetery; Lithgow, New York, US
- Citizenship: United Kingdom; United States
- Education: Royal Central School of Speech and Drama
- Occupation: Actress
- Years active: 1962–2010
- Spouse: John Clark (m. 1967; div. 2000)
- Children: 3
- Parents: Sir Michael Redgrave; Rachel Kempson
- Family: Redgrave
- Website: www.redgrave.com

Lynn Rachel Redgrave (8 March 1943 – 2 May 2010) was a British and American actress. During a career that spanned five decades, she won two Golden Globe Awards and was nominated for two Academy Awards, four British Academy Film Awards, two Emmy Awards, two Screen Actors Guild Awards, three Tony Awards, and a Grammy Award.

A member of the Redgrave family of actors, Lynn trained in London before making her theatrical debut in 1962. By the mid-1960s, she had appeared in several films, including Tom Jones (1963) and Georgy Girl (1966), which won her a New York Film Critics Circle Award and a Golden Globe Award for Best Actress in a Musical/Comedy, as well as earning her a nomination for the Academy Award for Best Actress.

Redgrave made her Broadway debut in 1967 and performed in several stage productions in New York City while making frequent returns to London's West End. She performed with her sister Vanessa in Three Sisters in London and in the title role of Baby Jane Hudson in a television production of What Ever Happened to Baby Jane? in 1991.

Redgrave made a return to cinema in the late 1990s, in films such as Shine (1996) and Gods and Monsters (1998), for which she received her second Academy Award nomination and won a Golden Globe Award for Best Supporting Actress. As of 2025, Lynn Redgrave is one of only two people to have been nominated for all of the 'Big Four' American entertainment awards (Emmy, Grammy, Oscar and Tony, collectively known when all four have been won as "EGOT") without winning any of them.

== Early life and theatrical family ==
Redgrave was born on 8 March 1943, in Marylebone, London, as the youngest child of actors Sir Michael Redgrave and Rachel Kempson. Her siblings included actress Vanessa Redgrave and actor/political activist Corin Redgrave. Redgrave was also the aunt of writer/director Carlo Gabriel Nero and actresses Joely Richardson, Jemma Redgrave, and Natasha Richardson, and the sister-in-law of director Tony Richardson, actress Kika Markham, and Italian actor Franco Nero. Her grandfather was silent screen leading man Roy Redgrave.

Redgrave attended Queen's Gate School in London, where she initially trained to become a professional show jumper. However, Redgrave left the school in 1959 and later studied at the Royal Central School of Speech and Drama in London.

== Career ==
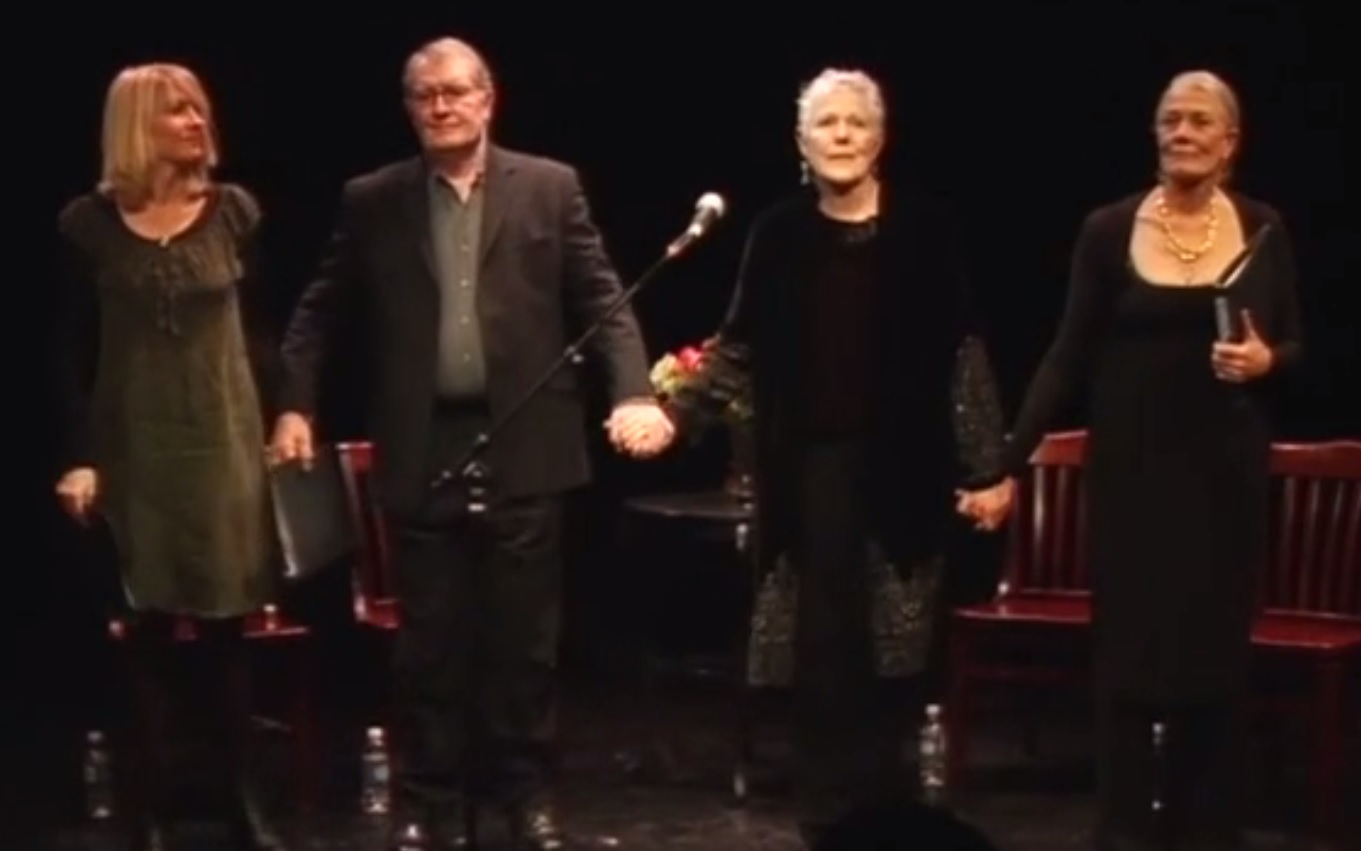
Redgrave family (l. to r. Jemma, Corin, Lynn and Vanessa Redgrave) bowing after reading "Poems from Guantánamo: The Detainees Speak"

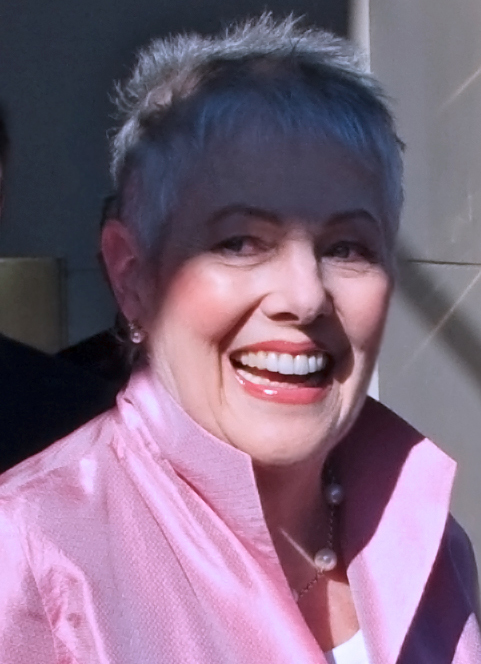
Redgrave at the 2009 Toronto International Film Festival

After training at London's Royal Central School of Speech and Drama, Redgrave made her professional debut in a 1962 production of A Midsummer Night's Dream at the Royal Court Theatre. Following a tour of Billy Liar and repertory work in Dundee, Redgrave made her West End debut at the Haymarket, in N. C. Hunter's The Tulip Tree with Celia Johnson and John Clements.

Redgrave was invited to join the National Theatre for its inaugural season at the Old Vic, working with such directors as Laurence Olivier, Franco Zeffirelli and Noël Coward in roles like Rose in The Recruiting Officer, Barblin in Andorra, Jackie in Hay Fever, Kattrin in Mother Courage, Miss Prue in Love for Love and Margaret in Much Ado About Nothing, which kept her busy for the next three years. During that time, Redgrave appeared in films such as Tom Jones (1963), Girl with Green Eyes (1964), The Deadly Affair (1966), and the title role in Georgy Girl (also 1966, and which featured her mother, Rachel Kempson). For the last of these roles, she gained the New York Film Critics Circle Award, the Golden Globe and an Oscar nomination. In 1967, Redgrave made her Broadway debut in Black Comedy with Michael Crawford and Geraldine Page. London appearances included Michael Frayn's The Two of Us with Richard Briers at the Garrick, David Hare's Slag at the Royal Court and Born Yesterday, directed by Tom Stoppard at Greenwich in 1973.

Redgrave returned to Broadway in 1974, in My Fat Friend. There soon followed Knock Knock with Charles Durning, Mrs. Warren's Profession (for a Tony nomination) with Ruth Gordon and Saint Joan. During the 1985–86 season, she appeared with Rex Harrison, Claudette Colbert and Jeremy Brett in Aren't We All?, and with Mary Tyler Moore in A. R. Gurney's Sweet Sue. In 1983, Redgrave played Cleopatra in an American television version of Antony and Cleopatra opposite Timothy Dalton. She was in Misalliance in Chicago with Irene Worth (earning the Sarah Siddons and Joseph Jefferson awards), Twelfth Night at the American Shakespeare Festival, California Suite, The King and I, Hellzapoppin', Les Dames du Jeudi, Les Liaisons Dangereuses and The Cherry Orchard. In 1988, Redgrave narrated a dramatised television documentary, Silent Mouse, which told the story of the creation of the Christmas carol Silent Night. She starred with Stewart Granger and Ricardo Montalbán in a Hollywood production of Don Juan in Hell in the early winter of 1991.

With her sister Vanessa as Olga, Redgrave returned to the London stage playing Masha in Three Sisters in 1991 at the Queen's Theatre, London, and later played the title role in a television production of Whatever Happened to Baby Jane? again with her sister. Highlights of Redgrave's early film career also include The National Health, Everything You Always Wanted to Know About Sex* (*But Were Afraid to Ask), The Happy Hooker and Getting It Right. In the United States, she was seen in such television series as Teachers Only, House Calls, Centennial and Chicken Soup. Redgrave also starred in BBC productions such as The Faint-Hearted Feminist, A Woman Alone, Death of a Son, Calling the Shots and Fighting Back. She played Broadway again in Moon Over Buffalo (1996) with co-star Robert Goulet and starred in the world premiere of Tennessee Williams' The Notebook of Trigorin, based on Anton Chekhov's The Seagull. Redgrave won the Drama Desk Award for Outstanding Featured Actress in a Play for her performance in Talking Heads.

Redgrave became well-known in the United States after appearing in the television series House Calls, for which she received an Emmy nomination. Redgrave was fired from the series after she insisted on bringing her child to rehearsals so as to continue a breastfeeding schedule. A lawsuit ensued but was dismissed a few years later. Following that, Redgrave appeared in a long-running series of television commercials for H. J. Heinz Company, then the manufacturer of the weight loss foods for Weight Watchers, a Heinz subsidiary. Her signature line for the ads was "This Is Living, Not Dieting!" Redgrave wrote a book of her life experiences with the same title, which included a selection of Weight Watchers recipes. The autobiographical section later became the basis of her one-woman play Shakespeare for My Father.

In 1989, Redgrave appeared on Broadway in Love Letters with her husband John Clark, and thereafter they performed the play around the country, on one occasion for the jury in the O. J. Simpson case. In 1993, Redgrave appeared on Broadway in the one-woman play Shakespeare for My Father, which Clark produced and directed. She was nominated for the Tony Award for Best Actress in a Play. In 1993, Redgrave was elected president of the Players' Club.

In 2005, Redgrave appeared at Quinnipiac University and Connecticut College in the play Sisters of the Garden, about the sisters Fanny and Rebekka Mendelssohn and Nadia and Lili Boulanger. She was also reported to be writing a one-woman play about her battle with breast cancer and her 2003 mastectomy, based on her book Journal: A Mother and Daughter's Recovery from Breast Cancer with photos by her daughter Annabel and text by Redgrave herself.

In September 2006, Redgrave appeared in Nightingale, the U.S. premiere of her new one-woman play based upon her maternal grandmother Beatrice, at Los Angeles' Mark Taper Forum. Redgrave also performed the play in May 2007 at Hartford Stage in Hartford, Connecticut. In 2007, she appeared in an episode of Desperate Housewives as Dahlia Hainsworth, the mother of Susan Delfino's boyfriend Ian Hainsworth.

In 2009, Redgrave was inducted into the American Theatre Hall of Fame.

=== Voice work ===
Redgrave narrated approximately 20 audiobooks, including Prince Caspian: The Chronicles of Narnia by C. S. Lewis for Harper Audio and Inkheart by Cornelia Funke for Listening Library.

== Personal life ==
On 2 April 1967, Lynn Redgrave married actor John Clark. Together they had three children. Her marriage to Clark was dissolved in 2000, two years after he revealed that he had had an affair with her personal assistant, and that Lynn's supposed grandson was in fact Clark's own son by the personal assistant, who had married (and subsequently divorced) Clark and Redgrave's son. The divorce proceedings were acrimonious and became front-page news, with Clark alleging that Redgrave had also been unfaithful.

On 5 January 1998, Redgrave became a naturalised citizen of the United States.

Redgrave was appointed an Officer of the Order of the British Empire (OBE) in the 2002 New Year Honours for services to acting and the cinema and to the British community in Los Angeles.

== Death ==
Redgrave discussed her health problems associated with bulimia and breast cancer. Redgrave was diagnosed with breast cancer in December 2002 and had a mastectomy in January 2003 and underwent chemotherapy. She ultimately died from the cancer at her home in Kent, Connecticut, on 2 May 2010, aged 67.

Redgrave's funeral was held on 8 May 2010 at the First Congregational Church in Kent. She was interred in St Peter's Episcopal Cemetery in the hamlet of Lithgow, New York, where her mother Rachel Kempson and her niece Natasha Richardson are also interred.

In 2012, the Folger Shakespeare Library acquired Redgrave's collection of personal papers and photographs.

== Legacy ==
In 2001, Redgrave received a LIVING LEGEND honour at The WINFemme Film Festival and The Women's Network Image Awards.

In 2013, the Bleecker Street Theater (Off-Broadway) was renamed the Lynn Redgrave Theater.

== Filmography ==
=== Film ===
Year	Title	Role	Notes
1960	Shoot to Kill	Minor Role	Uncredited
1963	Tom Jones	Susan	
1964	Girl with Green Eyes	Baba Brennan	
1966	Georgy Girl	Georgy	
1966	The Family Way		Uncredited
1967	The Deadly Affair	Virgin	
1967	Smashing Time	Yvonne	
1969	The Virgin Soldiers	Phillipa Raskin	
1970	Last of the Mobile Hot Shots	Myrtle Kane	
1971	Long Live Your Death	Mary O'Donnell	AKA, Don't Turn the Other Cheek!
1972	Every Little Crook and Nanny	Miss Poole	
1972	Everything You Always Wanted to Know About Sex* (*But Were Afraid to Ask)	The Queen	
1973	The National Health	Nurse Betty Martin	
1975	The Happy Hooker	Xaviera Hollander	
1976	The Big Bus	Camille Levy	
1980	Sunday Lovers	Lady Davina	(segment "An Englishman's Home")
1987	Morgan Stewart's Coming Home	Nancy Stewart	
1989	Getting It Right	Joan	
1989	Midnight	Midnight	
1990	The Great American Sex Scandal	Abby Greyhouwsky	
1996	Shine	Gillian	
1998	Gods and Monsters	Hanna	
1998	The Hairy Bird	Miss McVane	AKA, All I Wanna Do
1999	Touched	Carrie	
1999	The Annihilation of Fish	Poinsettia	
2000	The Simian Line	Katharine	
2000	The Next Best Thing	Helen Whittaker	
2000	Deeply	Celia	
2000	How to Kill Your Neighbor's Dog	Edna	
2000	Lion of Oz	Wicked Witch of the East	Voice
2001	Venus and Mars	Emily Vogel	
2001	My Kingdom	Mandy	
2002	Spider	Mrs. Wilkinson	
2002	Unconditional Love	Nola Fox	
2002	The Wild Thornberrys Movie	Cordelia Thornberry	Voice
2002	Hansel and Gretel	Woman / Witch	
2002	Anita and Me	Mrs. Ormerod	
2003	Charlie's War	Grandma Lewis	
2003	Peter Pan	Aunt Millicent	
2004	Kinsey	Final Interview Subject	
2005	The White Countess	Olga Belinskya	
2007	The Jane Austen Book Club	Mama Sky	
2009	Confessions of a Shopaholic	Drunken Lady at Ball	
2009	My Dog Tulip	Nancy / Greengrocer's Wife	Voice

=== Television ===
Year	Title	Role	Notes
1965	Sunday Out of Season	Elaine	TV film
1966	Comedy Playhouse	Sheila	Episode: "The End of the Tunnel"
1966	Love Story	Rosemarie	Episode: "Ain't Afraid to Dance"
1966	Armchair Theatre	Polly Barlow	Episode: "Pretty Polly"
1967	Armchair Theatre	Ivy Toft; Caroline	Episode: "I Am Osango"; Episode: "What's Wrong with Humpty Dumpty?"
1968	Love Story	Mary Downey	Episode: "The Egg on the Face of the Tiger"
1971	Play of the Month	Helena	Episode: "A Midsummer Night's Dream"
1973	Play of the Month	Eliza Doolittle	Episode: "Pygmalion"
1974	Vienna 1900	Berta Garlan	Episode: "The Spring Sonata"
1974	The Turn of the Screw	Miss Jane Cubberly	TV film
1976	Kojak	Claire	Episode: "A Hair-Trigger Away"
1978	Disco Beaver from Outer Space	Dr. Van Helsing	TV film
1978–1979	Centennial	Charlotte Buckland Seccombe	TV miniseries
1979	Sooner or Later	The teacher	TV film
1979	Beggarman, Thief	Kate Jordache	TV miniseries
1979	The Muppet Show	Herself	Episode: "Lynn Redgrave"
1979–1981	House Calls	Ann Anderson	Main role (41 episodes)
1980	Gauguin the Savage	Mette Gad	TV film
1980	The Seduction of Miss Leona	Miss Leona de Vose	TV film
1982	Rehearsal for Murder	Monica Welles	TV film
1982	CBS Schoolbreak Special	Sarah Cotter	Episode: "The Shooting"
1982	The Love Boat	Patti White	1 episode
1982–1983	Teachers Only	Diana Swanson	Main role (21 episodes)
1983	Hotel	Cathy Knight	Episode: "Relative Loss"
1984	Antony and Cleopatra	Cleopatra	TV film
1984	Fantasy Island	Kristen Robbins	1 episode
1984	The Fainthearted Feminist	Martha	TV series
1984	Murder, She Wrote	Abby Benton Freestone	Episode: "It's a Dog's Life"
1985	The Bad Seed	Monica Breedlove	TV film
1986	My Two Loves	Marjorie Lloyd	TV film
1986	Hotel	Audrey Beck	Episode: "Restless Nights"
1988	A Woman Alone	The Woman	TV film
1989	Screen Two	Pauline Williams	Episode: "Death of a Son"
1989	Chicken Soup	Maddie Peerce	Main role (12 episodes)
1990	Silent Mouse	Narrator	TV film
1990	The Great American Sex Scandal	Abby Greyhouwsky	TV film
1991	What Ever Happened to Baby Jane?	Jane Hudson	TV film
1993	Calling the Shots	Maggie Donnelly	
1997	Toothless	Rogers	TV film
1997	Indefensible: The Truth About Edward Brannigan	Monica Brannigan	TV film
1998	White Lies	Inga Kolneder	TV film
1998–2001	Rude Awakening	Trudy Frank	Main role (55 episodes)
1999	The Nanny	Herself	Episode: "The Yummy Mummy"
1999	Different	Amanda Talmadge	TV film
1999	A Season for Miracles	Hon. Judge Nancy Jakes	TV film
2001	Varian's War	Alma Werfel-Mahler	TV film
2002	My Sister's Keeper	Helen Margaret Chapman	TV film
2003	The Wild Thornberrys	Cordelia Thornberry	Voice, Episodes: "Sir Nigel: Parts 1 & 2"
2006–2007	Eloise: The Animated Series	Nanny	Voice, Regular role (6 episodes)
2007	Desperate Housewives	Dahlia Hainsworth	Episode: "Dress Big"
2007	Nurses	Peggy Rice	TV film
2009	Law & Order: Criminal Intent	Emily Huntford	Episode: "Folie a Deux"
2009	Ugly Betty	Olivia Guillemette	Episode: "The Butterfly Effect: Part 1"

== Theatre ==
Year	Title	Role	House	Notes
1962	A Midsummer Night's Dream	Helena	Royal Court	
1962	Billy Liar		Dundee	
1962	The Tulip Tree		Haymarket	
1963	The Recruiting Officer	Rose	National	
1963	Andorra	Barblin	National	
1963	Hamlet			
1964	Hay Fever	Jackie	National	
1965	Much Ado About Nothing	Margaret	National	
1965–1966	Love for Love			
1967	Black Comedy / The White Liars	Carol Melkett	National	
1970	The Two of Us			
1971	Slag			
1974	My Fat Friend	Vicky		
1976	Mrs. Warren's Profession	Vivie Warren		
1976	Knock Knock	Joan		Replacement
1976	Misalliance			
1977–1978	Saint Joan	Joan		
1985	Aren't We All?	Hon. Mrs. W. Tatham		
1987	Sweet Sue	Susan Too		
1989–1990	Love Letters	Melissa Gardner		Replacement
1992	A Little Hotel on the Side	Angelique Pinglet		
1992	The Master Builder	Mrs. Aline Solness		
1993–1994	Shakespeare for My Father	Performer		
1995–1996	Moon Over Buffalo	Charlotte Hay		Replacement
2001	Noises Off			
2002	Company	Joanne		
2005	The Constant Wife	Mrs. Culver		
2006	The Lost Colony	Queen Elizabeth I	Waterside Theatre at Fort Raleigh	
2009	The Importance of Being Earnest	Lady Bracknell	Touring	

== Awards and nominations ==
Awards
Year	Award	Category	Production	Result	Ref.
1965	18th British Academy Film Awards	Most Promising Newcomer to Leading Film Roles	Girl with Green Eyes	Nominated	
1966	32nd New York Film Critics Circle Awards	Best Actress	Georgy Girl (tied with Elizabeth Taylor for Who's Afraid of Virginia Woolf?)	Won	
1967	20th British Academy Film Awards	Best British Actress	Georgy Girl	Nominated	
1967	24th Golden Globe Awards	Best Actress in a Motion Picture – Musical or Comedy	Georgy Girl	Won	
1967	24th Golden Globe Awards	New Star of the Year – Actress	Georgy Girl	Nominated	
1967	39th Academy Awards	Best Actress	Georgy Girl	Nominated	
1967	Laurel Awards	Female New Face		Nominated	
1968	Kansas City Film Critics Circle Awards	Best Actress	Georgy Girl (tied with Vanessa Redgrave for Camelot)	Won	
1976	30th Tony Awards	Best Actress in a Play	Mrs. Warren's Profession	Nominated	
1981	38th Golden Globe Awards	Best Actress – Television Series Musical or Comedy	House Calls	Nominated	
1981	33rd Primetime Emmy Awards	Outstanding Lead Actress in a Comedy Series	House Calls	Nominated	
1983	Daytime Emmy Awards	Outstanding Performer in Children's Programming	CBS Afternoon Playhouse	Nominated	
1993	47th Tony Awards	Best Actress in a Play	Shakespeare for My Father	Nominated	
1997	50th British Academy Film Awards	Best Actress in a Supporting Role	Shine	Nominated	
1997	3rd Screen Actors Guild Awards	Outstanding Performance by a Cast in a Motion Picture	Shine	Nominated	
1998	13th Gemini Awards	Best Performance by an Actress in a Supporting Role in a Dramatic Program or Miniseries	White Lies	Nominated	
1999	3rd Golden Satellite Awards	Best Actress in a Supporting Role	Gods and Monsters	Nominated	
1999	5th Screen Actors Guild Awards	Outstanding Performance by a Female Actor in a Supporting Role	Gods and Monsters	Nominated	
1999	52nd British Academy Film Awards	Best Actress in a Supporting Role	Gods and Monsters	Nominated	
1999	14th Independent Spirit Awards	Best Supporting Female	Gods and Monsters	Won	
1999	71st Academy Awards	Best Supporting Actress	Gods and Monsters	Nominated	
1999	56th Golden Globe Awards	Best Supporting Actress – Motion Picture	Gods and Monsters	Won	
2000	20th London Film Critics Circle Awards	British Supporting Actress of the Year	Gods and Monsters	Won	
2003	Palm Springs International Film Festival	Career Achievement Award		Won	
2006	Los Angeles Drama Critics Circle Awards	Best Solo Performance	Nightingale	Won	
2006	60th Tony Awards	Best Actress in a Play	The Constant Wife	Nominated	
2007	49th Annual Grammy Awards	Best Spoken Word Album for Children	The Witches	Nominated	

== See also ==
- List of British actors
- List of Academy Award winners and nominees from Great Britain
- List of actors with Academy Award nominations
- List of actors with more than one Academy Award nomination in the acting categories
- List of Golden Globe winners
