= Thomas R. Skelton =

American lighting designer

Thomas R. Skelton (September 24, 1927 – August 9, 1994) was an American lighting designer. In a career spanning more than four decades, he was best known for his lighting designs for ballet and Broadway theatre productions.

== Biography ==
Born in North Bridgeton, Maine, Skelton graduated from Middlebury College, Theatre Department. He pursued an interest in modern dance after moving to New York, studying dance with Martha Graham and José Limón. His lighting career started as an apprentice to Jean Rosenthal at the American Dance Festival. He worked for Robert Joffrey's new dance company as a lighting designer and stage manager.

By the 1950s he was published regularly in Dance Magazine with his lighting methods. He taught at both Yale University and New York Studio and Forum of Stage Design.

Most of his work was within the world of dance, particularly ballet. He designed lighting for, among others, the American Ballet Theatre, The Joffrey Ballet, the New York City Ballet and the Ohio Ballet, for which he was associate director. His method was published as 'The Handbook for Dance Stagecraft' between October 1955 and December 1956 in Dance Magazine.

He also designed lighting for some 63 Broadway productions, beginning with Oh Dad, Poor Dad, Mamma's Hung You in the Closet and I'm Feelin' So Sad in 1963 until his last production in 1993, Shakespeare For My Father. He also designed lighting for numerous productions at, among others, the Circle in the Square, Yale Repertory Theatre, and the American Shakespeare Festival. Skelton received three Tony Award nominations.

According to the New York Times: "Mr. Skelton was equally at home in two very different art forms. His lighting brought extra texture and body and jewel-like color to dance stages in an era when dance lighting usually emphasized airy, open space. His theater designs often added a feeling of light and air to a stage picture while strengthening the dramatic quality of a production."

== Work ==
Broadway (selected)

- Coco (1968)
- Indians (1970) Tony Award Best Lighting Design (Nominee)
- Guys and Dolls (1976)
- The King and I (1977)
- Gigi (1973)
- Purlie (1970)
- Shenandoah (1974)
- All God's Chillun Got Wings (1975) Tony Award Best Lighting Design (Nominee)
- A Matter of Gravity (1976)
- Legend (1976) Drama Desk Award Outstanding Lighting Design nominee
- Death of a Salesman (George C Scott) (1975)
- Death of a Salesman (Michael Rudman) (1984)
- Oklahoma! (1979)
- Peter Pan (1979)
- Brigadoon (1980)
- Lena Horne: The Lady and Her Music (1981) Drama Desk Award Outstanding Lighting Design nominee
- The Iceman Cometh (1985) Tony Award Best Lighting Design nominee
- Shakespeare For My Father (1993)

Ballet

- Jerome Robbins' Dances at a Gathering
- Robert Joffrey's Astarte
- Heinz Poll's Scenes From Childhood
- José Limón's The Moor's Pavane
- Paul Taylor's Aureole
- Martha Graham's Rite of Spring
- Kurt Jooss' The Green Table
- Gerald Arpino's Kettantanz
- Leonide Massine's Parade

== Sources ==
- Thomas R. Skelton. "Handbook of Dance Stagecraft." Dance Magazine. October 1955 to December 1956
- Lighting the Dance
