= Holiday Edition =

Canadian children's television series

- Genre: Children's television
- Country of origin: Canada
- Original language: English
- No. of seasons: 3

Production
- Producers: Paddy Sampson (1959); Denny Spence (1960-61)

Original release
- Network: CBC Television
- Release: 5 July 1959 – 24 September 1961

Related
- Junior Magazine

Holiday Edition is a Canadian children's television series that aired on CBC Television from 1959 to 1961.

== Premise ==
This series was mid-year replacement for Junior Magazine which featured interviews, animated shorts and film clips on various subjects.

The first season in 1959 was hosted by John Clark, accompanied by Hank Hedges (nature topics), Doug Maxwell (sports topics). The episode on 6 September 1959 featured a segment of water sports played by Samoan children, another segment featuring three boys travelling along the San Juan River, an animated short with Bongo the Bear, and a newsreel titled "This is Young Canada".

The second season in 1960 was co-hosted by Ross Snetsinger and Toby Tarnow. Magician Michael Roth also appeared. For example, the 4 September 1960 episode featured guest Michael Roth of the Federation of Ontario Naturalists to discuss activities of birds followed by short films "This is Young Canada" and "Asian Earth", the latter featuring a family from rural India. The 25 September 1960 episode featured a discussion of a new reptile gallery at the Royal Ontario Museum with guest Duncan Cameron.

The third, final season opened on 2 July 1961 with a folk music theme, featuring dancers and guest singers James McCarthy and Valerie Siren. The 9 July 1961 episode featured clips of Montreal's Dorval Airport, Prince Edward Island's Lobster Carnival and a Toronto judo class.

== Scheduling ==
This 30 to 60 minute series was broadcast on Sunday afternoons at various times:

Season	Dates	Time	Length
1959	5 July - 6 September	4:30 p.m.	60 minutes
1959	20 September - 3 October	3:00 p.m.	30 minutes
1960	3 July - 4 September	4:00 p.m.	30 minutes
1960	25 September - 2 October	3:00 p.m.	30 minutes
1961	2 July - 24 September 1961	4:00 p.m.	60 minutes
