= Junior Magazine =

- Also known as: Summer Magazine
- Presented by: John Clark
- Country of origin: Canada
- Original language: English
- No. of seasons: 7

Production
- Running time: 60 minutes

Original release
- Network: CBC Television
- Release: 1955 – 1962

Junior Magazine is a Canadian television program for teenagers that ran for seven years on CBC Television's coast to coast network, seen Sundays from 2-3 p.m.

Fred Rainsberry was largely responsible for running the Children's Television Department for the Canadian Broadcasting Corporation, out of their Jarvis Street studios in Toronto during the 1950s and '60s. The host was a recent arrival from England, John Clark, leaving behind his Just William image.

The series began in 1955, with Clark introducing short documentary films, and the format was expanded when co-hosts were brought in, Hank Hedges presenting nature subjects, and Doug Maxwell covering sports. Producer Bruce Attridge introduced a little culture to the program with music and dance sequences, and young Roberta Maxwell joined the team in 1957 for 2 years, before exiting to pursue an acting career. Disney selected the show to be their Canadian outlet for their children's films, and the program's objectives were expanded in 1958, when Clark would take off on weekly jaunts with a camera crew to explore the surrounding countryside and uncover points of historic interest. However, Clark never lost the acting bug, and left for New York in 1960. The program continued for two more years, under several new hosts, among them Toby Tarnow, Patrick Watson, Garrick Hagon, and Norman Welch. In 1963, Rainsberry persuaded Fred Rogers to take to the airwaves.

In 1957, 1958 and 1962, the series was continued from July to September with Summer Magazine. John Clark was again host for this 1957 variation of the regular Junior Magazine series, but by 1962 various other hosts were seen in this mid-year replacement.

From 1959 to 1961 its summer replacement was Holiday Edition.
