= New York Studio and Forum of Stage Design =

The Studio and Forum of Stage Design
- Former names: Lester Polakov Studio of Stage Design
- Established: 1958
- Founders: Lester Polakov

The Studio and Forum of Stage Design was an American training school for theatre designers that was started by scenic designer Lester Polakov in 1958 in the Greenwich Village neighborhood of the Manhattan borough of New York City, New York.

== History ==
Polakov was born in Chicago, Illinois, in 1916 and studied in New York with George Grosz and at Columbia University. He began his career designing sets in summer stock theatre and in 1939 made his debut in New York City as the scenic designer for The Mother. This was quickly followed in 1940 by designing the costumes for Reunion in New York, as well as assisting scenic designer Harry Horner on Lady in the Dark. After service in World War II, he resumed designing and also painting, with several exhibitions of his paintings as a result.

In 1958, he established the Lester Polakov Studio of Stage Design, later known as the Studio and Forum of Stage Design, where he employed some of the best-known designers of sets, lights, and costumes to teach design. In addition to teaching and overseeing the operation of the school, he continued to design sets and costumes for the stage.

In 1993, Polakov published his book, We Live to Paint Again.

In 1999, Polakov was the recipient of the Distinguished Achievement Award in Scenery presented to him by the United States Institute for Theatre Technology. His credits include Call Me Mister (1946, scenic design), Crime and Punishment (1947, costume design), The Member of the Wedding (1950, scenic, costume, and lighting design; also replacement stage manager), The Skin of Our Teeth (1955, scenic design), Great Day in the Morning (1962, scenic and lighting design), and Charlotte (1980, scenic design).

He was a scenic designer who, through his years of working in theatre, gathered together a group of like-minded designers to create a teaching environment that was esteemed, though it was not connected to any university or academic institution.

Through this school, and the corresponding work done by union members of United Scenic Artists l.u. 829 (now a part of the International Alliance of Theatrical Stage Employees), they created and promoted the idea of conceptual-based designing.

All the teachers in the school were working professionals, usually Broadway-based designers. The list included: Lester Polakov, John Gleason, Tom Skelton and Arden Fingerhut.

The school had courses that included scenic design, scenic painting, still-life sketching, costume design and lighting design.

Today, none of the original creators of this school survive.
