= Beverly Hills Bordello =

- Starring: Nicole Gian; Monique Parent; Gabriella Hall
- Country of origin: United States
- Original language: English
- No. of seasons: 2
- No. of episodes: 29

Production
- Running time: 30 min.
- Production companies: One Time Productions; MRG Entertainment

Original release
- Network: Showtime
- Release: February 1, 1996 – April 23, 1998

Beverly Hills Bordello is a softcore series aired on the Showtime premium cable channel. It was an anthology series that centered on the fictional Winston Spa located in Beverly Hills. The spa was a bordello run by Madam Veronica Winston.

The only recurring character was Veronica Winston, who was played interchangeably, though inexplicably, by three different actresses: Nicole Gian (season 1), Monique Parent (seasons 1–2) and Gabriella Hall (seasons 1–2).

== Episodes ==
=== Season 1 (1996) ===
No. overall	No. in season	Title	Directed by	Written by	Original release date
1	1	"Teach Me"	Robert Angelo	Mushina Bezimyani	February 1, 1996
With their relationship in trouble because their love life lacks their old spark, a couple visits the Winston Spa and gain a new understanding of each other.
2	2	"Forbidden Fruit"	Robert Angelo	Gilbert Alan & Adam Kayn	February 8, 1996
A woman, successful in business, yearns for personal fulfillment, but she finds that the men in her life only see her as a means for career advancement. On a friend's recommendation, she visits Madam Victoria Winston at the Beverly Hills Bordello where she meets a man who appreciates her for her beauty and brains.
3	3	"The Boyfriend"	Robert Angelo	George Ayvas	February 15, 1996
Frank, angered when he discovers that his new girlfriend Linda works for Madame Winston, starts an argument which causes Linda to leave him. With his hat in his hand, he goes to the spa to apologize, but Linda rejects him so he hires another girl, which helps Linda to understand his feelings.
4	4	"The Lieutenant"	Robert Angelo	Robert Angelo	February 22, 1996
A corrupt police officer uses his badge to blackmail Veronica into making her bordello and employees available to him at no cost. The Madam comes up with a plan to put him in his place.
5	5	"Reunion"	Robert Angelo	Robert Angelo	February 29, 1996
Jack finds his secret high school crush, Missy, working at Winston Mansion and confesses his long held feelings.
6	6	"Girlfriends"	Jon Burroughs	Jon Burroughs	March 7, 1996
Girl talk takes an erotic turn when Jane, Allison, Tracy and Nancy compare notes and reveal their innermost fantasies to and of each other.
7	7	"Exchange Program"	Jon Burroughs	Laura Francis	March 14, 1996
A Latina Call girl provides and eye-opening education when the establishment joins a foreign exchange program.
8	8	"Drawing the Line"	Robert Angelo	George Ayvas	March 21, 1996
When a veteran call girl finds out that she is losing the business from her regular clients to younger women she decides it's time to get out of the business, but not until she pulls one last trick.
9	9	"Taboo"	Jon Burroughs	Jon Burroughs	March 28, 1996
When Jennifer finds herself having erotic fantasies about a female co-worker, she seeks advice from the Beverly Hills Bordello's on-line service and gets some friendly advice.
10	10	"Better Than the Couch"	Robert Angelo	Gilbert Alan & Adam Kayn	April 4, 1996
When his wife leaves him, John creates a fantasy life with a loving wife and an equally passionate lover. Needing fulfillment for his fantasies, John goes to the Beverly Hill Bordello. When John tells his therapist about his fantasy and reality experiences, the psychiatrist is drawn in the fantasy and goes to the spa himself.
11	11	"Use Your Imagination"	Michelle Gardner	Michelle Gardner	April 11, 1996
An Amorous couple act out a passionate fantasy of meeting in a bordello.
12	12	"Silence Is Golden"	Robert Angelo	D. Alvelo	April 18, 1996
A call girl is puzzled by the behavior of one of her customers who never speaks when they are together and seeks help in finding out why he behaves so strangely.
13	13	"Wish List"	Robert Angelo	Robert Angelo	April 25, 1996
Husband and wife Dan and Michelle visit to celebrate Dan's birthday wish but Michelle is hesitant at first.
14	14	"All Night Long"	Robert Angelo	Robert Angelo	May 2, 1996
A bordello veteran who specializes in the art of striptease and her protégé make short work of two young sailors who come to Madam Winston's establishment.
15	15	"The Assignment"	Robert Angelo	Gilbert Alan & John Richardson	May 9, 1996
While researching the bordello for a newspaper article a reporter named Dave interviews Madam Winston, receives tour of the house and an eye-opening exclusive.
16	16	"Witness Protection"	Unknown	Unknown	May 16, 1996
A witness is sequestered at the bordello.
17	17	"Inspiration"	Robert Davis	J.K. Lighthouse	May 23, 1996
A frustrated novelist visits the Winston Spa seeking inspiration for the love scenes in his latest work.

=== Season 2 (1998) ===
No. overall	No. in season	Title	Directed by	Written by	Original release date
18	1	"Role Play"	Jon Burroughs	George Ayvas	February 5, 1998
A Hollywood starlet decides to delve deep into reality in order to research an upcoming role as a showbiz call girl.
19	2	"The Bachelor Party"	Jon Burroughs	Artie Kemper	February 12, 1998
A soon-to-be bride follows her fiancé to the bordello to watch his bachelor party.
20	3	"Love Lessons"	Jon Burroughs	Kenny Katamaran	February 19, 1998
On the eve of their wedding soon to be bride, Delores, sends her fiance, Ralph, to the Beverly Hills Bordello for expert lessons in lovemaking techniques.
21	4	"Janet & the Professor"	Jon Burroughs	George Avyas	February 26, 1998
Janet enrolls her professor friend in a private crash course for a master's degree in pleasure at Beverly Hills Bordello University.
22	5	"Performance"	Jon Burroughs	Michelle Gardner	March 5, 1998
Zena has lost her zest for enjoying and arousing her bordello clients. Madam Veronica places her with veteran Amanda for some motivation.
23	6	"Things Your Wife Won't Do"	Jon Burroughs	Jon Burroughs	March 12, 1998
A romantic anniversary celebration goes sour for Bill and Marie when he wants to spice up their sex life, but she isn't as adventurous. Frustrated, Bill takes his desires to the Beverly Hills Bordello.
24	7	"Research"	Jon Burroughs	Michelle Gardner	March 19, 1998
A college student writing an exposé on prostitution struggles with objectivity during an undercover stint at that haven of eroticism known as the Beverly Hills Bordello.
25	8	"In the Clinches"	Jon Burroughs	Kenny Katamaran	March 26, 1998
When a shady European customer named Otto threatens to expose the Bordello and it's clientele if Veronica doesn't give him free services, Veronica enlists the help of the local police chief to foil the blackmailer.
26	9	"Adultery... Cyber-Style"	Jon Burroughs	Jon Burroughs	April 2, 1998
When they enter the Beverly Hills Bordello "virtual" blue room where "anything is possible and everything is legal" two couples engage in "virtual" wife-swapping.
27	10	"Temptations"	Unknown	Unknown	April 9, 1998
When Jennifer finds herself having erotic fantasies about a female co-worker, she seeks advice from the Beverly Hills Bordello's on-line service and gets some friendly advice.
28	11	"The Witness"	Jon Burroughs	Artie Kemper	April 16, 1998
When a former Beverly Hills Bordello employee, now a federal agent, sequesters a witness at the bordello, with an unlimited account, undercover takes on a whole new meaning.
29	12	"Divine Inspiration"	Jon Burroughs	Artie Kemper	April 23, 1998
Veronica's new assistant is in reality an investigative reporter for a religious publication who is writing an exposé on the Beverly Hills Bordello until Veronica helps him to see the light from a different direction.
