= John Clark (actor) =

British actor, director and producer (1932–2023)

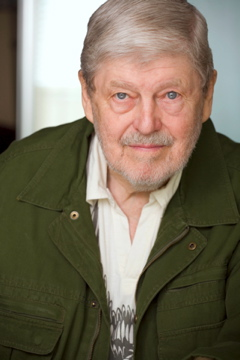
- Born: Ivan John Clark; 1 November 1932; London, England
- Died: 6 July 2023 (aged 90); California, U.S.
- Occupation: Actor
- Years active: 1944–2023
- Spouses: Kay Hawtrey (m. 1956; div. 1967) Lynn Redgrave (m. 1967; div. 2000) Miyuki Tsunoda (m. 2002)
- Children: 4
- Website: www.johnclarkprose.com

Ivan John Clark (1 November 1932 – 6 July 2023) was an English actor, director and producer. Clark is probably best known for his role as Just William in theatre and radio in the late 1940s and as the former husband of actress Lynn Redgrave, to whom he was married for 33 years. However, he established himself as a stage actor and director after moving to the United States in 1960, and became noted for directing plays featuring his wife in the 1970s beginning with A Better Place at Dublin's Gate Theatre (1973), then in America The Two of Us (1975), Saint Joan (1977–78), and a tour of California Suite (1976). In 1981, he directed an episode of the CBS television series House Calls, in which Redgrave starred.

During 1993–1994 Clark produced and directed the one-woman play, Shakespeare for My Father written and performed by Lynn Redgrave, which played on Broadway and then the Haymarket Theatre in London, followed by a tour of Australia and Canada.

== Early career ==
Clark was born in London. He grew up in the English village of Chipperfield, Hertfordshire and attended Watford Grammar School for Boys.

In 1944, a neighbour of Clark, who happened to be a BBC producer, asked him to play schoolboy D'arcy Minor as a one off in BBC Radio's The Will Hay Programme. The initial appearance led to a longer role, and he later went on to the variety version at the Victoria Palace in London's West End during the V-2 scare. Just four days before VE Day, the act was performed at the Life Guards Barracks in Windsor for the last time, at a British variety show for the Royal Family at midnight, 4 May 1945. For reasons of security, there was no prior announcement in the newspapers.

Following that, he became a star as the original Just William on both stage and radio in 1946–7. The BBC paid him 4 Guineas a show. He was the BBC's stock juvenile in radio plays such as Worzel Gummidge and one adapted from the classic novel by F. Anstey, Vice Versa. He also starred in Treasure Island with Harry Welchman at the St. James's Theatre. Prior to entering his national service, Clark made guest appearances around Britain in plays featuring teenagers.

== 1950s and 1960s ==
Clark served for three years in the Merchant Navy (as an alternative to national service) as an indentured apprentice on the Silver Line ships Silverwalnut and Silvertarn. After leaving the navy he emigrated to Toronto, Canada, to resume his career. Unknown in Canada, Clark became established as the original host of a weekly TV interview show Junior Magazine on the CBC's national network. He married Canadian actress Kay Hawtrey (who was six years his senior) in 1956 and appeared on stage in the musical Salad Days, seasons of repertory in Toronto and Ottawa, and acted in television dramas. Clark appeared in "The Browning Version" episode of The DuPont Show of the Month/Startime (1959–60).

He became interested in a new approach to acting when he worked with Luther Adler in Adler's touring American production of A View From the Bridge. He moved to New York City in 1960 and began a career on the American stage. In 1963, Clark starred in The Lion in Love at One Sheridan Square. In 1966 he played a prison officer alongside Ray Milland in the Broadway production at the Music Box Theatre of Hostile Witness, under director Reginald Denham.

Clark met actress Lynn Redgrave, a decade his junior, in November 1966 during a brief visit to London when he performed in What's Wrong with Humpty Dumpty?, a television play in which she starred as a trendy antiques store owner with Clark as her very gay assistant. When Redgrave came to New York, a friendship developed. He divorced Hawtrey in 1967, and she returned to her native Toronto with their son, while Clark remained in New York City and studied method acting with Lee Strasberg, according to Cindy Adams.

On 2 April 1967, Clark and Redgrave were married in Sidney Lumet's living room in New York City by an Ethical Culture minister. The event was photographed for Life Magazine by Michael Crawford. At the time, she was appearing in her first Broadway play, Black Comedy, and he was appearing as the Earl of Warren Off-Broadway in Roy Levine's production of MacBird!, which ran for 386 shows throughout 1967 and early 1968. In 1968, Clark appeared in the BBC Play of the Month on television, Cyrano de Bergerac, opposite Eric Porter who played the leading role.

== 1970s and 1980s ==
Clark produced and directed stage shows for Redgrave throughout the 1970s, including A Better Place at Dublin's Gate Theatre (1973) The Two of Us (1975), Saint Joan (1977–78, Broadway) and a tour of California Suite (1976). In George Bernard Shaw's 15th-century set Saint Joan, under Clark's directorship, Redgrave portrayed the maid of Orleans opposite Tom Aldredge, Joseph Bova, and Philip Bosco. The play was warmly received and was praised by New York theatre critics. He appeared in the Broadway play Comedians (1976–77), and directed Redgrave in Thursday's Girls (1982). He directed a 1981 episode of the CBS television series House Calls, in which Redgrave was then starring but she left under contentious circumstances and was replaced by Sharon Gless. In 1985, Clark had a minor role as a doctor in Richard Marquand's Jagged Edge. In 1987, he featured in Blood Frenzy, and in 1989, Clark portrayed a 10th-century King in the fantasy comedy film The Lords of Magick. In 1989–90, Clark appeared with Redgrave in Love Letters, which showed from October 1989 to January 1990 at the Edison Theatre on Broadway. It was nominated for the 1990 Pulitzer Prize for Drama.

== 1990–2023 ==
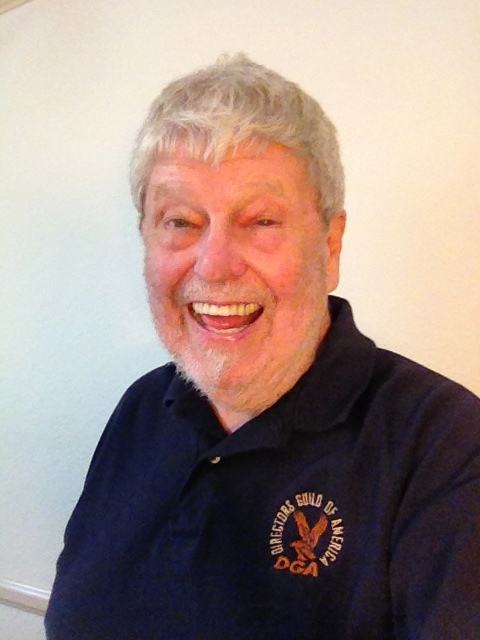
Clark in 2012

Clark's last co-venture with Redgrave was as the producer and director of her one-woman play Shakespeare for My Father which played at the Helen Hayes Theatre on Broadway (1993–94) and then the Haymarket Theatre in London, followed by a tour of Australia and Canada. The play received significant critical acclaim for Redgrave. New York Magazine described Shakespeare for my Father as "a one-woman show by Lynn Redgrave in which she reminisces about life with her father, Sir Michael Redgrave, with full scenes from Shakespeare's works", and stated that Redgrave's "sense of humor makes it a pleasure and privilege to watch". Patti Hartigan of The Boston Globe described the play as a "triumph", and Lloyd Rose of The Washington Post said of Redgrave's performance in Clark's production, "Particularly when she is not speaking, her face can seem to hold an impossible number of emotions simultaneously, yet such fullness of feeling is mysteriously unreadable. At such moments you glance up to Sir Michael's picture, which dominates the stage, and find the same."

After Clark's marriage to Redgrave ended in 2000, he stated that he struggled with his career, saying, "I've had to try to reinvent myself. The trouble is that when you marry a celebrity, you have to help that celebrity with their career - and that becomes your career." His subsequent credits included Charlie's Death Wish (2005) and the shorts First Time Long Time (2009) and Waiting (2012), in which Clark portrayed a crime family kingpin. Clark later slid into obscurity, apart from occasional news pieces that reminisced about his late ex-wife.

Clark was a paid up member of the Directors Guild of America, The Society of Stage Directors and Choreographers, Actors Equity, Screen Actors Guild, American Federation of Television and Radio Artists, British Equity, Canadian Actors Equity, and the Association of Canadian Television and Radio Artists.

In 2015 Clark was guest of honour at the Will Hay Appreciation Society's 'Will Hay Day' in Birmingham, England.

== Personal life ==
Clark and Redgrave lived in Barnes in London and Howth in County Dublin for a number of years before returning to the United States, where he was a citizen. They lived for 22 years at Colina Drive in Topanga, California. They had three children together. At one point, Redgrave had legally hyphenated her name to Redgrave-Clark. Redgrave filed for divorce in 1999 after Clark revealed to Redgrave that he had fathered a child in 1991 with her personal assistant, who later married (and subsequently divorced) Clark and Redgrave's son. The divorce proceedings were front-page news for months. Clark defended himself in Family Court proceedings before Judge Arnold Gold, contested the tabloid's version of events, though he had been extensively quoted in the same tabloids, and wrote about his views on court proceedings at his website. Redgrave's one-woman play Nightingale (2009), which explored the life of her maternal grandmother, also included reflections about her marriage to Clark.

Clark met his third wife, Miyuki Tsunoda, via an online dating service and they married in 2002. In 2005, he appeared in the film Charlie's Death Wish. On 13 December 2006, Clark suffered a heart attack. After angioplasty surgery, he received the implant of a pacemaker.

Clark died at his home in California on 6 July 2023, at the age of 90.
