= Peter E. Berger =

American film editor (1944–2011)

- Berger in the 1980s
- Born: Peter Edward Berger; May 30, 1944; Los Angeles, California, U.S.
- Died: September 22, 2011 (aged 67); Calabasas, California, U.S.
- Occupation: Film editor
- Years active: 1968–2009
- Father: Fred W. Berger

Peter Edward Berger (May 30, 1944 – September 22, 2011) was an American film editor with about fifty feature and television film credits. He is known for editing films such as Mommie Dearest (1981), four films in the Star Trek series (from Star Trek IV: The Voyage Home (1986) through Star Trek: Insurrection (1998)), Fatal Attraction (1987), and Coach Carter (2005). His last credit was for the television biopic Gifted Hands: The Ben Carson Story (2009). It was his sixth collaboration with director Thomas Carter. With Michael Kahn, Berger won the 1989 BAFTA Award for Best Editing for Fatal Attraction, and they were nominated for the Academy Award and the American Cinema Editors Eddie for the film.

Berger was the son of film editor Fred W. Berger. He attended film school at the University of California, Los Angeles (UCLA), served in the United States Army, and worked for the Armed Forces Korean Network in Seoul. He began his career in 1968 working on the television program, The Doris Day Show. His first credit was for the feature film Arnold (1973).

== Filmography ==
Editor
Year	Film	Director	Notes
1976	Hot Potato	Oscar Williams	
1977	The Pack	Robert Clouse	Third collaboration with Robert Clouse
1979	The Promise	Gilbert Cates	First collaboration with Gilbert Cates
1980	The Last Married Couple in America	Gilbert Cates	Second collaboration with Gilbert Cates
1980	Oh, God! Book II	Gilbert Cates	Third collaboration with Gilbert Cates
1981	First Monday in October	Ronald Neame	
1981	Mommie Dearest	Frank Perry	First collaboration with Frank Perry
1982	Monsignor	Frank Perry	Second collaboration with Frank Perry
1983	Staying Alive	Sylvester Stallone	
1986	Fire with Fire	Duncan Gibbins	
1986	Star Trek IV: The Voyage Home	Leonard Nimoy	First collaboration with Leonard Nimoy
1987	Fatal Attraction	Adrian Lyne	
1987	Less than Zero	Marek Kanievska	
1988	Memories of Me	Henry Winkler	
1988	The Good Mother	Leonard Nimoy	Second collaboration with Leonard Nimoy
1989	Star Trek V: The Final Frontier	William Shatner	
1990	Funny About Love	Leonard Nimoy	Third collaboration with Leonard Nimoy
1991	Dead Again	Kenneth Branagh	
1991	All I Want for Christmas	Robert Lieberman	
1992	Stay Tuned	Peter Hyams	
1993	Hocus Pocus	Kenny Ortega	
1994	Holy Matrimony	Leonard Nimoy	Fourth collaboration with Leonard Nimoy
1994	Star Trek Generations	David Carson	
1995	Lawnmower Man 2: Beyond Cyberspace	Farhad Mann	Uncredited
1996	Homeward Bound II: Lost in San Francisco	David R. Ellis	
1997	Metro	Thomas Carter	First collaboration with Thomas Carter
1997	Red Corner	Jon Avnet	First collaboration with Jon Avnet
1998	Star Trek: Insurrection	Jonathan Frakes	First collaboration with Jonathan Frakes
2001	Save the Last Dance	Thomas Carter	Second collaboration with Thomas Carter
2001	Lover's Prayer	Reverge Anselmo	
2002	Clockstoppers	Jonathan Frakes	Second collaboration with Jonathan Frakes
2002	Like Mike	John Schultz	
2004	Garfield: The Movie	Peter Hewitt	
2005	Coach Carter	Thomas Carter	Third collaboration with Thomas Carter
2007	88 Minutes	Jon Avnet	Second collaboration with Jon Avnet
2007	Alvin and the Chipmunks	Tim Hill	

Editorial department
Year	Film	Director	Role	Notes	Other notes
1973	Arnold	Georg Fenady	Assistant editor		
1974	Golden Needles	Robert Clouse	Assistant film editor	First collaboration with Robert Clouse	
1974	The Savage Is Loose	George C. Scott	Assistant film editor		
1975	The Devil's Rain	Robert Fuest	Assistant film editor		
1975	The Ultimate Warrior	Robert Clouse	Assistant editor	Second collaboration with Robert Clouse	Uncredited
1976	Special Delivery	Paul Wendkos	Assistant editor		
1977	Walking Tall: Final Chapter	Jack Starrett	Assistant editor		
1985	Vision Quest	Harold Becker	Additional film editor		
1990	Internal Affairs	Mike Figgis	Additional editor		

Thanks
Year	Film	Director	Role	Notes
2008	Righteous Kill	Jon Avnet	Special thanks	Third collaboration with Jon Avnet

Documentaries

Editor
Year	Film	Director
1975	King of the Underwater World	Walter Starck
1976	It's Showtime	Alan Myerson; Fred Weintraub; Paul Heller
1992	The Magical World of Chuck Jones	George Daugherty

TV movies

Editor
Year	Film	Director
1978	Kiss Meets the Phantom of the Park	Gordon Hessler
1983	The Face of Rage	Donald Wrye
1983	Hobson's Choice	Gilbert Cates
1984	Burning Rage	Gilbert Cates
1984	Silence of the Heart	Richard Michaels
1985	Scandal Sheet	David Lowell Rich
1985	Heart of a Champion: The Ray Mancini Story	Richard Michaels
1989	Do You Know the Muffin Man?	Gilbert Cates
2009	Gifted Hands: The Ben Carson Story	Thomas Carter

TV series

Editor
Year	Title	Notes
1977−78	The Skatebirds	16 episodes
1979	CHiPs	1 episode
1984	Call to Glory	1 episode
1990	Equal Justice	1 episode
