= Celebrity Vinyl =

2008 satirtical book

- Author: Tom Hamling
- Language: English
- Genre: Coffee table book
- Publisher: Mark Batty Publisher
- Publication date: 2008
- ISBN: 978-0-9795546-2-9

Celebrity Vinyl is a satirical coffee table book published in 2008 that chronicles the unsuccessful singing attempts of famous actors, actresses, and athletes. Published by Mark Batty Publisher, this book is based on the personal vinyl record collection of author and advertising creative director Tom Hamling.

Hamling writes that Celebrity Vinyl: "is not a study in pop culture. Or kitsch. Or really even music, for that matter. It's a study in the consecration of fame."

== Reception ==
The Boston Herald said the book collected the author's "wonderfully terrible record collection" and "gathers the worst of the worst". John McLeod of Flagpole Magazine called the work "great fun for fans of albums" such as The Return of Bruno by Bruce Willis.

== Celebrity albums included ==
Celebrity albums featured in the book include:

- Ed McMahon – And Me…I'm Ed McMahon
- Leonard Nimoy – Mr. Spock's Music From Outer Space
- Jimmy Swaggart – Down The Sawdust Trail
- David Hasselhoff – Night Rocker
- Muhammad Ali – The Adventure of Ali and His Gang Vs. Mr. Tooth Decay. A Children's Story
- Muhammad Ali – I'm The Greatest
- Bruce Willis – The Return of Bruno
- Ethel Merman – The Ethel Merman Disco Album
- John Travolta – 20 Golden Pieces of John Travolta
- Goldie Hahn – Goldie
- Rodney Dangerfield – Rappin' Rodney
- Barbie – Barbie Sing-along
- Jesse Ventura – Jesse (The Body) Ventura
- Burt Reynolds – Ask Me What I Am
- Lisa Whelchel – All Because of You
- Mister Rogers – You Are Special
- William 'The Refrigerator' Perry – Fat Boys Chillin' with the 'Refrigerator'
- Chevy Chase – Chevy Chase
- Shaquille O'Neal – I'm Outstanding
- Scott Baio – Scott Baio
- Dick Van Dyke – Songs I Like
- The New York Islanders – A Christmas Album
- Louis Farrakhan – Let Us Unite
- Don Johnson – Heartbeat
- Philip Michael Thomas – Living the Book of My Life
- Philip Michael Thomas – Somebody
- Joe Piscopo – New Jersey
- Webster – Good Secrets! Bad Secrets! – The Important New Recording That Teaches Children How To AVOID Molestation!
- Colonel Sanders – Christmas Day With Colonel Sanders
- Jackie Gleason – How Sweet It Is For Lovers
- Eddie Murphy – So Happy
- Cheryl Ladd – Cheryl Ladd
- John Schneider – Tryin to Outrun the Wind
- Burgess Meredith – Songs and Stories of The Gold Rush
- Terry Bradshaw – Here In My Heart
- Raquel Welch – This Girl's Back In Town'
- ABC Soap Opera Stars – Love In the Afternoon
- Mister Rogers – Let's Be Together Today
- Eddie Murphy – How Could It Be
- Shaquille O'Neal – shoot, pass, slam
- World Wrestling Federation - The Wrestling Album
- Gregory Hines – Gregory Hines
- Merv Griffin – A Tinkling Piano In the Next Apartment
- Jim Nabors – "Love Me With All Your Heart / Cuando Calienta el Sol" (?)
- Jimmy Swaggart – Jesus Will Outshine Them All
- Jimmy Swaggart – Songs From Mama's Songbook
- Telly Savalas – Telly
- The Cast of Dallas – Dallas – The Music Story
- William Shatner – Live
- Tracey Ullman – You Broke My Heart In 17 Places
- Mr. Magoo – Magoo in Hi-Fi
- David Cassidy – David Cassidy
- Jack Wagner – All I Need
- Barbie – Looking Good. Feeling Great. Exercise Album
- Morton Downey Jr. - Morton Downey Jr. Sings
- Tammy Faye Bakker – The Lord's On My Side (Psalm 124:2)
- John Davidson – Well, Here I Am.
- George DeWitt – Name That Tune
- Telly Savalas – The Two Sides of Telly Savalas
- Carol Burnett – If I Could Write a Song
- The Brady Bunch Kids – The Kids From The Brady Bunch
- Ted Knight – Hi Guys
- Jim Nabors – By Request
- Jerry Lewis – Just Sings
- The Brady Bunch Kids – Merry Christmas From the Brady Bunch
- Joe Piscopo – I Love Rock n' Roll (Medley)
- John Davidson – Every Time I Sing a Love Song
- Lorne Greene – Welcome to the Ponderosa
- Lorne Greene – The Man
- George Burns – George Burns In Nashville
- Grace Jones – Fame
- Marilyn Monroe – The Very Best of Marilyn Monroe
- John Travolta – Can't Let You Go
- Lisa Hartman – 'Til My Heart Stops
- Jimmy Swaggart – Camp Meeting Piano
- Kristy & Jimmy McNichol - Kristy & Jimmy McNichol
- David Soul – Playing to An Audience of One
- Eddie Albert – The Eddie Albert Album
- Jim Nabors – Old Time Religion
- The Brady Bunch Kids – Meet the Brady Bunch
- Martin Mull – No Hits, Four Errors. The Best of Martin Mull
- The Colonel's Mandolin Band – Favorite Old Church Hymns Recorded For the Glorification Of Christ
- Professional Wrestlers – Wrestling Rocks
- John Travolta – John Travolta
- Smothers Brothers – The Smothers Brothers Play It Straight
- Robert Guillaume – I Who Have Nothing
- The Chicago Bears Shufflin' Crew – The Super Bowl Shuffle
- The Cast Of The Beverly Hillbillies – The Beverly Hillbillies
- Lorne Greene – Have a Happy Holiday
- Rick Dees – I'm Not Crazy
- The Stars Of Gentle Ben – The Bear Facts
- Nipsey Russell – Sing Along With Nipsey Russell
- Don Johnson – Let It Roll
- Anthony Quinn – In My Own Way...I Love You
- Tony Randall And Jack Klugman – The Odd Couple Sings
- Andy Griffith – Somebody Bigger Than You and I
- Carroll O'Connor – Remembering You
- Laverne & Shirley – Laverne & Shirley Sing
- Sandra Bernhard – I'm Your Woman
- John Schneider – Take the Long Way Home
- Andy Griffith – This Here
- Jim and Tammy Faye Bakker – Building on the Rock
- Jimmy Swaggart – Camp Meeting Piano
- Shirley MacLaine – Live At The Palace
- Grace Jones – Living My Life
- Tony Perkins – "On a Rainy Afternoon"
- Dallas Cowboys – The New Dallas Cowboys – Christmas '86
- George Burns – A Musical Trip With George Burns
- Buddy Ebsen – Buddy Ebsen Says Howdy In Song and Story
