= Alan Weeks =

Alan Weeks is the name of:

- Alan Weeks (actor) (1948–2015), American actor, singer, dancer, choreographer, and director
- Alan Weeks (sports reporter) (1923–1996), English television sports reporter and commentator
