= Earl Jolly Brown =

American actor (1939–2006)

- Born: Edwin Earl Brown; October 18, 1939; Houston, Texas, U.S.
- Died: August 26, 2006 (aged 66); Clark County, Nevada, U.S.
- Occupation: Actor
- Years active: 1973–1990

Edwin Earl "Jolly" Brown (October 18, 1939 – August 26, 2006) was an American actor.

Brown's best known role was as Whisper, a henchman in the 1973 James Bond film Live and Let Die. Other film appearances include Black Belt Jones (1974), Truck Turner (1974) and Linda Lovelace for President (1975). He was also active on television, with credits including Perry Mason, The Odd Couple, and Laverne and Shirley.

== Filmography ==
Year	Title	Role	Notes
1973	Live and Let Die	Whisper	
1974	Black Belt Jones	Jelly	
1974	Truck Turner	Overweight Bar Patron	Uncredited
1975	Linda Lovelace for President	Polmes	
1984	Beverly Hills Cop	Bar Patron	Uncredited
