= Jack S. Margolis =

American writer (1934–1997)

Jack S. Margolis (1934–1997) was a counterculture writer. He was known for his pro-marijuana book A Child's Garden of Grass, which he developed into a comedy album in the 1970s with Jere Alan Brian and producer Ron Jacobs. Margolis also worked as a screenwriter and wrote the script for Claudio Guzmán's 1975 film Linda Lovelace for President. Prior to that, Margolis wrote the Jay Ward Productions film, The Nut House!!.

== Bibliography ==
=== Books ===
- A Child's Garden of Grass: The Official Handbook for Marijuana Users (1970, with Richard Clorfene)
- Cooking for Orgies & Other Large Parties (1972)
- The Ins & Outs of Orgies (1973)
- The Poetry of Richard Milhouse Nixon (1974)
- Impotence Is Always Having to Say You're Sorry, and Other Questionable Insights (1975)
- Jack S. Margolis' Complete Book of Recreational Drugs (1978)

=== Scripts ===
- The Nut House!! (1964)
- Linda Lovelace for President (1975)

== Discography ==
- A Child's Garden of Grass: A Pre-Legalization Comedy (with Jere Alan Brian and Ron Jacobs) 1971 Elektra Records

== Filmography ==
- I Love You, Alice B. Toklas! (1968, as Big Bear)
- Knock Outs (1992)
- Roots of Evil (1992, Ralph)
- Death Dancers (1993, as Ruben)

== See also ==
- Watermark Inc.
