= Death Drug =

1978 film by Oscar Williams

- Directed by: Oscar Williams
- Written by: Roland S. Jefferson
- Produced by: Demetrius Johnson
- Starring: Philip Michael Thomas
- Cinematography: Nicholas Josef von Sternberg
- Release date: 1978
- Running time: 73 minutes
- Country: United States
- Language: English

Death Drug is a 1978 American exploitation film directed by Oscar Williams that deals with the harsh and deadly effects of PCP, or "angel dust". The film starred Philip Michael Thomas as a plumber turned musical artist who got hooked on angel dust, leading to a drastic change in personality and, soon, his demise.

== Plot ==
The film begins with a news anchor reporting on a crazy man, suspected to be high on angel dust, attacking a group of roller skaters at a park in Venice, California; the man was apprehended by police and handcuffed, but broke free of the handcuffs and escaped, only to get hit by an automobile and die of his injuries.

Then entering the scene is Jesse Thomas, a plumber with a desire to be a successful singer and musician. Jesse was living a decent life with his fiancée until one day, he was accepted into a music conservatory and, later, a recording contract with Crown Records.

To celebrate, Jesse and his fiancée go to a night club; performing at the club was The Gap Band, who perform several numbers and even let Jesse play keyboard. At one point, Jesse went to the restroom where he was accosted by a drug dealer, who gave Jesse a free sample of "whack", a cigarette laced with angel dust. At the table, Jesse took a few puffs of the cigarette, leading to a hallucination of a moving painting on an otherwise-blank wall.

Convinced of the magic cigarette's powers, he became hooked on angel dust, making regular visits with his drug dealer to get more of the stuff. All the while, his musical career continued, resulting with an album that won a Grammy and went double platinum. However, the effects of angel dust has more and more complicated his life, leading to objects that magically turn into strange creatures (such as a hairbrush turning into a baby alligator), hallucinations that has interrupted his recording sessions, and paranoia of his friends and loved ones turning against him.

Later on, Jesse visits a local nursing home, where he visits a man in a wheelchair that he identified as his father. Jesse talks about his success and becomes very saddened about it, especially after noticing that his father is non-responsive of the news, other than saying, "I have no son", in a nod to The Jazz Singer.

Jesse and his now-wife later shop at a supermarket; while there, Jesse began to experience severe hallucinations, ranging from rats in a pile of oranges, to shoppers and employees turning into zombies and ogres, to spiders magically appearing on Jesse's arm. Scared and mentally tormented, Jesse leaves the store through the back onto a street, running towards a moving delivery truck, thinking that it was alive. The driver, not seeing Jesse until the last second, struck him, killing him on the scene.

The accident was followed by special news bulletin by Larry McCormick, announcing the death of Jesse Thomas. McCormick then interviews an executive with Crown Records, who talked about Jesse's accomplishments, then later admitting that they should have done something about his addiction when they first suspected that there was a problem. The film then flashes forward five years, where Jesse's widowed wife and their child, Jesse Jr., visit Jesse's grave; while there, they noticed nearby the drug dealer that sold angel dust to Jesse, still in business.

== Cast ==
- Philip Michael Thomas as Jesse Thomas
- Vernee Watson-Johnson as Carolyn Thomas
- Frankie Crocker as drug dealer
- Casey Biggs as Melvin
- Ric Mancino as Mr. Simms
- Rosalind Cash as Dr. Harris
- John Poole as record executive
- Larry McCormick as himself
- The Gap Band as themselves

== Home media ==
Death Drug was released on home video in 1986 by Academy Home Entertainment in the US; the home video release included a taped introduction and closing by Philip Michael Thomas, talking about his acting accomplishments (including his then-current role on Miami Vice) and the lessons learned while acting in Death Drug. The video also included Philip Michael Thomas' music video of "Just the Way I Planned It", from his album, Living the Book of My Life; the music video was presented as part of a news report in the middle of the picture, introduced as a "music clip" from Philip Michael Thomas' character, Jesse Thomas.

In addition to Philip Michael Thomas' intro and outro and his music video, the Academy Home Video release also includes several filmed segments inserted into the original movie that frequently contradict both the actual film as well as each other.
