= The Annihilation of Fish =

1999 film

- 4K restoration release poster
- Directed by: Charles Burnett
- Written by: Anthony C. Winkler
- Produced by: Kris Dodge; Paul Heller; William Lawrence Fabrizio; Eric Mitchell; John Remark
- Starring: Lynn Redgrave; James Earl Jones; Margot Kidder
- Cinematography: John Ndiaga Demps; Rick Robinson
- Edited by: Nancy Richardson
- Music by: Laura Karpman
- Distributed by: Kino Lorber
- Release date: September 12, 1999 (TIFF)
- Running time: 108 minutes
- Country: United States
- Language: English
- Box office: $70,840

The Annihilation of Fish is a 1999 American romance film directed by Charles Burnett and starring Lynn Redgrave, James Earl Jones and Margot Kidder.

== Plot ==
Wistful and lonely Flower 'Poinsettia' Cummings is freshly out of a relationship with the dead composer Giacomo Puccini, while Jamaican immigrant Obadiah 'Fish' Johnson has just been released from a mental institution that cannot cure him of the antagonistic demon that follows him wherever he goes. When the two become neighbors, they embark on an unlikely romance.

== Cast ==
- Lynn Redgrave as Poinsettia
- James Earl Jones as "Fish"
- Margot Kidder as Mrs. Muldroone
- Phillip Kako as Hippie Preacher
- Shannon Wilcox as Hippie Preacher's Wife
- Hoyt Richards as Man in Bar
- Anthony Guidera as Gun Seller
- Linden Chiles as Doctor

== Reception ==
On the review aggregator website Rotten Tomatoes, 76% of 29 critics' reviews are positive, with an average rating of 6.7/10. Metacritic, which uses a weighted average, assigned the film a score of 63 out of 100, based on 9 critics, indicating "generally favorable" reviews.

Merle Bertrand of Film Threat wrote, "Romantic comedies have become something of a tired staple in indie filmmaking, these days. Yet, odd as it may seem, it’s the unlikely interracial geriatric chops on display in The Annihilation of Fish that breathe new life into the genre." Todd McCarthy of Variety wrote, "It’s hard to imagine what the filmmakers were thinking when they put this project together, in that it’s a picture about two oldsters with very little forward momentum, no subplots and the barest of production values. The stars and director Charles Burnett have names to reckon with, but they’ll all have to write this one off as a misguided bit of whimsy."

Upon the film's re-release in 2025, Robert Daniels of RogerEbert.com gave the film four out of four stars and wrote, "In The Annihilation of Fish, age is the accumulation of scars. Aching memories, unhealed bruises and pent-up desires remain alive even when many of the sights and sounds that once decorated one's existence are dormant. For James Earl Jones and Lynn Redgrave, two actors who were already in the autumn of their lives when the film was initially released a quarter century ago, age appears to have been an especially potent subject."

== Preservation ==
The Annihilation of Fish was restored by the UCLA Film & Television Archive and The Film Foundation, in collaboration with Milestone Films, from the 35mm original picture and track negatives. Restoration funding was provided by the Hobson/Lucas Family Foundation. The restoration had its west coast premiere at the 2024 UCLA Festival of Preservation.

== Home media ==
The film was released on DVD and Blu-ray on June 17, 2025.
