= Anthony C. Winkler =

Jamaican novelist (1945–2015)

- Born: February 25, 1942; Kingston, Colony of Jamaica, British Empire
- Died: September 18, 2015 (aged 73)
- Occupation: Novelist
- Spouse: Cathy Winkler (m. 1975)
- Children: 2

Anthony C. Winkler (25 February 1942 – 18 September 2015) was a successful Jamaican novelist and popular contributor to many post-secondary English literary texts. His first novel, The Painted Canoe (1986), although taking the most time to write and publish, was his most rewarding, allowing him to move on and produce his best known book, The Lunatic (1987), which earned him a spot on the bestseller list. He also co-authored a number of English grammar textbooks, and other non-fiction works.

== Early life and career ==
Anthony C. Winkler was born in Kingston, Jamaica, where he lived until he was eight years old. He then moved to Montego Bay in St. James the following year, only to return to Kingston to live with his grandparents a year later. He went on to attend three different secondary schools: Excelsior High School in Kingston, and then Mt. Alvernia Academy and Cornwall College, both in Montego Bay.

After high school, Winkler moved back to Kingston, where he obtained employment as an accounting clerk for a few businesses around the city. At the age of 21, he left Jamaica for the United States to pursue his B.A., graduating in 1967, and then completing an M.A. in 1968.

Upon graduation, he taught briefly at Pasadena City College, before collaborating with JoRay McCuen-Metherell, a department head at Glendale Community College (California) whom he met while selling textbooks. They got together to write and had a 40-plus year relationship writing all the textbooks except for his first, Poetry As System. Winkler had worked as a textbook salesman in California and realised that he could improve the quality of the writing in the textbooks that he was trying to sell. He submitted two chapters, for which he was rewarded a thousand dollars as a first book advance.

== Writing career ==
Winkler's literature has been published and sold all over the world. More famous for his novels and two screenplays, he has also contributed to a number of post-secondary English textbooks for almost four decades. Writing textbooks has been his full-time job, writing fiction has been his second job.

Along with the series of novels that Winkler published throughout his career, there are also a few autobiographical works, but none more important than Going Home to Teach. This book is about the experiences Anthony and his wife, Cathy, share when returning to Jamaica to work at a teacher trainer college in 1975.

Winkler wrote a number of novels, though his very first — called The Painted Canoe — took more than 10 years to get published. His next book, The Lunatic, was published in 1987, just a year after his first novel. The Lunatic received great success, propelling the book to be adapted into a movie in 1991.

In 2004, Winkler published a collection of short stories, The Annihilation of Fish and Other Stories, from which the story "The Annihilation of Fish" was made into a film starring James Earl Jones, Lynn Redgrave and Margot Kidder. Winkler also wrote two plays: The Burglar, produced at the Little Theatre in May 2003 had a Canadian premier in Toronto in 2005 with the help of fellow Jamaican Paul Harrington-Smith, as well as in Kingston with the help of another good friend Maxine Walters, and The Hippopotamus Card in 2004. Winkler's last novel was The Family Mansion, about Europe's colonisation of Jamaica that he started in his previous novel God Carlos, which won the Townsend Prize for Fiction.

In 2014 he was awarded a Gold Musgrave Medal by the Institute of Jamaica for his contribution to literature.

== Novels ==
- The Painted Canoe (1986)ISBN 9789766101534
- The Lunatic (1987)ISBN 9780818404283
- The Great Yacht Race (1992)ISBN 9789766250270, 9766250278
- The Duppy (1996)ISBN 9781405068840, 1405068841
- The Annihilation of Fish And Other Stories (2004)ISBN 9781405026390
- Dog War (2007)ISBN 9781933354286
- Crocodile (2010)ISBN 9781405063739
- God Carlos (2012)ISBN 9781617751417
- The Family Mansion (Akashic Books, 2013)ISBN 9781617751745

== Non-fiction ==
- Bob Marley: My Son (2003)ISBN 9780878332984
- Going Home to Teach (2006)ISBN 9781405068833
- Trust the Darkness: My Life as a Writer (2008)ISBN 9780230026049

== Textbook contribution ==
- Readings for Writers (1974)
- Rhetoric Made Plain (1978)
- Writing the Research Paper: A Handbook (1979)
- Writing: Sentences, Paragraphs, and Essays (1981)
- Exposition: Model Paragraphs and Essays (1982)
- From Idea to Essay: A Rhetoric, Reader, and Handbook (1983)
- A Brief Introduction to Speech (1983)
- Models For Expository Writing: Model Paragraphs And Essays (1985)
- Rewriting Writing: A Rhetoric Reader and Handbook (1990)
- Reading, Writing, And The Humanities (1991)
- From Reading, Writing (1993)
- Prentice Hall Pocket Guide for Writers (1994)
- Writing Talk (1996)
- Grammar Talk (1997)
- Salvation By Langston Hughes (DVD): The Wadsworth Original Film Series In Literature (2003)
- Writing Talk: Sentences and Paragraphs with Readings (2005)
- Writing Talk: Paragraphs and Short Essays with Readings (2008)
- Grammar Matters: Sentence Basics and Essential Grammar (2011)
- New Mywritinglab with Pearson Etext – Standalone Access Card – For Grammar Matters (2012)
- Grammar Matters Plus New Mywritinglab – Access Card Package (2012)

== Filmography ==
- The Lunatic (book author/screenwriter 1991)
- Cool Runnings (screenwriter, 1993)
- The Annihilation of Fish (screenwriter, 1999)

== Personal life ==
Anthony married his wife, Cathy, in 1975 in St. Ann, Jamaica, and continued to travel with her around the United States as well as to and from Jamaica from time-to-time. Since 1979 they resided in Atlanta, Georgia. They have two children.

Winkler was very active in the Jamaican community and was elected president of the Atlanta Jamaica Association for two terms. He was a member of the Writers Guild of America. He also coordinated Hurricane Gilbert relief efforts and scholarship programs.

Winkler died at his home in Dunwoody, Georgia, aged 73, on 18 September 2015.
