= Danny Goldman =

American actor (1939–2020)

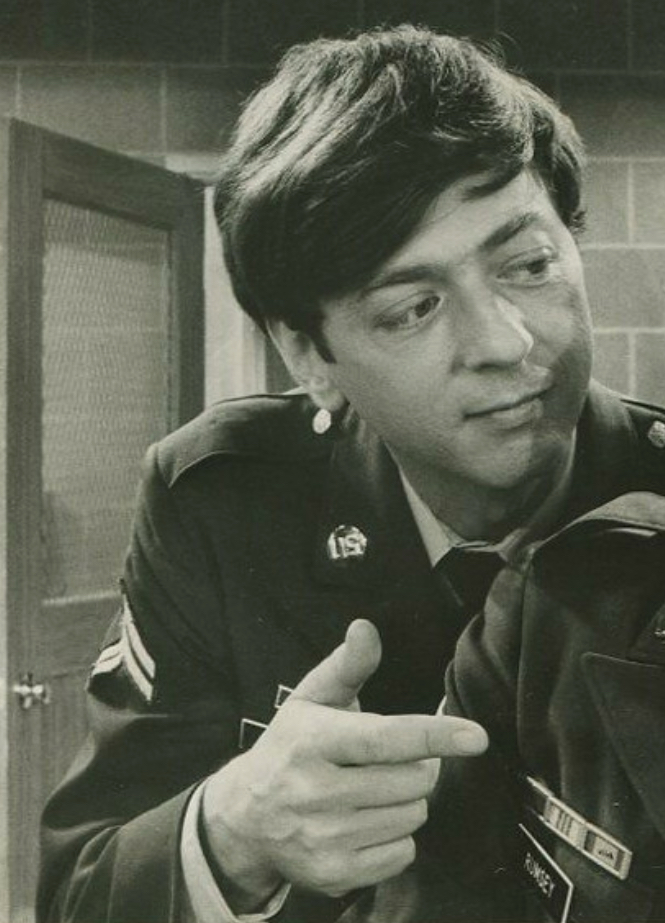
- Goldman in 1976
- Born: Daniel Goldman; October 30, 1939; New York City, U.S.
- Died: April 12, 2020 (aged 80); Los Angeles, California, U.S.
- Occupations: Actor; casting director
- Years active: 1963–2012

Daniel Goldman (October 30, 1939 – April 12, 2020) was an American actor and casting director. He was the voice of Brainy Smurf in Hanna-Barbera's The Smurfs (1981–1989).

== Early life ==
Goldman graduated from Far Rockaway High School in Queens, New York City, in 1957. He subsequently attended and graduated from Columbia University in Manhattan, in 1961.

== Career ==
One of his first roles was that of Nick Dutton, the son of an industrialist who knew the truth about his family's new butler and housekeeper, and helped them get acquainted in their new jobs in the 1971 situation comedy The Good Life. Among his other early roles on television were appearances in the TV shows That Girl; Room 222; The Partridge Family; Love, American Style; Needles and Pins; Columbo; Baretta and Chico and the Man. He was a regular member of the cast of the situation comedy Busting Loose in 1977. Goldman was also featured as Ozzie the Answer in the 1980s detective drama Mickey Spillane's Mike Hammer and as Dr. Denton on Get Smart, Again! He acted in the episode "I'll Kill 'Em Again" of police drama Hawaii Five-O and in the episodes "Brain Child" and "42" in Trapper John, M.D. Goldman appeared as a panelist on the What's My Line? TV program during its syndicated run, and on the live stage version in Hollywood several years later. In 2005, he appeared in an episode of the sitcom The King of Queens.

His feature film debut was in MASH (1970). Other credits included a small role as a persistent medical student who asks Dr. Frankenstein (Gene Wilder) about his grandfather in Young Frankenstein (1974), and roles in Busting (1974), Linda Lovelace for President (1975), Tunnel Vision (1976), The Missouri Breaks (1976), Swap Meet (1979), Wholly Moses! (1980) and My Man Adam (1985). He also portrayed Porter in Where the Buffalo Roam (1980).

Goldman voiced the pedantic Brainy Smurf (1981–1989) on the animated series The Smurfs. He returned to the voice of Brainy Smurf for the television show Robot Chicken in several segments.

For nearly 30 years, Goldman was a casting director of television commercials in Hollywood.

== Death ==
Goldman died in his home in Los Angeles on April 12, 2020, from complications of two strokes.

== Filmography ==
- MASH (1970) as Capt. Murrhardt
- The Strawberry Statement (1970) as Charlie
- Beware! The Blob (1972) as Bearded Teenager
- Columbo (1972) as Milton
- The World's Greatest Athlete (1973) as Leopold Maxwell
- The Long Goodbye (1973) as Bartender (uncredited)
- Why (1973) as The Businessman
- Hawaii Five-O (1974, TV series) as Eddie Josephs
- Busting (1974) as Mr. Crosby
- Win, Place or Steal (1974) as Froggy
- Young Frankenstein (1974) as Medical Student
- Linda Lovelace for President (1975) as Bruce Whippoorwill
- Tunnel Vision (1976) as Barry Flanken
- The Missouri Breaks (1976) as Baggage Clerk
- Busting Loose (1977, TV series) as Lester Bellman
- Beyond Death's Door (1979)
- Swap Meet (1979) as Ziggy
- Where the Buffalo Roam (1980) as Porter
- Wholly Moses! (1980) as Scribs
- The Smurfs (1981–1989, TV series) as Brainy Smurf (voice)
- Mickey Spillane's Mike Hammer (1984–1987, TV series) as Ozzie "The Answer"
- Strong Kids, Safe Kids (1984) as Brainy Smurf (voice)
- My Man Adam (1985) as Dr. Blaustein
- General Hospital (1991, TV series) as Clarence Darrow
- Capitol Critters (1992, TV series) as Opie the Squirrel (voice)
- Batman: The Animated Series (1993, TV series) as Sam Giddell (voice)
- Mighty Max (1994, TV series) as Marlin Curt / Cyberskull (voice)
- Free (2001) as Dr. Franklin Gibbles
- The King of Queens (2005) as Jacob
- Robot Chicken (2005–2011, TV series) as Brainy Smurf (voice)
- Criminal Minds (2011–2012, TV series) as Detective Bob Zablonsky (final film role)
