= Anthony Guidera =

American actor (1964–2026)

- Born: October 18, 1960; San Francisco, California, U.S.
- Died: June 6, 2026 (aged 65); Los Angeles, California, U.S.
- Occupation: Actor
- Years active: 1990–2005
- Spouse: Valarie

Anthony Guidera (October 18, 1960 – June 6, 2026) was an American actor who appeared in films and television series.

== Life and career ==
Guidera was born in San Francisco on October 18, 1960.

His first role was as a bodyguard in The Godfather Part III. He also appeared in Species, The Rock, The Postman, and Armageddon.

Guidera guest starred in television series such as Renegade, Baywatch, Star Trek: Deep Space Nine ("The Circle"), and Angel ("The Ring").

In 1996, he won the MTV Movie Award for Best Kiss with co-star Natasha Henstridge in Species.

Guidera died on June 6, 2026, at the age of 65.

== Partial filmography ==
- The Godfather Part III (1990) – Anthony, the Bodyguard
- Species (1995) – Robbie, Guy Picking Up Sil
- The Rock (1996) – Lead F-18 Pilot
- Precious Find (1996) – Jumper #1
- 'Til There Was You (1997) – Maitre D'
- The Postman (1997) – Bridge City Guard
- Armageddon (1998) – Co-Pilot Tucker
- The Annihilation of Fish (1999) – Gun Seller
