= Henry Kingi =

American stuntman and actor (born 1943)

- Born: December 2, 1943 (age 81); Los Angeles, California, U.S.
- Other names: Masao Henry Kingi
- Occupation(s): Stuntman, actor
- Years active: 1969–present
- Spouses: Eilene Frances Davis (m. 1966; div. 1980) Lindsay Wagner (m. 1981; div. 1984)
- Children: 4

Henry Kingi (born December 2, 1943) is an American stuntman and actor. As a stuntman he has worked in films like Fast Five (2011). His acting roles include Goody in Car Wash (1976), Shell in Earth Star Voyager (1988), the mean Indian in Far Out Man (1990), Kungai Demon in Parting Gifts, an episode of Angel (1999), and George in From Mexico with Love (2009). As a miscrew he worked in films like The Assault, From Paris with Love, Patriots Day and Colt 45.

== Biography ==
Henry Kingi was born in Los Angeles on December 2, 1943. He is of Native American, African American, European, and Japanese descent.

He has a son, Henry Kingi Jr. who was born in 1970 and also a stuntman.

He married actress Lindsay Wagner in May 1981, divorcing in 1984. Together they have sons Dorian (born 1982) and Alexander (born 1986). Both sons are also stuntmen.

In her book, Art of Men (I Prefer Mine Al Dente), Kirstie Alley referred to him as the most gloriously cool-looking stuntman in the history of stuntmen.

He is a co-founder of the BSA (Black Stuntmen's Association). He is also a member of Stunts Unlimited, and a Stuntmen's Hall of Fame inductee.

== Career ==
=== Acting ===
One of his very early film appearances was in the Alfred Hitchcock 1969 film Topaz. In 1970, he had a credited role in the "Run for the Money" episode of Daniel Boone, playing the part of Straight Arrow. In 1974, he was the Candy Man in the Isaac Hayes film Truck Turner. He played Carrot's man in the 1975 film The Ultimate Warrior, which starred Yul Brynner. He had a role as Goody in the 1976 film Car Wash which was directed by Michael Schultz. In the 1980 film Stir Crazy, he played the role of Ramon. He also appeared in Batman Returns as a mugger who was attacked by Catwoman. He was El Scorpio in Predator 2 (1990). He played the part of Anthony in John Carpenter's Vampires, which starred James Woods, Maximilian Schell and Gregory Sierra. In Lawrence Kasdan's film Grand Canyon, he plays a violent terrorist in a movie-within-the movie produced by Steve Martin.

=== Stunts ===
As a stuntman and a member of the BSA, Kingi recalled training with other members of the association on the weekends and being watched by police in unmarked cars. In an article published in the 13 March 2016 issue of The Daily Telegraph, he said that he and his fellow BSA stuntmen figured the police were thinking they were a Black Panther group.

Kingi has done stunt driving for the first Lethal Weapon film, following through 2 and 3, right through to Lethal Weapon 4. On the set of Lethal Weapon 4, Kingi assisted stunt coordinator Conrad E. Palmisano with putting together the action. It was Kingi who drove the car in the scene where it goes through the office and out the window.
