= Black Stuntmen's Association =

American film organization

- Founded: 1967
- Type: Film organization
- Location: Los Angeles, California
- Key people: Co-Founder Eddie Smith, Ernie Robinson, -Henry Kingi Founding Vice President
- Website: www.blackstuntmensassociation.com

The Black Stuntmen's Association is an organization that was formed as a result of policies that kept black stuntmen and stuntwomen from getting studio work. Founded in 1967, members of the association include co-founder Eddie Smith,Calvin Brown, Ernie Robinson, Alex Brown, Willie Harris, Henry Kingi, Joe Tilque, and William Upton.

The organization was successful in casting some of its members in television shows like Mission Impossible and The Mod Squad, and in films such as Halls of Anger, Dirty Harry, Across 110th Street and Live and Let Die.

== History ==
The association was founded after Smith asked Kingi and his fellow re-enactors of the all-black U.S. 10th Cavalry Unit, better known as the Buffalo Soldiers, if they would like to become stuntmen.

Joined by extras and former athletes, Smith and the others began training in Athens Park in South Los Angeles the LA Times reported, the stunts for black actors were performed by white stuntmen who were painted to look dark; the term for this practice is called "painting down". According to Willie Harris: "Nobody would train us, because they figured that we wasn't good enough and the white guys didn't want to be bothered with us because if we come in that would snap their paint down."

The group would train in a neighborhood near Compton, California, practicing their stunts until they were ready to display their skills and apply for film and television work. In an article published in the March 2016 issue of The Daily Telegraph, BSA member Henry Kingi recalled weekend training with other members of the association, and being watched by police in unmarked cars. He said that he and his fellow BSA stuntmen figured that the watching police were thinking they were another group of the Black Panthers. Bill Cosby refused to have "painted down" stunt doubles on the set of I Spy. Cosby instead used an African-American: Calvin Brown, who was also a founding member of the Black Stuntmen's Association.

By 1973, Black Stuntmen's Association had 15 members — 12 men and 3 women. A large boost to the success of the organization was the filming of the Warner Brothers Blaxploitation action thriller Cleopatra Jones, which had (at that time) a record $75,000 ($543,947 in 2025) budgeted for stuntwork and hired Ernie Robinson, founding president of the BSA, as stunt coordinator for the film. Other members of the Association in 1973 included: Peaches Jones, Louise Johnson, Evelyn Coffey, Ernie Robinson, Henry Kingi, Len Glascow, Wayne King, Melvin Jones, John Mitchell and Alex Brown.

In 2012, founding members were honored with the NAACP President's Award.

In 2014, members of the organization became angry when Warner Bros studio cast a white stuntwoman for its Fox show Gotham, to be a double for a black guest actress. The stunt woman had already been made up and had her hair and skin done to pass as the black actress. After Warner Bros were approached by a reporter from Deadline Hollywood, they didn't progress any further with using the white stunt woman.

Along with Lance Burton and Matthew Gray Gubler who are from other industries, Willie Harris was honored at the College of Fine Arts Hall of Fame for his work in the film industry.
