= Noi siamo angeli =

- Directed by: Ruggero Deodato
- Country of origin: Italy
- Original language: Italian
- No. of seasons: 1
- No. of episodes: 6

Original release
- Network: Rai Uno
- Release: February 9 – March 16, 1997

Noi siamo angeli (English: We are Angels) is an Italian action comedy television series, starring Bud Spencer and Philip Michael Thomas.

== Cast ==
- Bud Spencer: Bob / Father Orso
- Philip Michael Thomas: Joe / Father Zaccaria
- Kabir Bedi: Napoleon Duarte
- David Hess: Captain Delgado
- Mark Macaulay: Medina
- Philippe Leroy: Duval
- Renato Scarpa: Father Campana
- Erik Estrada: Professor Graziani
- Carlo Reali: President Aneto
- Ty Hardin: The Exorcist
- Richard Lynch: Don Alfonso Santiana
- Ramon Grado: Ortega

== Episodes ==
- We Are Angels - 01 - Jailbait
- We Are Angels - 02 - We Finally Take Off
- We Are Angels - 03 - Romancing Eldorado
- We Are Angels - 04 - Good Luck Comes From The Sky
- We Are Angels - 05 - Dollars
- We Are Angels - 06 - Dust

== links ==
- Noi siamo angeli at IMDb
