= Paul Ryan (actor) =

American actor

- Born: Bernard Paul Feldman; June 11, 1945; Philadelphia, Pennsylvania, U.S.
- Died: April 23, 2015 (aged 69); Burbank, California, U.S.
- Occupation: Actor

Paul Ryan (born Bernard Paul Feldman; June 11, 1945 – April 23, 2015) was an American actor, producer and television personality. His television roles included bit parts in Bewitched, Emergency!, Mission: Impossible, Night Court, Murder, She Wrote and Desperate Housewives. His film appearances include Coma (1978), The Promise (1979), Star 80 (1983), and Fast Forward (1985).

Ryan also worked as a correspondent for Entertainment Tonight and KTLA Morning News. Additionally, he hosted The Paul Ryan Show (1977-1992), an interview program in which Ryan interviewed a variety of guests from media, entertainment, and the arts, including Robin Williams and Gore Vidal.

== Death ==
Ryan died at the Providence Saint Joseph Medical Center in Burbank, California of leukemia in 2015, aged 69.

== Partial filmography ==
- Butterflies Are Free (1972) – Man in Mod Shop (uncredited)
- Coma (1978) – 1st Technician
- Starhops (1978) – Norman
- The Promise (1979) – Doctor Fenton
- The Last Word (1979) – Denise's Date
- Charlie Chan and the Curse of the Dragon Queen (1981) – Masten
- Star 80 (1983) – Radio Interviewer
- Fast Forward (1985) – Staffer
- High Strung (1991) – Game Show Host
