= Black Belt Jones =

1974 film by Robert Clouse

- Theatrical release poster
- Directed by: Robert Clouse
- Screenplay by: Oscar Williams
- Story by: Fred Weintraub; Alexandra Rose
- Produced by: Paul Heller; Fred Weintraub
- Starring: Jim Kelly; Gloria Hendry; Scatman Crothers
- Cinematography: Kent L. Wakeford
- Edited by: Michael Kahn
- Music by: Luchi DeJesus
- Production company: Sequoia Films
- Distributed by: Warner Bros.
- Release date: 29 March 1974
- Running time: 87 minutes
- Country: United States
- Language: English

Black Belt Jones is a 1974 American blaxploitation martial arts film directed by Robert Clouse and starring Jim Kelly and Gloria Hendry. The film is a spiritual successor to Clouse's prior film Enter the Dragon, in which Kelly had a supporting role. Here, Kelly features in his first starring role as the eponymous character, a local hero who fights the Mafia and a local drug dealer threatening his friend's dojo.

== Plot ==
The Mafia have learned of the construction of a new civic center, and have bought up all the land at the intended building site except for a karate dojo owned by "Pop" Byrd, who refuses to give up his property. The Don contacts an indebted drug dealer named "Pinky", who had laundered $250,000 from the Mafia that he'd subsequently loaned to Pop Byrd in order to get the dojo built. The Don orders Pinky to either get his money back or repossess the property. "Black Belt" Jones, an expert martial artist and hand-for-hire, is contacted by his old friend Pop to help protect the dojo. Though Pinky intends to offer Pop to trade the building in exchange for clearing their mutual debt to the Don, he accidentally kills him during an intimidation attempt. Before he dies, Pop tells Pinky that he couldn't give them the building even if he wanted to, as it belongs not to him but his daughter Sydney. Pinky sends thugs to the dojo to try and intimidate the other employees. Though he was unable to protect his friend, Jones and the other students effortlessly fend off the thugs.

Sydney returns home upon hearing of her father's sudden death. She's told about his debt to the Mafia, but refuses to sell the building, instead seeking vengeance on those responsible for her father's death. Sydney approaches Pinky's men and ends up in a brawl, managing to overcome them due to her own martial arts training. As retaliation, Pinky kidnaps one of the students, Quincy and demands for them to turn over the school or give him the money. Jones and Sydney, with support from the police department, rob the Mafia and proceed to give it to Pinky, framing him for the heist. They rescue Quincy, and Pinky proceeds to send his henchmen after Jones, who has to take them on all at once. Jones and his allies manage to subdue them, and they are subsequently arrested.

== Cast ==
- Jim Kelly as "Black Belt" Jones
- Gloria Hendry as Sydney Byrd
- Scatman Crothers as "Pop" Byrd
- Eric Laneuville as Quincy
- Alan Weeks as "Toppy"
- Andre Philippe as Don Steffano
- Vincent Barbi as "Big Tuna"
- Mel Novak as "Blue Eyes"
- Malik Carter as "Pinky"
- Eddie Smith as Oscar
- Earl Jolly Brown as "Jelly"
- Jac Emil as Marvin "Marv The Butcher"
- Earl Maynard as Bogart
- Marla Gibbs as Betty
- Ted Lange as Militant
- Clarence "Sonny" Barnes as "Tango"
- Esther Sutherland as Lucy
- Nate Esformes as Roberts

== Production ==
The Shaw Brothers, a major Hong Kong movie studio, initiated the U.S. Kung Fu film invasion with 1972's Five Fingers of Death and other films depicting realistic and brutal action.

In 1973, Cleopatra Jones connected martial arts in Blaxploitation with a strong Black female lead skillfully trained in karate.

As a teenager born in Paris, Kentucky and raised in Millersburg, Kentucky Jim Kelly grew up as an all-around athlete, and had a chance to become a professional football player. He gained his fame in the martial arts community through the 1971 Ed Parkers Internationals. After completing Enter the Dragon, he immediately signed a three-film deal with Warner Bros. Pictures. Black Belt Jones was filmed soon after. Kelly is still arguably most known for his role in Enter the Dragon.

== Reception ==
The film had a mixed reception. Some reviewers critiqued Kelly for trying to be too much like Bruce Lee, and thought the acting was only fair. Yet it still gained a cult film status later on.

== Soundtrack ==
Funk guitarist Dennis Coffey is credited for the film's soundtrack.

== Sequels ==
- Hot Potato: Twist the Tiger's Tail (1976), a side-story where Jim Kelly reprises his role as "Black Belt" Jones, where he tries to rescue an ambassador daughter who was captured in Thailand.
- Black Belt Jones 2: The Tattoo Connection (1978), a sequel where Jim Kelly returns as "Black Belt" Jones who is now a CIA agent under the alias "Lucas", he is sent on a mission in Hong Kong to recover a priceless diamond that was stolen by a local criminal organization.

== See also ==
- List of American films of 1974
