= Scarecrow (1973 film) =

American road comedy-drama film

- Theatrical release poster
- Directed by: Jerry Schatzberg
- Written by: Garry Michael White
- Produced by: Robert M. Sherman
- Starring: Gene Hackman; Al Pacino; Eileen Brennan; Richard Lynch
- Cinematography: Vilmos Zsigmond
- Edited by: Evan A. Lottman
- Music by: Fred Myrow
- Distributed by: Warner Bros.
- Release date: April 11, 1973 (New York City)
- Running time: 112 minutes
- Country: United States
- Language: English
- Box office: $4 million (US/Canada rentals)

Scarecrow is a 1973 American road comedy-drama film directed by Jerry Schatzberg and starring Gene Hackman and Al Pacino. The story involves the relationship between two men who travel from California seeking to start a business in Pittsburgh.

At the 1973 Cannes Film Festival, the film tied for the Grand Prix du Festival International du Film (now Palme d'Or), the highest honor, with Alan Bridges' The Hireling.

== Plot ==
Two vagabonds—Max Millan, a short-tempered ex-convict, and Francis Lionel "Lion" Delbuchi, a childlike former sailor—meet on the road in California and agree to become partners in a car-wash business when they reach Pittsburgh. Lion is traveling to Detroit to see a child whom he has never met and make amends with the child's mother, Annie, to whom he has sent all of the money that he had earned while at sea. Max agrees to take a detour on his way to Pittsburgh, where the bank to which Max has been sending all his seed money is located.

While visiting Max's sister in Denver, the pair's antics land them in a prison farm for a month. Max blames Lion for their incarceration and shuns him. Lion is befriended by an inmate named Riley, who eventually tries to sexually assault and physically ravage him. When Lion resists, Riley beats him, breaks his teeth and blinds him in one eye, which emotionally traumatizes him. Max rekindles his friendship with Lion and becomes his protector, eventually exacting revenge by fighting Riley.

After their release, Max and Lion continue to have a profound effect on each other, although they have both undergone personal transformations, and their roles have shifted. Lion is still traumatized, no longer carefree nor able to smile, and Max loosens his high-strung aggression, performing a mock striptease to defuse a fight at a bar and make Lion laugh again.

When Max and Lion finally arrive in Detroit, Lion finds a payphone and calls Annie, now married to another man and raising Lion's five-year-old son. Annie is still furious with Lion for having abandoned her, and lies that she miscarried their son. Lion is devastated but feigns joy with Max about having a son. Shortly afterward, Lion experiences a psychological breakdown while playing with children in a city park, and becomes catatonic. Max makes a promise to Lion, now in a psychiatric hospital, that he will do anything to help him and boards a train to Pittsburgh with a round-trip ticket.

== Cast ==
- Gene Hackman as Max Millan
- Al Pacino as Francis Lionel "Lion" Delbuchi
- Eileen Brennan as Darlene
- Dorothy Tristan as Coley
- Ann Wedgeworth as "Frenchy"
- Richard Lynch as Riley
- Penelope Allen as Annie Gleason
- Richard Hackman as Mickey Grenwood
- Al Cingolani as Skipper
- Rutanya Alda as Woman In Camp

== Production ==
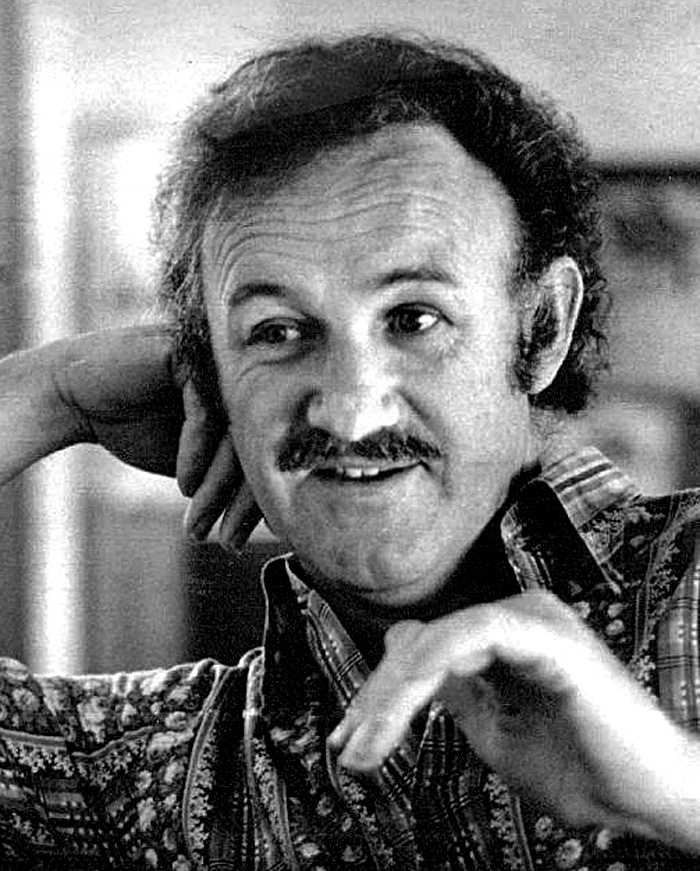
Gene Hackman accompanied Al Pacino in disguise as beggars to develop the performances.

Warner Bros. approved the project, looking for a small-budget film after executives became less confident in the success of larger projects. Director Jerry Schatzberg's preference for the roles of Max and Lion were Gene Hackman and Al Pacino. Schatzberg had worked with Pacino on The Panic in Needle Park (1971).

To understand their characters, Pacino and Hackman donned costumes and posed as beggars in San Francisco. However, Pacino, an advocate of method acting, found that his techniques conflicted with those of Hackman, who would be silent before shooting, while Pacino paced. Although Hackman enjoyed the production, Pacino later commented, "It wasn't the easiest working with Hackman, who I love as an actor."

== Reception ==
On the review aggregator website Rotten Tomatoes, 77% of 35 critics' reviews are positive. The website's consensus reads: "If its dramatic dressings are a tad threadbare, Scarecrow survives on the strength of its lead performances and Vilmos Zsigmond's cinematography." Metacritic, which uses a weighted average, assigned the film a score of 72 out of 100, based on nine critics, indicating "generally favorable" reviews.

At the 1973 Cannes Film Festival, the film won the interim equivalent of the Palme d'Or, the Grand Prix du Festival International du Film, shared with The Hireling, directed by Alan Bridges. It also won Best Non-European Film at Denmark's 1974 Bodil Awards. In the U.S., Scarecrow was a box-office bomb.

Roger Ebert of the Chicago Sun-Times awarded the film three stars out of four, comparing the story to those of Of Mice and Men and Midnight Cowboy, and positively reviewed the performances of Pacino and Hackman, as well as the writing and setting.

In The New York Times, Vincent Canby called Max and Lion "classic drifters" and "marvelously realized characters".

In a review of Scarecrow on its 2013 re-release, Peter Bradshaw of The Guardian described the film as "a freewheeling masterpiece", describing Hackman and Pacino as giving "the performances of their lives".

Peter Biskind of Seven Days magazine described the film as of "secondary" significance in his book Easy Riders, Raging Bulls.

By 2012, Scarecrow was among the best-reviewed films in Schatzberg's career. Schatzberg recruited Seth Cohen to write a sequel, and a screenplay was completed by 2013. The sequel would be set years after Scarecrow, with Max and computer worker Lion reuniting, and Lion learning that his son is alive. The sequel project was complicated by the studio's lack of support and Hackman's retirement from acting.

== See also ==
- List of American films of 1973
