= The Promise (1979 film) =

1979 film by Gilbert Cates

- 1990s VHS cover
- Directed by: Gilbert Cates
- Written by: Garry Michael White (screenplay); Fred Weintraub; Paul Heller (source story); Danielle Steel (novel conversion)
- Produced by: Fred Weintraub; Paul Heller
- Starring: Kathleen Quinlan; Stephen Collins; Beatrice Straight; Laurence Luckinbill; William Prince; Bibi Besch; Michael O'Hare
- Cinematography: Ralph Woolsey
- Edited by: Peter E. Berger
- Music by: David Shire
- Distributed by: Universal Pictures
- Release date: June 8, 1979
- Running time: 97 minutes
- Country: United States
- Language: English
- Box office: $11.6 million

The Promise is a 1979 American romantic drama film released by Universal Pictures which starred Kathleen Quinlan, Stephen Collins, and Beatrice Straight. It was directed by Gilbert Cates and produced by Fred Weintraub and Paul Heller. Weintraub and Heller also wrote the source story, which Garry Michael White dramatized; the resultant film was novelized by Danielle Steel. It was remade in India as the Hindi film Yeh Vaada Raha (1982).

== Plot ==
In a rich-boy/poor-girl story along the lines of Love Story, college students Michael Hillyard (Collins) and Nancy McAllister (Quinlan) are in love. While visiting a park overlooking the Atlantic Ocean, they hide a costume jewelry necklace under a large rock, promising that they will love each other as long as it remains undisturbed—which they expect to be forever.

Michael goes to his mother, Marion (Straight), and announces his plans to marry Nancy, but she thinks Nancy will hurt Michael's career with their family business. Michael storms out of his mother's home, calls Nancy and makes plans to elope. He asks his best friend Ben Avery (Michael O'Hare) to be best man.

On the way to the ceremony, the three are involved in a horrific car crash. Ben escapes with minor injuries, but Michael is rendered comatose, and Nancy suffers severe facial injuries. While Nancy is still groggy and heavily bandaged, Marion makes an underhanded deal with her: Marion will send Nancy to California and pay a plastic surgeon to restore her face; Dr. Peter Gregson (Luckinbill) is the surgeon Marion has chosen, since she can also, and eventually does, bribe him heavily to serve as her barrier against Michael. The catch is that Nancy will not be permitted to return to Boston or contact Michael again unless he contacts her, with the implication being that he will decide if he wants the relationship to continue after the trauma of the accident. Believing that Michael will find her once he wakes up, Nancy agrees. However, when Michael comes out of his coma, Marion lies to him, telling him that Nancy had died in the accident.

Time passes, and Nancy undergoes a series of successful surgeries to repair her face (although she looks significantly different than before the accident). Once healed, she changes her name to Marie Adamson and becomes a successful photographer. Michael becomes a successful architect with his family's business, designing multimillion-dollar business skyscrapers. His company takes a contract to design a building in San Francisco. Ben, who also now works for the company, visits a gallery where Marie's photographs are being displayed. He approaches Marie; she recognizes him, but he does not recognize her. He tries to talk to her about her doing photographs to be displayed in new buildings being designed. Once she learns of Michael's involvement, she refuses to have anything to do with the project.

Michael sees samples of Marie's work and finds himself inexplicably drawn to it. He begins pursuing Marie to engage her to do the project, unaware that she is actually Nancy. Initially, Marie refuses, but eventually Michael starts to wear her down. Marie asks him about the scar above his eyebrow (from the accident). Michael becomes visibly tense, and stoically dismisses it, saying it was from "a small accident" that he has now forgotten. Marie takes his comments to mean that he has forgotten about her (Nancy). She tells Michael she will have nothing to do with him, leaving him in confusion. She goes to Dr. Gregson, the plastic surgeon who repaired her face and with whom she is now involved romantically, and tells him she will be finished with her old life after making one last trip to the east coast.

Later that evening, Michael searches for Marie. Eventually he goes to the home of the plastic surgeon. There, he sees a completed painting which Nancy had started during their romance. He finally realizes "Marie Adamson" is actually Nancy McAllister, and that his mother Marion had lied to him.

In the climactic scene, Nancy reaches the rock. After a struggle, she dislodges it, only to discover that the necklace is not there. While she tries to understand, Michael appears with the necklace in hand, having gotten there first. They clear the misunderstanding and reunite with a passionate kiss.

== Cast ==
- Kathleen Quinlan as Nancy McAllister/Marie Adamson
- Stephen Collins as Michael Hillyard
- Beatrice Straight as Marion Hillyard
- Laurence Luckinbill as Dr. Peter Gregson
- William Prince as George Calloway
- Bibi Besch as Dr. Faye Allison
- Michael O'Hare as Ben Avery
- Paul Ryan as Dr. Fenton
- Michael Collins as Basketball Fan

== Production ==
Director Gilbert Cates originally planned to cast two different actresses to play the same character before and after the accident, but changed his mind after meeting Kathleen Quinlan. When playing Nancy before the accident Quinlan wore a prosthetic nose and chin, a wig, false eyebrows and false teeth, but went without the special effects makeup when playing the character post-surgery.

== Musical score ==
The film features a haunting theme composed by David Shire. The theme song lyrics were jointly written by Alan and Marilyn Bergman, and the resulting selection, titled "I'll Never Say Goodbye," was performed by Melissa Manchester. The song was nominated for an Oscar in 1979, resulting in Melissa Manchester having two movie theme songs "Through the Eyes of Love" (from Ice Castles) and "I'll Never Say Goodbye" (from The Promise) nominated for Best Original Song in the same year at the 52nd Academy Awards (the first artist to do this was Maureen McGovern, with 'Wherever Love Takes Me' from 'Gold' and 'We May Never Love Like this Again' from 'Towering Inferno'). But the Oscar for Best Original Song instead went to Shire (music) and Norman Gimbel (lyrics) for the song "It Goes Like It Goes" from the film Norma Rae, performed by Jennifer Warnes.

"I'll Never Say Goodbye" has been covered by several other artists.

- In 1979, Debby Boone covered the song on her self-titled album Debby Boone.
- In 2011, Barbra Streisand covered the song for her thirty-third studio album What Matters Most.
- A duet between Ogie Alcasid and Regine Velasquez was released as a single in the Philippines.

== Reception ==
Vincent Canby of The New York Times wrote "The members of the cast are undercut by both material and direction," explaining that Kathleen Quinlan "is shortstopped not only by ridiculous lines but also by makeup that gives her the plastic look of a face-lift even before the accident so (I assume) she'll look fairly normal later." Gene Siskel of the Chicago Tribune gave the film two stars out of four, writing that the film had "a predictable conclusion" and that Kathleen Quinlan was "wasted here in a thoroughly artificial role." Kevin Thomas of the Los Angeles Times wrote that the film "is so awful you wonder how it ever got made. Quite unintentionally it works as an often hilarious parody of the women's pictures of the '40s, a melodramatic genre decidedly out of step with today's liberated heroines." Ruth McCormick wrote in Cineaste: "This is that great rarity—the silly film that takes itself so seriously that it's funny. It makes Love Story look like Now, Voyager, but keeps your interest with its own insane momentum."

There was, however, a positive review in Variety, which found Quinlan "pretty convincing" but thought Beatrice Straight gave "easily, the performance in the film" and added "Gilbert Cates comes very close to making out-and-out soap opera not only endurable but believable."
