= The Good Life (1971 TV series) =

American sitcom of the 1970s

- Genre: Sitcom
- Based on: The Good Life by Douglass Wallop
- Developed by: Lawrence J. Cohen; Fred Freeman
- Directed by: Claudio Guzmán
- Starring: Larry Hagman; Donna Mills; David Wayne; Hermione Baddeley
- Opening theme: The Good Life performed by Tony Orlando and Dawn
- Composers: Jack Elliott; Allyn Ferguson
- Country of origin: United States
- Original language: English
- No. of seasons: 1
- No. of episodes: 15

Production
- Executive producer: Lee Rich
- Producer: Claudio Guzmán
- Camera setup: Multi-camera
- Running time: 25 minutes
- Production companies: Humble Productions; Lorimar Productions; Screen Gems

Original release
- Network: NBC
- Release: September 18, 1971 – January 8, 1972

The Good Life is an American sitcom that was aired on NBC as part of its 1971–72 lineup. The series stars Larry Hagman and Donna Mills, and was produced by Lorimar, in association with Screen Gems.

== Synopsis ==
The Good Life is the story of a middle class American couple, the Millers (Hagman and Mills), who have tired of their mundane existence. Instead of following the time-honored premise of "hitting the road" to seek adventure or engaging in a stereotypical period activity such as joining a communal farm, they just decide to seek new employment as the live-in butler and cook of a millionaire industrialist, Charles Dutton. He notices that they are not particularly talented at their jobs, but finds them to be agreeable enough. Their limited skills most definitely are not enough for his stuffy sister Grace, however, and she constantly works to get them fired. Dutton's teenaged son, Nick, is the only one aware of what the Millers are doing in their new roles, but, finding great fun in their situation, he helps them to become accustomed to the social etiquette of high society and the wealthy in an effort to improve their skills in their roles.

The theme song was the 1962 pop song The Good Life, written by Sacha Distel and Jack Reardon, and sung under the titles by Tony Orlando.

This program did not attract a large viewership and was cancelled at mid-season. It was replaced by the action drama Emergency!.

A decade later, Hagman and Mills were reunited onscreen when he guest-starred on Knots Landing, on which Mills had become a series regular in 1980. Being a spin-off from Dallas, Knots Landing featured Hagman in the role of J. R. Ewing, who was often in cahoots with Mills' character Abby Cunningham. Both series were also Lorimar productions. David Wayne would also reunite with Hagman on Dallas, where he originated the role of Willard "Digger" Barnes.

The British television series The Good Life was released as Good Neighbors in American syndication to avoid confusion with this earlier series.

== Cast ==
- Larry Hagman as Albert Miller
- Donna Mills as Jane Miller
- David Wayne as Charles Dutton
- Hermione Baddeley as Grace Dutton
- Danny Goldman as Nick Dutton

== Episodes ==
| No. | Title | Directed by | Written by | Original release date |
|---|---|---|---|---|
| 1 | "One of Our Rolls is Missing" | Bruce Bilson | William Raynor & Myles Wilder | September 18, 1971 |
Albert attempts to sell the Duttons' Rolls-Royce automobile, but ends up having it stolen.
| 2 | "Jane's Double Life" | Ron Winston | Albert E. Lewin | September 25, 1971 |
Albert talks Jane into going to a charity ball with his employer's son.
| 3 | "The Chess Game" | Claudio Guzmán | Susan Harris | October 2, 1971 |
Posing as the owner of the Dutton's estate, Albert is challenged to a chess match by a former friend from school.
| 4 | "The Wrecked Butler" | Ron Winston | William Bickley | October 9, 1971 |
After Albert breaks his leg, he discovers that his efficient substitute is endangering his chances keeping his job.
| 5 | "The Vacation" | Claudio Guzman | Susan Harris | October 16, 1971 |
Albert attempts to convince the Duttons to take Jane and him along to the French Riviera in order to avoid spending time with his mother-in-law.
| 6 | "The Commodore Cometh" | Larry Hagman | Ron Friedman | October 23, 1971 |
Mr. Dutton's uncle arrives and reveals his plan to dismiss his nephew as head of Dutton Industries and replace him with Albert.
| 7 | "The Burglar Alarm" | Jay Sandrich | Ron Friedman | October 30, 1971 |
Albert attempts to outsmart a master burglar who has been ransacking mansions and beating up servants.
| 8 | "Dutton's Retirement" | Bruce Bilson | Bernie Kahn | November 6, 1971 |
After Albert convinces Dutton to retire in order to take it easy, but he soon discovers that he's only created more problems.
| 9 | "The Speedometer Strain" | Claudio Guzman | Lloyd Turner & Gordon Mitchell | November 13, 1971 |
If Albert is able to teach Grace Dutton how to drive, he and Jane will be rewarded with a trip to Hawaii.
| 10 | "Mansion for Sale" | Hal Cooper | Art Baer & Ben Joelson | November 27, 1971 |
After Dick leaves home in order to seek his independence, the Dutton mansion goes up for sale.
| 11 | "A Tremendous Sense of Loyalty" | Charles R. Rondeau | Bernie Kahn | December 4, 1971 |
J. Carleton Wedemeyer (Robert Cummings), whose name Albert used as a reference to obtain his job, arrives.
| 12 | "Butterfield Ate" | Claudio Guzman | Lloyd Turner & Gordon Mitchell | December 11, 1971 |
While babysitting a friend's pet lion, Albert attempts to keep the news a secret from the Duttons.
| 13 | "Albert Gets Rich" | Joseph Goodman | Susan Harris | December 18, 1971 |
Albert wins $250,000 and decides to immediately quit his job and retire.
| 14 | "The Gardners" | Claudio Guzman | Lawrence J. Cohen & Fred Freeman | December 25, 1971 |
Attempting to cut back on household expenses, Albert runs into trouble with the estate's gardeners.
| 15 | "Dial 'M' for Merger" | Larry Hagman | Lloyd Turner & Gordon Mitchell | January 8, 1972 |
A spoiled eight-year-old threatens to ruin things for Albert and Jane.
