= Linda Lovelace for President =

1975 American comedy film

- Directed by: Claudio Guzmán
- Written by: Jack S. Margolis
- Produced by: David Winters; Charles Stroud
- Starring: Linda Lovelace
- Cinematography: Robert Birchall
- Edited by: Richard Greer
- Music by: Bic Mac & The Truckers
- Distributed by: General Film Corp.
- Release date: March 1, 1975
- Running time: 95 minutes
- Country: United States
- Language: English
- Budget: $1 million

Linda Lovelace for President (initially titled Hot Neon in the UK) is a 1975 American comedy film directed by Claudio Guzmán and starring Linda Lovelace, who achieved notoriety as the central character in the most profitable X-rated film of all time, Deep Throat (1972).

== Plot ==
A committee of independent U.S. political party leaders have gathered to join forces and select a candidate for the upcoming presidential election. One of the committee members flippantly suggests nominating Linda Lovelace. The committee approaches the porn star, who agrees to be the flag bearer of the newly formed Upright Party. Lovelace’s campaign takes her on a cross-country tour, where she meets voters in stops ranging from crowded big cities to isolated rural towns. Lovelace’s popularity, however, threatens the Washington, D.C. establishment, and her political rivals dispatch a hit man known as the Assassinator to bring a fatal end to the Lovelace campaign.

== Cast ==
- Linda Lovelace as Herself
- Micky Dolenz as Lieutenant Fenwick
- Scatman Crothers as "Super Black"
- Val Bisoglio as Reverend Billy Easter
- Joey Forman as Chow Ming
- Garry Goodrow as Adolph Von Luftwafter
- Fuddle Bagley as Abdul Ali Umagooma
- Jack DeLeon as Captain Neldor
- Chuck McCann as The Assassinator
- Vaughn Meader as Reverend Sacrifice
- Monte Landis as B.S.
- Marty Ingels as Ronald Trixie
- Art Metrano as The Sheik
- Jack Collins as John "Honest John"
- Morgan Upton as The Veep
- Danny Goldman as Bruce Whippoorwill
- Louis Quinn as Dirty Guy #1
- Joe E. Ross as Dirty Guy #2
- Robert Symonds as Uncle Sam
- Earl Jolly Brown as Polmes
- Stanley Myron Handelman as Messenger
- Stafford Repp as Dirty Old Man
- Diane Lee Hart as Harem Girl
- Robbie Lee as Hillbilly Girl with Veep
- Jeff Rogers as Star Pupil

== Production ==
After the 1972 release of Deep Throat, Linda Lovelace enjoyed a brief flurry of celebrity notoriety while dating choreographer David Winters of West Side Story fame, which included appearances at the Academy Awards ceremony with Winters and the opening day of the racing season at Ascot Racecourse plus author credit for two best-selling books that played on her status as a pornographic icon. By 1974, however, her career stalled. An R-rated sequel to her breakthrough film, Deep Throat Part II, was commercially unsuccessful, and her attempts to establish success as a nightclub singer and stage actress were considered failures. The film Linda Lovelace for President was designed by Winters to establish the star’s crossover appeal with mainstream moviegoers. Winters came up with the idea for the film after observing the strong positive reaction that college students exhibited towards Linda Lovelace during her speeches at various college campuses.

The film brought in several recognizable actors for guest appearances. Featured in the film were Micky Dolenz of The Monkees, whom Winters knew from the days he directed and choreographed two episodes of The Monkees, as a near-sighted bus driver, Scatman Crothers as a pool hall hustler, Joe E. Ross as a political operative, Vaughn Meader as a preacher who lusts after Lovelace, and Chuck McCann as The Assassinator. However, much of the film played up Lovelace's starring role in Deep Throat with jokey reminders of the X-rated film's oral sex subject matter (i.e., the slogan for the Lovelace campaign is "A vote for Linda is a blow for democracy").

Winters was one of the film’s producers.

Parts of the film were shot on the campus of the University of Kansas in Lawrence, Kansas and at Swope Park in Kansas City, Missouri.

== Reception ==
Linda Lovelace for President was not commercially successful and the film was Lovelace's final screen appearance.

Over the years, bootleg versions of Linda Lovelace for President were released on home video. A commercial DVD version was scheduled for release in August 2008 on the Dark Sky/MPI label.

== See also ==
- List of American films of 1975
