= Garry Michael White =

American playwright and screenwriter

Garry Michael White is an American playwright and screenwriter. He wrote the screenplay for Scarecrow, which shared the Grand Prix with The Hireling at the 1973 Cannes Film Festival. White also co-wrote the 1976 action film Sky Riders and the romantic drama The Promise in 1979. Has a new full-length play "Wish Mirage" which was filmed in a staged reading presentation in New York in December 2020.

== Filmography ==
=== Film ===
Year	Title	Director	Writer	Notes
1973	Scarecrow	No	Yes	
1976	Sky Riders	No	Yes	
1979	The Promise	No	Yes	

=== Television ===
Year	Title	Director	Writer	Notes
1988	Midnight Caller	No	Yes	1 episode
1991	Shoot First: A Cop's Vengeance	No	Yes	
