= Stir Crazy (film) =

1980 film by Sidney Poitier

- Theatrical release poster
- Directed by: Sidney Poitier
- Written by: Bruce Jay Friedman
- Produced by: Hannah Weinstein
- Starring: Gene Wilder; Richard Pryor
- Cinematography: Fred Schuler
- Edited by: Harry Keller
- Music by: Tom Scott
- Production company: Columbia Pictures
- Distributed by: Columbia Pictures
- Release date: December 12, 1980
- Running time: 111 minutes
- Country: United States
- Language: English
- Budget: $10 million
- Box office: $101 million (USA)

Stir Crazy is a 1980 American black comedy film directed by Sidney Poitier, written by Bruce Jay Friedman, produced by Hannah Weinstein, and starring Gene Wilder and Richard Pryor as Skip Donahue and Harry Monroe, two unemployed friends who are given 125-year prison sentences after getting framed for a bank robbery. While in prison they befriend other prison inmates. The film reunited Wilder and Pryor, who had appeared previously in the 1976 comedy thriller film Silver Streak. The film was released in the United States on December 12, 1980, to mixed reviews, and was a major financial success, grossing $101 million against a $10 million budget.

== Plot ==
In New York City, aspiring actor Harry Monroe is fired from his job as a waiter when cooks accidentally use his stash of marijuana as oregano at a dinner party. His friend, aspiring playwright Skip Donahue, is fired from his job as a store detective when he incorrectly accuses a woman of shoplifting. The two friends are sitting in a bar, discussing what to do with their lives, when they suddenly notice two men arguing loudly with each other. One is a short Latino man who claims that the meter showed $8.50, but he was given only one dollar. The other is a tall white guy who insists that he paid with a ten-dollar bill. The argument turns into a fight, and since none of the customers steps in, Skip decides to approach them and try to make peace between them. Meanwhile, the man who has been knocked to the ground finds a pair of pliers on the floor. He quickly picks them up and grabs the bad boy's family jewels with them, squeezing it hard. Skip introduces the two men to each other and tries to ease the tension between them. Eventually, as a result of the conversation and the physical coercion, the scammer-thief takes a real ten-dollar bill out of his wallet and asks the taxi driver to keep it along with the one-dollar bill he had given him earlier. Having received what he was rightfully owed, the Hispanic man lets him go and quickly leaves. After the incident, Harry scolds Skip because he could have been injured in the fight. They continue their conversation and eventually decide to leave New York and head to Los Angeles together, specifically Hollywood, to try their luck there. Soon, they head west in a battered Dodge camper van.

In Arizona, Skip gets the pair a gig performing a song and dance routine dressed in woodpecker costumes as a promotion for a bank. While they are on a break, two other men steal the costumes and rob the bank, and Harry and Skip are arrested and convicted of the crime. They are given 125-year sentences and sent to a maximum-security correctional facility, and advised to be patient and wait for the examination of their case.

In prison, after a failed effort of faking insanity, they make friends with bank robber Jesus Ramirez and openly gay murderer Rory Schultebrand. After three months, Skip and Harry visit Warden Walter Beatty and Deputy Warden Ward Wilson, the head guard, with a list of grievances. The unsympathetic Wilson orders Skip to ride a mechanical bull, which he does at full power. Beatty then orders Wilson to "invite" Skip to compete in the prison's annual rodeo competition.

Jesus and Rory inform Harry and Skip that the rodeo is a crooked operation run by Beatty and the neighboring prison: the money from the rodeo, which is supposed to go to the prisoners, ends up in the wardens' pockets. However, the four hatch a plan for escape involving Skip refusing to participate until Beatty provides concessions. They warn Skip that he will be tortured by Beatty, but he withstands the abuse, including a week in the "hot box" and he and Harry being forced to share a cell with hulking, seemingly mute mass serial killer Grossberger.

Harry and Skip are visited by their lawyer Len Garber, who introduces them to his law partner, his cousin Meredith, to whom Skip is attracted. Later, Skip meets with Beatty to make a deal: In exchange for his rodeo participation, Skip requests his own crew (Harry, Jesus, Rory, and Grossberger), along with a shared cell for the five of them. Beatty agrees, directing Wilson to have a guard watch them concurrently. Wilson orders his esteemed inmate colleague, former rodeo champion Jack Graham, to monitor Skip and his team and assures Graham that Skip will not survive the rodeo.

Skip, Harry, Jesus, Rory, and Grossberger acquire tools for their escape; meanwhile, Meredith gets a job as a waitress in a local strip club searching for feasible suspects and encounters the real bank robbers. At the rodeo stadium, every member of Skip's team except Grossberger retreats through a secret path, taking them through air vents to be met by either Jesus's wife Teresa or brother Ramon. Once through, they put on their disguises and re-enter the grounds as audience members.

Skip ends up in a tie with rival champion Caesar Geronimo, and the two enter a "sudden death" event to win the prize: a bag of money tied to the horns of a large Brahman bull. Skip suggests that they cooperate and give the money to the prisoners; while Skip distracts the bull, Caesar wins and throws the bag to the inmates, enraging Beatty and Wilson and allowing Skip to escape.

At a secret meeting spot, Jesus and Rory bid Harry and Skip farewell as they leave for Mexico. Harry and Skip get in their car but are intercepted by Garber and Meredith. She tells Harry and Skip that the police have arrested the actual culprits, and the pair return to their genuine idea of going to Hollywood. Skip asks Meredith to go with them, and she agrees to that.

== Cast ==
- Gene Wilder as Skipper "Skip" Donahue
- Richard Pryor as Harold "Harry" Monroe
- Georg Stanford Brown as Rory Schultebrand
- JoBeth Williams as Meredith
- Miguel Ángel Suárez as Jesus Ramirez
- Craig T. Nelson as Deputy Warden Ward Wilson
- Barry Corbin as Warden Walter Beatty
- Charles Weldon as Blade
- Nicolas Coster as Warden Henry Sampson
- Joel Brooks as Len Garber
- Jonathan Banks as Jack Graham
- Erland Van Lidth as Grossberger
- Lewis Van Bergen as Guard
- Lee Purcell as Susan
- Karmin Murcelo as Teresa Ramirez
- Franklyn Ajaye as Hospital Man
- Estelle Omens as Mrs. R.H. Broache
- Peter Looney as Kicker
- Cedrick Hardman as Big Mean
- Henry Kingi as Ramon Ramirez
- Joseph Massengale as Caesar Geronimo
- Herman Poppe as Alex
- Luis Ávalos as Chico
- Esther Sutherland as Sissie
- Pamela Poitier as Mavis
- Rod McCary as Minister
- Claudia Cron as Joy
- Donna Benz as Nancy
- Grand L. Bush as Slowpoke
- Alvin Ing as Doctor
- Gwen Van Dam as Mrs. Beatty
- Herbert Hirschman as Man at Dinner Party
- Mickey Jones as Guard
- Billy Beck as Flycatcher

== Production ==
The film was shot in Manhattan, New York; Burbank, California; St. George, Utah; Florence and Tucson, Arizona in 56 days from March 13 to May 23, 1980. With Stir Crazy, Richard Pryor became the first black actor to earn a million dollars for a single film.

== Reception ==
=== Box office ===
The film was a box office success, setting a record opening week for Columbia Pictures of $12,972,131 and then setting a studio record $15,336,245 the following week, including a studio record single day gross of $3,237,279. It went on to gross $101,300,000, being the third-highest-grossing film of 1980, behind The Empire Strikes Back and 9 to 5. It was Columbia's third film to gross $100 million and third highest-grossing film of all time, after Close Encounters of the Third Kind and Kramer vs. Kramer. The box office total marked the first time a film directed by an African-American earned more than $100 million.

=== Critical response ===
On Rotten Tomatoes, Stir Crazy has an approval rating of 69% based on 16 reviews. On Metacritic it has a score of 56% based on reviews from 6 critics.

Roger Ebert gave the film two stars out of four and wrote that it "starts strong", but "once Wilder and Pryor are thrown into prison, it seems to lose its way" as "the movie gets bogged down in developing its own plot. That is not always the best thing for a comedy to do, because if we're not laughing, it hardly matters what happens to the plot." Vincent Canby of The New York Times panned the film as "a prison comedy of quite stunning humorlessness" which "appears to have been improvised, badly, more often than written." Kevin Thomas of the Los Angeles Times wrote, "Sidney Poitier has directed Stir Crazy as if it were as much fun as his previous comedies—e.g., Uptown Saturday Night. But no amount of bouncy good-naturedness can disguise the stretched-thin quality of the material." Gene Siskel of the Chicago Tribune was positive, giving the film three stars out of four and writing, "There are explosively funny moments in this prison comedy that wouldn't be there without Pryor, who radiates a comic energy in a scene even when he's merely standing still." Variety wrote, "The extensive comic talents of Richard Pryor take a below average film like Stir Crazy and make it into an often funny and saleable picture." Gary Arnold of The Washington Post also liked the film, stating that it "blends several inventive, high-spirited performing talents into a tangy, cheerful entertainment." David Ansen of Newsweek found the film "only intermittently funny", remarking that writer Bruce Jay Friedman is "trying for a formula film and can't land on the right formula. Is it a buddy movie, a caper comedy, a parody of prison films, an urban-cowboy neo-Western, a New York vs. Sun Belt comedy? Unfortunately it's more of a shambles than any of the above, albeit a fairly genial one."

The film was nominated for a Golden Raspberry Award for Worst Supporting Actress for Georg Stanford Brown in drag at the 1st Golden Raspberry Awards.

== Television series ==
American television network CBS adapted Stir Crazy as a weekly series as part of its 1985 fall lineup. This version starred Larry Riley as Harry Fletcher and Joseph Guzaldo as Skip Harrington, who were wrongfully convicted and sentenced to 132 years in prison. While working on a chain gang, they escape and set out after Crawford (Marc Silver), the man who had actually committed the crime for which they had been sentenced.

None of the people involved in the film had a major role in this series. It was pulled from the CBS fall lineup in October 1985, the month after its premiere, and put on hiatus. It returned in a new time slot in December 1985 and a few more episodes were aired, also to low ratings. The program was permanently cancelled after the January 7, 1986 broadcast.

== See also ==
- List of American films of 1980
