= Baker's Dozen (TV series) =

US television program

- Genre: Sitcom
- Created by: Sonny Grosso
- Developed by: Philip Rosenberg; Stuart Rosenberg
- Starring: Ron Silver; Cindy Weintraub; Alan Weeks
- Country of origin: United States
- Original language: English
- No. of seasons: 1
- No. of episodes: 6

Production
- Executive producers: Sonny Grosso; Larry Jacobson
- Producers: Nick Arnold; Kenneth Utt
- Running time: 30 minutes
- Production companies: Columbia Pictures Television; Grosso-Jacobson Productions

Original release
- Network: CBS
- Release: March 17 – June 30, 1982

Baker's Dozen is a 1982 American sitcom that aired on Wednesday nights at 9:30 pm on CBS from March 17 to April 21, followed by a single episode on June 30.

== Synopsis ==
Filmed on location in New York City, the series centered around the off-beat antics of an undercover anti-crime unit of the NYPD.

== Cast ==
- Ron Silver as Mike Locasale
- Cindy Weintraub as Terry Munson
- Alan Weeks as Otis Kelly
- Sam McMurray as Harve Schoendorf
- Thomas Quinn as Sgt. Martin
- Doris Belack as Captain Florence Baker

== Episodes ==
No.	Title	Directed by	Written by	Original release date
1	"Pilot"	Bill Persky	Philip Rosenberg & Stuart Rosenberg	March 17, 1982
2	"A Class by Himself"	Bill Persky	Philip Rosenberg	March 24, 1982
3	"Dear John"	Tony Mordente	Nick Arnold	March 31, 1982
4	"What a Difference a Cop Makes"	Edward S. Feldman	Nick Arnold	April 7, 1982
5	"I Was Told You Were a Racetrack"	Tony Mordente	Nick Arnold	April 21, 1982
6	"Sauce for the Goose"	Edward S. Feldman	Gary Gilbert	June 30, 1982
