= Paul Heller =

American film producer (1927–2020)

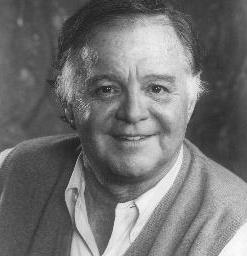
- Born: Paul M. Heller; 25 September 1927; New York City, New York, United States
- Died: 28 December 2020 (aged 93); Los Angeles, California, United States
- Occupation: Film producer
- Years active: 1953−2010

Paul Heller (also known as Paul M. Heller; 25 September 1927 – 28 December 2020) was an American film producer residing in Southern California. His best known movies include Enter the Dragon, Withnail and I, My Left Foot, The Annihilation of Fish, Skin Game, Hot Potato, The Promise, The Barony, Black Belt Jones, and David and Lisa.

== Biography ==
=== Film production ===
His debut as a film producer was David and Lisa, which received two Oscar nominations. He was the executive producer of 1990's Oscar winner My Left Foot, which earned five Academy Award nominations and Oscars for Best Actor and Best Supporting Actress.

His film The Eavesdropper won acclaim as Best Film at Mar del Plata and honors at both the New York and London Film Festivals. It was also nominated for Best Foreign Film at the French Awards as was his film Secret Ceremony, starring Elizabeth Taylor and Mia Farrow.

Heller worked as a Warner Bros. executive, overseeing such films as Skin Game, starring James Garner, and Dirty Harry, starring Clint Eastwood.

In 1973, Heller founded Sequoia Pictures, Inc., a production house affiliated with Warner Bros. The company's first production was Enter the Dragon, the film that spurred interest in the martial arts genre and which introduced Bruce Lee to the international film market.

His production company Paul Heller Productions produced First Monday in October, starring Walter Matthau and Jill Clayburgh, and the critically acclaimed British film Withnail and I, written and directed by Bruce Robinson. He produced the first made-for-cable feature film, titled Falcon's Gold, and then Showtime's Pygmalion, starring Peter O'Toole and Margot Kidder.

=== Television production ===
Heller first has produced the television movie Wait Until Dark, distributed by Warner Bros. and HBO in 1982. In the same year, he produced Falcon's Gold. In 1998, he was involved in David and Lisa, produced with Oprah's Harpo Productions.

During this time, Heller renewed his interest in teaching promising young students of film. Heller was approached by the American Film Institute to develop a producing program for their new school in Los Angeles, the American Film Institute Center for Advanced Studies. He previously taught at New York University and Columbia University as well as founded the Community Film Workshop Council with the American Film Institute.

This was followed by lectures at conferences and by teaching two master programs at the University of California, Los Angeles. He headed the education and outreach committee of the British Academy of Film and Television Arts in Los Angeles.

=== Philanthropic activities ===
In 1989, Heller founded ASK Theatre, a nonprofit group dedicated to new plays and playwrights, which works together with the Mark Taper Theatre in Los Angeles, The Royal Court Theatre in London and Lincoln Center in New York. He was also a member of the American Academy of Motion Picture Arts and Sciences and served on the board of directors of the British Academy of Film and Television Arts as well as on the board of the Hearst Castle Preservation Foundation. He was a member of the United Scenic Artists, the Directors Guild and the Screen Actors Guild.

In October 2010, Heller made an opening remark for the Koyamada International Foundation's United States Martial Arts Festival with his friend Shin Koyamada at the Redondo Beach Performing Arts Center in Redondo Beach, California. Heller served on the board of directors of the Koyamada Foundation.

=== Multimedia and theatrical ===
Heller was a pioneer in the field of multimedia and theatrical presentations. His productions include The New York Experience, which played for 16 years at Rockefeller Center, and The South Street Venture, an attraction for seven years at the Dockland of New York City. He completed the audiovisual and multimedia exhibits for the Skirball Cultural Center in Los Angeles.

== Filmography (producer) ==
=== Films ===
- David and Lisa (1962)
- Once Upon a Tractor (1965)
- The Eavesdropper (1966)
- The Best of Laurel and Hardy (1967)
- Secret Ceremony (1968)
- Stop (1970)
- Enter the Dragon (1973)
- Black Belt Jones (1974)
- Truck Turner (1974)
- The Ultimate Warrior (1975)
- The Wilby Conspiracy (1975)
- The Barony (1975)
- Dirty Knight's Work (1976)
- Crazy Animals (1976)
- Hot Potato (1976)
- The Pack (1977)
- The Promise (1979)
- First Monday in October (1981)
- Withnail & I (1987)
- My Left Foot: The Story of Christy Brown (1989)
- Fatal Inheritance (1993)
- The Annihilation of Fish (1999)
- Blood and Steel: Making 'Enter the Dragon (2003)

=== Television ===
==== TV movies ====
- Wait Until Dark (1982, producer)
- Falcon's Gold (1982, producer)
- David and Lisa (1998, producer)

== Filmography (actor) ==
- Enter the Dragon (1973) as Radio Operator
- The Annihilation of Fish (1999) as Milkman
