= Oscar Williams (filmmaker) =

Crucian filmmaker and director (?-2023)

- Born: May 20, 1939; St. Croix, U.S. Virgin Islands, U.S.
- Died: January 30, 2023 (aged 83); Qatar
- Occupation: Actor/Director/Writer
- Years active: 1970s–2000s

Oscar S. Williams (May 20, 1939 – January 30, 2023) was a film actor, screenwriter and film director. He was born in the St. Croix, U.S. Virgin Islands and raised in the United States.

Williams died on January 30, 2023, in Qatar, where his son David lives. His oldest son Noel Williams still resides in Los Angeles, California. After his death, a group of speakers paid tribute to Williams at a Red Carpet Memorial Tribute at Caribbean Cinemas in St. Thomas.

== Filmography ==
Actor:

- Fast Break (film) (1979) as Norman
- 3 Chains o' Gold (1994)
- Soul of the Game (1996) as Grays Manager
- Shades of Gray (2005) as Oscar
- Wick (2010) as Orderly 1

Director:

- Death Drug (1978)
- Hot Potato (1976) (also screenwriter)
- Five on the Black Hand Side (1973)
- The Final Comedown (1972) (also screenwriter) (a.k.a. Blast!)

Writer:

- Truck Turner (1974) (a.k.a. Black Bullet)
- Black Belt Jones (1974)
