= Alan Weeks (actor) =

American actor

- Born: March 22, 1948
- Died: October 10, 2015 (aged 67)

Alan Weeks (March 22, 1948 – October 10, 2015) was an American actor, dancer, singer, choreographer, director, and theatre educator. Born and raised in Brooklyn, he began his career as a child actor in the Broadway productions of The Body Beautiful (1958) and The Octoroon (1961). In his late teens he portrayed Five Finger Finney and worked as a dancer in the original cast of Funny Girl starring Barbra Streisand. He worked on more than a dozen Broadway shows as an adult, including roles in the musicals Hallelujah, Baby! (1967), George M! (1968), The Wiz (1976-1977), The Tap Dance Kid (1983-1984), and Big Deal (1985). He directed and choreographed the Tony Award nominated musical The High Rollers Social and Pleasure Club (1992).

Weeks made his film debut in Shaft (1971), and subsequently had roles in The French Connection (1971), Black Belt Jones (1974), Lost in the Stars (1974), Truck Turner (1974), and Brighton Beach Memoirs (1986) among other movies. He also worked as a guest actor in American television, and was a main cast member of the short lived sitcom Baker's Dozen (1982). In his later life he lived in East Nassau, New York and worked as both a director and actor in regional theatre in Albany, New York. He also worked as a drama teacher at several institutions, including Albany High School, Philip Livingston Magnet Academy, and The Sage Colleges. He died in 2015 at the age of 67.

== Early life and work as a child actor ==
The son of George Weeks and his wife Edna Weeks (nee Hunt), Alan Edward Weeks was born on March 22, 1948 in Brooklyn, New York. He began his career as a child actor; making his Broadway debut in Jerry Bock and Sheldon Harnick's musical The Body Beautiful. He portrayed the character of Josh in this show and had a featured part in the songs "Uh-Huh, Oh Yeah!" and "Just My Luck". He returned to Broadway in the 1961 revival of Dion Boucicault's The Octoroon as the slave boy Paul, and was Five Finger Finney and a dancer in the original production of Styne's Funny Girl starring Barbra Streisand. He played the latter role while still in his teens from 1964-1967.

== Broadway career as an adult ==
As a young adult, Weeks performed in another Broadway musical by Styne, Hallelujah, Baby!, performing the parts of Tap, Prover, and a G.I. It ran at the Martin Beck Theatre in 1967-1968. He next portrayed the parts Frankie, Sailor, Buck, and Winger in the original cast of George M! at the Palace Theatre in 1968. In 1969 he portrayed Le Roy in the short lived musical The Fig Leaves Are Falling at the Broadhurst Theatre. This was followed by parts in two other ill fated Broadway musicals: Boscombe in Billy (1969) and Sam in the revue That's Entertainment (1972). In the latter work he performed the duet "Hottentot Potentate", originally written for the show At Home Abroad, with Vivian Reed. He returned to Broadway in another flop, the rock musical Rockabye Hamlet (1976), in which he portrayed the part of Claudius.

Weeks replaced André De Shields in the title role of the Broadway musical The Wiz; portraying the part from May 1976 through January 1977. He created the role of Stan Howard in the Off-Broadway musical A Broadway Musical which was staged in the theatre at Riverside Church in October-November 1978. He was one of the few original cast members who remained with the production when it ran briefly on Broadway in December 1978.

While not in the opening night cast, Weeks spent time performing on a periodic basis in the original production of Ain't Misbehavin' between the years 1978 and 1982. He portrayed Western Habim in the short-lived Broadway musical Oh, Brother! (1981). This was followed by Daddy Bates in The Tap Dance Kid; a hit Broadway musical based on Louise Fitzhugh's novel Nobody's Family is Going to Change which ran from 1983-1985. In 1986 he portrayed the role of Willie in Bob Fosse's final work, the musical Big Deal. Week's final contribution to Broadway was directing and choreographing the 1992 musical revue The High Rollers Social and Pleasure Club at the Helen Hayes Theatre. He re-teamed with Vivian Reed on this show, and Reed was nominated for a Tony Award for her role as the Enchantress in this production.

== Television and film ==
Weeks made his film debut as Gus in the 1971 picture Shaft. That same year he portrayed a drug pusher in The French Connection. He had roles in several blaxploitation films of 1974; including a minor part in Willie Dynamite, Toppy in Black Belt Jones, and Jerry in Truck Turner. His other film roles included Matthew in Lost in the Stars (1974), a film adaptation of the musical by Kurt Weil, and Andrew in Neil Simon's Brighton Beach Memoirs (1986).

On television Weeks was a guest star on the series One Life to Live, The Rookies, Police Woman, Fame, Hull High, and Dallas. He was a main cast member on the short lived sitcom Baker's Dozen (1982); portraying the part of Otis Kelly. In 1983 he portrayed Tweedledee in the television adaptation of Eva Le Gallienne and Florida Friebus's stage version of Alice in Wonderland which aired on PBS's Great Performances.

== Other work and later life ==
Weeks moved to East Nassau, New York in 1985 and lived there for the rest of his life while working professionally in theatre in Albany, New York. He worked on the staff of the performing arts venue The Egg, Albany (EA) as the director of the EA's Student Theatre Outreach Program. He also performed regularly at both the EA and the Capital Repertory Theatre (CRT). He also directed several productions at the CRT. In 2005 he became a drama teacher at Albany High School, and he also taught theatre at The Sage Colleges and the Philip Livingston Magnet Academy.

Weeks had four children with his wife Sara. He died in East Nassau, New York on October 10, 2015 at the age of 67.
