= Philip Michael Thomas =

American actor (born 1949)

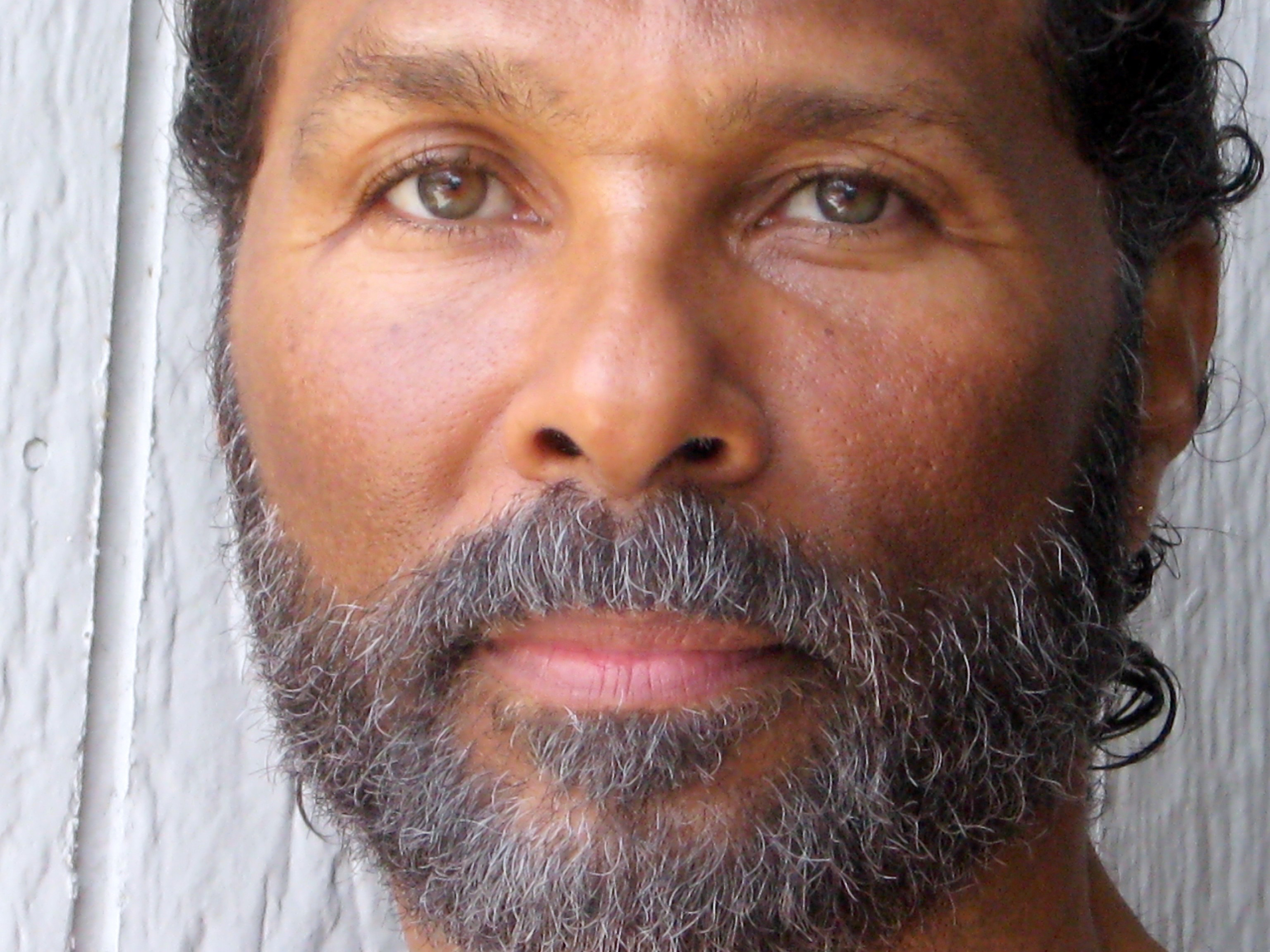
- Born: May 26, 1949 (age 77); Columbus, Ohio, U.S.
- Education: University of California, Riverside
- Occupations: Actor, musician
- Years active: 1972–2006
- Spouse: Kassandra Thomas

Philip Michael Thomas (born May 26, 1949) is an American retired actor, musician and composer best known for his role as detective Ricardo Tubbs on the hit 1980s TV series Miami Vice. His first notable roles were in Coonskin (1975) and opposite Irene Cara in the 1976 film Sparkle. After his success in Miami Vice, he appeared in numerous made-for-TV movies and advertisements for telephone psychic services. He also voiced the character Lance Vance in the video games Grand Theft Auto: Vice City (2002) and Grand Theft Auto: Vice City Stories (2006).

== Early life ==
Thomas was born in Columbus, Ohio, and grew up in San Bernardino, California. He is of African American, Native American, Irish, and German descent. His father, Louis Diggs, was a foreman at a Westinghouse plant. Thomas's mother was Lulu McMorris. He and his seven half brothers and sisters had the surname Thomas, which was the last name of his mother's first husband. His siblings are Marcus, Michelle, Karen, Anita, Carol, Crystal and George.

As a child, he acted in his church's theater group and, at age 15, while participating in the Pentecostal Delman Heights Four Square Gospel Church choir, he became interested in ministry. He graduated from San Bernardino High School in 1967 and briefly worked as a janitor to save money for college. He earned a scholarship to the historically Black Oakwood College in Huntsville, Alabama, where he studied religion and philosophy.

After two years at Oakwood College, Thomas transferred to the University of California, Riverside. During that time, he auditioned for and was cast in the San Francisco production of Hair, beginning his acting career. He quit college to pursue acting as a profession, appearing in several features during the 1970s, including the classic musical drama Sparkle (1976). His big break came in 1984, when he landed a starring role in the popular television series Miami Vice alongside Don Johnson.

== Career ==
=== Acting ===
==== Miami Vice ====
In 1984, Thomas began playing the role of Ricardo Tubbs, an ex-NYPD officer from the Bronx who came to Miami seeking revenge for the death of his brother, Rafael Tubbs. In Miami he encounters another undercover cop, Sonny Crockett, who is coincidentally also looking for Rafael's killer. Thomas was reportedly paid $25,000 (equivalent to $77,000 today) per episode for Seasons 1–2. In 1986, he was given an increase to $50,000 ($155,000) per episode for Seasons 3–5. Johnson was paid $30,000 ($93,000) per episode for Seasons 1–2, and $90,000 ($279,000) per episode for Seasons 3–5.

Thomas coined the acronym "EGOT" (meaning "Emmy, Grammy, Oscar, and Tony"), in reference to his plans for winning all four awards. He has not, as of November 2026, been nominated for any of these awards, but has received a People's Choice Award and a Golden Globe Award nomination.

==== Extralarge & We Are Angels ====
Thomas starred in the six-part television miniseries Extralarge with Bud Spencer in 1991. Thomas was replaced by Michael Winslow for the second series. Thomas and Spencer were later cast together again in the miniseries We Are Angels, released in 1997.

==== Nash Bridges ====
In 1997, Thomas was reunited with Don Johnson for two appearances in the police drama Nash Bridges. He played Cedrick "Rick" Hawks, a Deputy United States Marshal from Miami visiting Nash Bridges (Johnson) in San Francisco. His first appearance was in the second-season episode "Wild Card", and his second and final appearance was in the episode "Out of Miami", which aired in 2001 during the program's final season.

==== Grand Theft Auto: Vice City ====
In 2002, Thomas did voice-over work for the video game Grand Theft Auto: Vice City; he portrayed Lance Vance, a supporting character who aids the game's protagonist, Tommy Vercetti, in several story missions while trying to avenge the death of his brother, Victor Vance. Thomas reprised the role in the 2006 prequel Grand Theft Auto: Vice City Stories, which details Lance's arrival in Vice City, the beginning of his involvement in the drug trade, and his relationship with Victor.

=== Music ===
In 1985, Thomas released a music album titled Living the Book of My Life under his own record label called Spaceship Records. It sold poorly and failed to produce a hit single, although Thomas produced a video for the track "Just the Way I Planned It"; the song reached #75 on the Billboard R&B chart. He performed the title song of the album during the 1985 Miami Vice episode "The Maze". The 1986 episode "Trust Fund Pirates" featured another song of his, "La Mirada". His Miami Vice co-star Don Johnson recorded an album shortly afterward, titled Heartbeat. In 1987, Thomas recorded a song called "Ever and Forever" with Argentine singer Lucía Galán of Pimpinela fame.

Thomas released a second album, Somebody, in 1988. It also failed to produce a hit and sold poorly, though its single "Don't Make Promises" did best the prior single, reaching #56 on the Billboard R&B chart. In 1993, Thomas teamed with Kathy Rahill to compose "My, My, My, Miam...I", which was chosen to be the city of Miami's theme song. That same year, Thomas and Jamaican fitness instructor Sandi Morais composed songs for Sacha, a family-friendly musical that enjoyed runs in south Florida and New York. The two formed the Magic Cookie Production Company. Thomas produced the music for Morais' fitness videos in 2001 and 2006.

=== Psychic Reader's Network ===
In 1994, Thomas signed an agreement with Psychic Reader's Network (later known as Traffix, Inc.) based in Melbourne, Florida, becoming the spokesman for the Philip Michael Thomas International Psychic Network. He appeared in television ads and claimed to have met the planet's premier psychics through his "world travels". He dressed similarly to his Miami Vice alter ego, even opening the ads with the phrase, "From Miami Vice to world advice!" He appeared in informercials with Eileen Brennan and Todd McKee along with his daughter, Sacha Nicole, promoting the psychic line. Thomas released a cassette of music linked to his psychic business titled PMT Psychic Connection, Volume I.

Traffix replaced Thomas with Miss Cleo. He sued, alleging breach of contract, and won. In 2002, a New York arbitrator awarded Thomas $1.48 million for the improper use of his name and likeness and an additional $780,000 in interest.

== Personal life ==
Thomas is a vegetarian, non-smoker, and non-drinker, all of which were also incorporated into his Miami Vice character. In 1986, he was sued for child support by Dhaima Matthews, the mother of his then two-year-old daughter and nine-week-old son. Thomas later married model Kassandra Green. Green filed a domestic violence complaint against Thomas in 1997, during which time she was described as being the mother of five of his 12 children. Thomas dismissed the complaint as "an absolute, blatant lie".

== Filmography ==
=== Film ===
Year	Title	Role	Notes
1972	Come Back, Charleston Blue	Minister	
1972	Stigma	Dr. Calvin Crosse	
1973	Book of Numbers	Dave Green	
1975	Mr. Ricco	Purvis Mapes	
1975	Black Fist	Fletch / Boom Boom	
1975	Coonskin	Randy / Brother Rabbit	Voice of Brother Rabbit
1976	Sparkle	Stix	
1976	El hombre de los hongos	Gaspar / Adopted boy	
1978	Death Drug	Jesse	
1979	The Dark	Corn Rows	
1982	Hey Good Lookin'	Boogaloo Jones / Chaplin	Voice
1982	Stigma		
1988	The Wizard of Speed and Time	Policeman Mickey Polanko	Feature-length version
1993	Miami Shakedown	Frank Ferguson	Also executive producer
1994	River of Stone		
2003	Fate	Detective Ciprian Raines	

=== Television ===
Year	Title	Role	Notes
1973	Griff	Eddie Marshall	Episode: "The Framing of Billy the Kid"
1973–1974	Toma	Bad Sam / Sam Hooper	2 episodes
1974	Good Times	Eddie Conroy	Episode: "Sex and the Evans Family"
1974	Police Woman	Sonny	Episode: "It's Only a Game"
1975	Caribe	Prince John	Episode: "Murder in Paradise"
1976	Movin' On	Banjo	Episode: "No More Sad Songs"
1976	Medical Center	Dr. Sam Karter	Episode: "If Wishes Were Horses"
1976	Sirota's Court	J.V.	Episode: "The Reporter"
1977	Insight	Luther	Episode: "The Alleluia Kid"
1977	Roosevelt and Truman	Truman	Television pilot
1978	The New Adventures of Wonder Woman	Furst	Episode: "The Man Who Wouldn't Tell"
1978	Starsky & Hutch	Kingston St. Jacques	Episode: "Quadromania"
1978	The Beasts Are on the Streets	Eddie Morgan	Television film
1978	Lawman Without a Gun	Rufus Cartwright	Television film
1979	Roots: The Next Generations	Eddie Franklin	Television miniseries
1979	Valentine	Bean	Television film
1981	Strike Force	Wesley	Episode: "The Victims"
1982	Trapper John, M.D.	Floyd Walsh	Episode: "Ladies in Waiting"
1984–1989	Miami Vice	Detective Ricardo Tubbs	111 episodes
1986	A Fight for Jenny	David Caldwell	Television film
1989	False Witness	Bobby Marsh	Television film
1990	Superboy	Brimstone	Episode: "Brimstone"
1990	Zorro	Jack Holten	Episode: "Pride of the Pueblo"
1990	A Little Piece of Sunshine	Tomson	Television film
1991	Perry Mason: The Case of the Ruthless Reporter	Chuck Gilmore	Television film
1991–1992	Detective Extralarge	Jean Philippe Dumas	6 episodes
1992	Swamp Thing	Barry Scott	Episode: "Dead and Married"
1994	Fortune Hunter	Gary Colt	Episode: "The Alpha Team"
1997	Noi siamo angeli (We Are Angels)	Joe / Father Zaccaria	6 episodes
1997–2001	Nash Bridges	Cedrick Hawks	2 episodes

=== Video games ===
Year	Title	Role	Notes
1997	We Are Angels	Father Zaccaria	
2002	Grand Theft Auto: Vice City	Lance Vance	
2006	Grand Theft Auto: Vice City Stories	Lance Vance	
2021	Grand Theft Auto: The Trilogy – The Definitive Edition	Lance Vance	Archival recordings Remaster of Grand Theft Auto: Vice City only.

== Discography ==
- Living the Book of My Life (1985)
- Somebody (1988)

== See also ==
- EGOT – The acronym "EGOT" was coined by Philip Michael Thomas.
