= Truck Turner =

1974 film by Jonathan Kaplan

- Theatrical release poster
- Directed by: Jonathan Kaplan
- Screenplay by: Michael Allin; Oscar Williams
- Story by: Jerry Wilkes
- Produced by: Fred Weintraub; Paul Heller
- Starring: Isaac Hayes; Yaphet Kotto; Alan Weeks; Annazette Chase; Nichelle Nichols
- Music by: Isaac Hayes
- Production company: Sequoia Pictures
- Distributed by: American International Pictures
- Release date: June 26, 1974
- Running time: 91 minutes
- Country: United States
- Language: English
- Box office: $2.23 million

Truck Turner, also known as Black Bullet, is a 1974 American blaxploitation film, starring Isaac Hayes and Yaphet Kotto, and directed by Jonathan Kaplan. The screenplay was written by Michael Allin, Leigh Chapman (under a pseudonym, Jerry Wilkes), and Oscar Williams. Hayes also scored the music for the soundtrack. The film was released by American International Pictures as a double feature with Foxy Brown.

== Plot ==
Mack "Truck" Turner (Hayes) is a former professional football player who becomes a Los Angeles–based bounty hunter after an injury. Truck visits his girlfriend, Annie (Annazette Chase), who is in jail and wants to leave LA when released. Truck and his partner Jerry Barnes go to collect their bounty from Nate Dinwiddie, a bail bondsman, who refers them to Fogarty (Dick Miller), a bail bondsman after a pimp who skipped bail named Gator.

The two visit Dorinda (Nichelle Nichols), a Madam who runs Gator's stable of prostitutes. Truck and Jerry wait for Gator to visit, and chase him, but Gator escapes. A tip from Truck's friend Duke (Scatman Crothers) allows them to locate Gator again, and kill Gator when he attempts to shoot Truck.

Dorinda threatens Gator's former whores to keep them in line. Dorinda offers Gator's competing pimps a deal: whoever kills Truck gets to replace Gator while she runs the stable. The only pimp interested in the violence is Harvard Blue (Kotto). Truck survives several ambushes by Blue's goons.

When Blue points out that Dorinda will not be able to deal with Truck, they agree to share the cost of getting rid of Truck, and Blue will take over more control of Gator's stable. Blue's men force Nate to call Truck and tell him that there is a big job. Truck does not feel sober enough after a night of partying, so he calls Jerry, who dies in Blue's ambush.

Nate warns Truck of the hit out on him. Truck frames Annie for shoplifting, and the police arrest her. Truck visits Nate again in the hospital. Truck gives Nate Jerry's gun for protection, and then they shoot Blue's goons when they burst in. Blue flees, but Truck shoots him. Blue dies a few minutes later in the driver's seat of his car. Truck confronts Dorinda and more goons at her house, and kills her when she reaches for a gun.

Truck makes up with Annie as she gets out of jail. All of his belongings are packed in the car, and he promises he will go away with her, right away, if she takes him back. They drive off together, leaving LA for good.

== Cast ==
- Isaac Hayes as Mack "Truck" Turner
- Yaphet Kotto as "Harvard Blue"
- Alan Weeks as Jerry Barnes
- Annazette Chase as Annie
- Nichelle Nichols as Dorinda
- Sam Laws as Nate Dinwiddie
- Paul Harris as Richard Leroy "Gator" Johnson
- Charles Cyphers as Drunk
- John Kramer as Desmond
- Scatman Crothers as Duke
- Dick Miller as Fogarty
- Bob Harris as "Snow"
- Jac Emil as Reno
- Edna Richardson as "Frenchie"
- Stan Shaw as Fontana
- Wendell Tucker as Wendell
- Earl Maynard as "Panama"
- Tara Strohmeier as "Turnpike"
- Henry Kingi as "Candy Man"
- Esther Sutherland as "Black Momma"

== Production ==
The film started as a script by Leigh Chapman about a caucasian bounty hunter. It was bought by Fred Weintraub who was in partnership with Larry Gordon. Chapman later recalled, "I remember going into the office and, with my usual insouciance? arrogance? announced that, in that case, I wasn’t going to do any freebie re-writes. The response? That’s OK. He doesn’t want you on the project anyway.... And then, it became a blaxploitation film … about pimps and whores, right? I don’t think any of that was in my script and I’m not sure why I even received a story credit. I used Jerry Wilkes [as a pseudonym. That’s part of my ex-husband’s name."

Kaplan says the film was written for Lee Marvin, Robert Mitchum, or Ernest Borgnine. "Larry Gordon at AIP said, 'Well, we can't get any of them so now it's a black picture.' Isaac Hayes was cast and that's how that came about."

== Reception ==
Truck Turner received a mixed to positive critical reception. The film holds a 60% rating on Rotten Tomatoes based on five reviews.

The Los Angeles Times called it "an extraordinary visual experience... as successfully surreal as Point Blank."

== Home media ==
- In 2001 it was released on DVD.
- In 2010, it was digitized in High Definition (1080i) and broadcast on MGM HD.
- On July 7, 2015, Truck Turner was released on Blu-ray.

== Attempted remake ==
In 2004, Metro-Goldwyn-Mayer and Queen Latifah's production company, Flavor Unit Entertainment, attempted to remake the film, which was to have been written by Chris Frisina.

== Soundtrack ==
Truck Turner

Soundtrack album by Isaac Hayes
- Released: July 8, 1974
- Recorded: 1974
- Genre: Funk
- Length: 72:01
- Label: Enterprise; ENS-2-5702
- Producer: Isaac Hayes

Isaac Hayes chronology
Tough Guys (1974)	Truck Turner (1974)	Chocolate Chip (1975)

Professional ratings
Review scores
Source	Rating
AllMusic	3/5 stars

The soundtrack of Truck Turner was composed by Isaac Hayes and was originally released as a double record album on vinyl. In 1993, it was released in a double-CD album alongside Hayes' other lesser-known soundtrack of the movie Three Tough Guys and again released on its own CD in 2002. Some of the music score was used by filmmaker Quentin Tarantino in the Kill Bill series.

Track listing:

1. "Main Title (Truck Turner)"
2. "House of Beauty"
3. "Blue's Crib"
4. "Driving in the Sun"
5. "Breakthrough"
6. "Now We're One"
7. "The Duke"
8. "Dorinda's Party"
9. "Pursuit of the Pimpmobile"
10. "We Need Each Other Girl"
11. "A House Full of Girls"
12. "Hospital Shootout"
13. "You're in My Arms Again"
14. "Give It to Me"
15. "Drinking"
16. "The Insurance Company"
17. "End Theme"

== See also ==
- List of American films of 1974
- List of blaxploitation films
