= Hot Potato (1976 film) =

1976 film by Oscar Williams

- Theatrical release poster
- Directed by: Oscar Williams
- Written by: Oscar Williams
- Produced by: Fred Weintraub; Paul Heller
- Starring: Jim Kelly
- Cinematography: Ronald Garcia
- Edited by: Peter E. Berger
- Production company: Sequoia Pictures
- Distributed by: Warner Bros.
- Release date: April 7, 1976 (Pittsburgh)
- Running time: 87 minutes
- Country: United States
- Language: English

Hot Potato (also known as Twist the Tiger's Tail) is a 1976 American action film written and directed by Oscar Williams. The film was a Fred Weintraub and Paul Heller production starring Jim Kelly, who also arranged his own fight scenes. Hot Potato was filmed on location in Chiang Mai, Thailand. It is a follow-up to Black Belt Jones. The film was distributed by Warner Bros. Pictures.

This film came along toward the end of one genre in film and helped mark the beginning of a new genre. It provides a bridge from what is commonly known as blaxploitation film to the kung fu genre made popular by Bruce Lee. Hot Potato and films like it entertained the same audience as the popular black films of the early seventies such as Super Fly, Shaft, and Black Caesar which were opposed by the activist organizations NAACP (National Association for the Advancement of Colored People) and CORE (Congress of Racial Equality). However, such films also provided an international audience. This phenomenon meant the same amount of money could be invested to make a film with less political hassle and more profits.

== Plot ==
Hot Potato begins in Chang Lan, a fictional country somewhere in east Asia. The villain Carter Rangoon (Sam Hiona) orchestrated the kidnapping of a U.S. senator's daughter a Ms. June Dunbar (Judith Brown). Rangoon's demands were to see aid to Chang Lan or Ms. Dunbar would be executed. The U.S. was in a difficult situation. They were not welcome in that area of the world and had little influence in the region. They sent in whom the general (Ron Prince) described as their best man, Black Belt Jones (Jim Kelly).

Jones assembled a small force of mercenaries to assist in the task at hand. Johnny Chicago (Geoffrey Binney), whose primary motivation in life was money, was the first the mercenaries introduced in the film. The duo of Jones and Chicago were joined by Pamala (Irene Tsu), a Chang Lan operative who was to act as the group's interpreter and guide. She quickly proved her usefulness as a skilled fighter as she took on several goons refusing assistance from Jones and Chicago. Finally the group joins up with Rhino (George Memmoli) at a brothel. Rhino is a grotesque Italian from Texas with a passion for women and food.

Rangoon's scheme was more diabolical than kidnapping and extortion. He also arranged for a prostitute named Leslie (also played by Judith Brown) to pose as the senator's daughter for the rescue party to free her. Leslie was concerned for her safety if she were discovered. So, to insure her safety she stole some letters from Rangoon's office. If the material in the letters were to get out it could spell the end of Rangoon.

Jones and his team invade Rangoon's jungle fortress, symbolic of Hannibal on the backs of elephants.

After the rescue Rangoon discovers his letters are missing and dispatches his minions to follow them through the jungle.

As the group make their way through the jungle they engage several groups of henchmen, all of whom fail. The plot begins to thicken as well. Romantic involvement begins to form as Chicago falls in love with Leslie. The group is also joined by a native woman and her son whom Rhino won in a wrestling match.

Jones becomes suspicious of the impostor and at the opportune moment went looking in the purse she seemed to cherish more than life itself. He found the letters. The group attacked and Leslie was taken. Jones proposed a trade: the letters for the girl. Things did not go as planned and Leslie was killed.

Jones then plans a covert attack on Rangoon's primary estate ending in a one-on-one fight scene between Rangoon and Jones as the senator's daughter hung over a pit of tigers.

== Cast ==
- Jim Kelly as Jones
- George Memmoli as "Rhino"
- Geoffrey Binney as "Chicago"
- Irene Tsu as Pam
- Judith Brown as Leslie / June Dunbar
- Sam Hiona as Rangoon
- Ron Prince as General
- Hardy Stockmann as Krugman
- Metta Rungrat as Rhino's Lady
- Supakorn Songssermvorakul as Boy
- Somchai Meekunsut as Pujo
- Veerapol Pitavan as Longkat
- Puchong Makaraj as Hoss
- Yuen Biao as Supporting Role

== Reception ==
The movie was critically panned.

In its first 10 days of national release in 286 theaters in the United States it grossed $2,422,000.
