= Claudio Guzmán =

Chilean-American director (1927–2008)

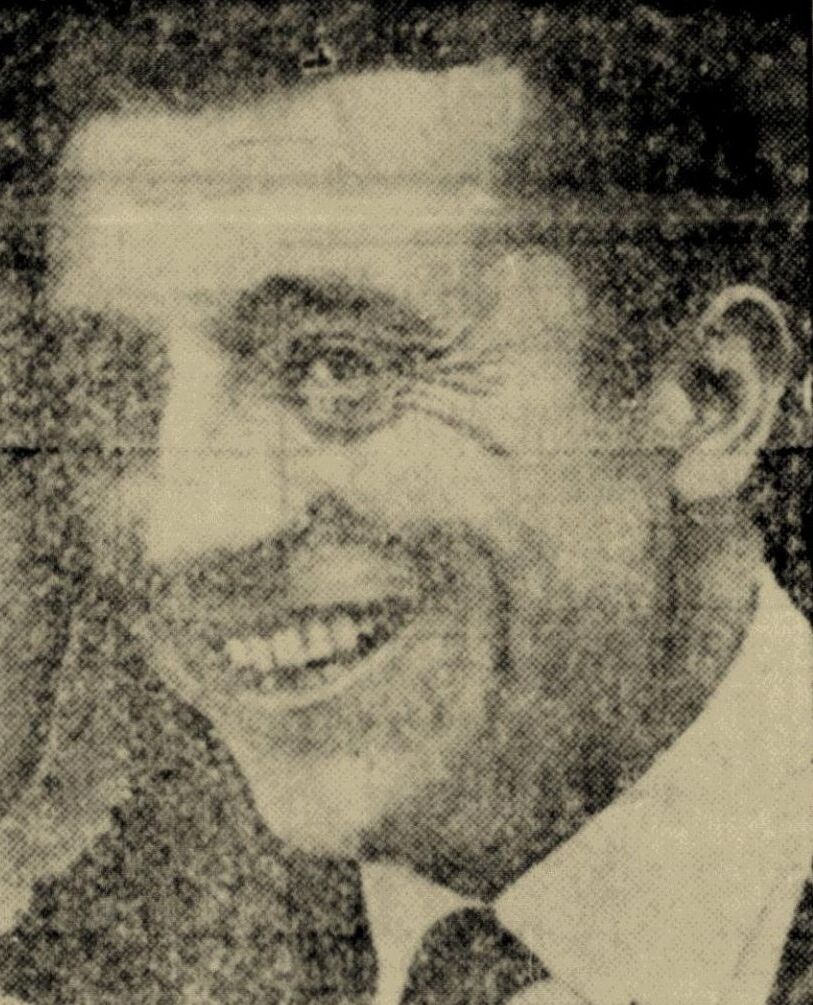
- Claudio Guzmán, in 1964
- Born: Claudio Elias Guzmán; August 2, 1927; Rancagua, O’Higgins Province, Chile
- Died: July 12, 2008 (aged 80); Los Angeles, California, U.S.
- Occupations: television director, producer, art director, and production designer
- Years active: 1947–1991
- Spouses: Audrey Bashore (m. 1954; div. 1959) Anna Maria Alberghetti (m. 1964; div. 1974) Micki Gardiner (m. 1981)
- Children: 2

Claudio Guzmán (August 2, 1927 – July 12, 2008) was a Chilean-American television director, producer, art director, and production designer.

== Biography ==
Guzmán was born in Rancagua, Chile, in 1927. As a young man, he enrolled at the University of Chile to study architecture, following in the footsteps of his architect father. In 1947, Guzmán had been appointed set designer for the Chilean National Ballet, the youngest ever up to that date.

Sources conflict as to when Guzmán emigrated to the United States. One of Guzmán's first jobs was working with director Vladimir Rosing on The California Story, the state's mammoth centennial production at the Hollywood Bowl in 1950. Guzmán would work again with Rosing on the Oregon state centennial production in 1959.

By 1952 he had begun to establish himself as a set designer in Southern California. Guzmán had also enrolled at the University of Southern California in order to continue his architectural studies. His lack of fluency in English deterred him from continuing, choosing instead to work at an assembly line in Anaheim. Guzmán later quit that job in order to study design, eventually being hired by Paramount Studios, where he became an art director. It was there that Guzmán met Desi Arnaz, who brought him to work at Desilu, where he remained for eight years. During this period, Guzmán continued working in the theatre and performed on a comedy sketch with Red Skelton on his long-running television show.

Guzmán began his career at Desilu by heading the art direction on Where's Raymond?, later renamed The Ray Bolger Show. In 1958, he directed the Westinghouse Desilu Playhouse episode "Bernadette", a dramatic adaptation of the life of Saint Bernadette of Lourdes starring Pier Angeli. According to Angeli, Guzmán shot the episode in chronological order "so the cast—just like the viewers—could feel the impact of Bernadette's discovery of the stream pointed out to her by the Blessed Mother." The program earned Guzmán an Emmy Award in the "Best Art Direction in a Television Film" category. Guzmán also directed Border Justice, starring Gilbert Roland, and The Desilu Revue, which consisted of vignettes performed by Desilu's stars for the Westinghouse Desilu Playhouse.

Other Desilu programs that Guzmán produced and directed for were I Love Lucy, The Untouchables, and December Bride. Guzmán was also color consultant and interior decorator for Arnaz's Western Hills Hotel at Indian Wells.

In addition to I Dream of Jeannie, Guzmán directed such programs as Nancy, The Dick Van Dyke Show, The Good Life, The Fugitive, The Patty Duke Show, The Flying Nun, The Partridge Family, and Harper Valley PTA. He was also an executive producer on the series Villa Alegre, for which he received two Daytime Emmy Award nominations. His rare film directing credits included the 1975 comedy Linda Lovelace for President, starring porn film actress Linda Lovelace.

== Personal life ==
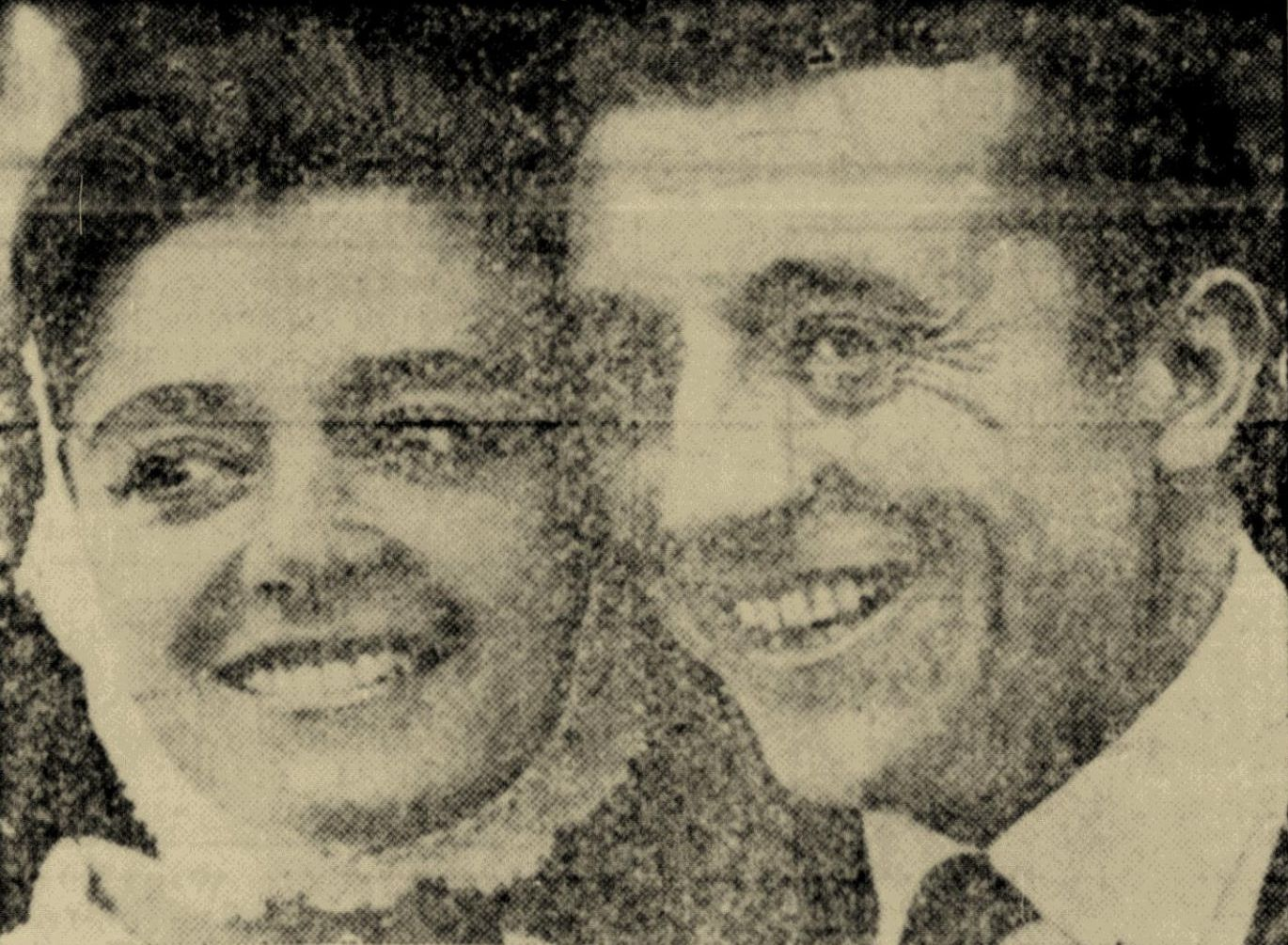
Anna Maria Alberghetti and Claudio Guzmán on their wedding day

In 1954, Guzmán married Audrey Bashore, a graduate of Duke University. They divorced in 1959.

His second wife was Anna Maria Alberghetti, whom he married on September 12, 1964 at Saint Victor Catholic Church in West Hollywood. Their wedding reception was hosted by Pierre Cossette in Brentwood. Guzmán and Alberghetti had two children together before divorcing in 1974. Their Benedict Canyon home was sold to Liza Minnelli and Desi Arnaz Jr.

Prior to the finalization of Guzmán's divorce from Alberghetti, he had developed a relationship with Micki Gardiner. According to his obituary, Guzmán married Gardiner in 1981; she was referred to as his wife as early as 1977 in the press. The couple subsequently lived in Chile until 1987 and remained together until Guzmán's death from pneumonia in 2008.

== Filmography ==
- Antonio (1973)
- Linda Lovelace for President (1975)
- Willa (1979)
- The Hostage Tower (1980)
- For Lovers Only (1982)
