= Living the Book of My Life =

Studio album by Philip Michael Thomas
- Released: 1985
- Genre: R&B; pop; reggae
- Length: 43:06
- Label: Spaceship, Atlantic

Philip Michael Thomas chronology
Living the Book of My Life (1985)	Somebody (1988)

Living the Book of My Life is the debut album of actor Philip Michael Thomas, released in 1985. Written and produced by Thomas himself, the album was one stage of his intention to win the "EGOT" combination of Emmy, Grammy, Oscar and Tony Awards. Despite his ambitions, and the involvement of several noted reggae session musicians, the album has been described as a "bomb", and has received negative reviews from music critics both upon release and in retrospect.

== Production ==
Philip Michael Thomas began working Living the Book of My Life while acting on the television series Miami Vice; he wrote and produced the record as part of his stated goal to become an "EGOT" winner. Thomas had coined this acronym to describe his ambitions to win Emmy, Grammy, Oscar and Tony Awards in his career. Although primarily an actor, Thomas had previous musical experience, having starred in the 1976 musical Sparkle.

Interviewed about the release of Living the Book of My Life in late 1985, Thomas likened it to a Christmas gift, stating: "you know what the ad will be for the LP? 'Take me home and turn me on—Philip Michael Thomas for Christmas'. I'm Santa Claus this year [...] I am Christmas". Working with Thomas on the album were a number of established reggae studio musicians, including percussionist Uziah Thompson, saxophonist Dean Fraser, and guitar player Geoffrey Chung; backing vocals were also provided by Betty Wright.

== Reception ==
Living the Book of My Life has largely been met with negative reviews. A contemporary review by Anita Sarko for Spin magazine was critical of the album's writing and of Thomas' voice. Sarko compared elements of the record unfavorably to Boz Scaggs and The Last Poets, and described Thomas' singing as "so weak, so lifeless". Rolling Stone's Kurt Loder, writing in 1986, wrote that the album was "a humongous bomb", and described it as "a tepid gruel of treacly reggae, the lyrics a mind-puckering jambalaya of self-enthused psychobabble". Loder noted that Thomas was known for his charisma but that it did not translate into his music.

Writing for Entertainment Weekly in 1996, Rich Brown included it on a list of "failed albums" by actors, singling out the song "Fish and Chips" as a low point. Brown noted that as Thomas produced and wrote the album, "at least we know whom to blame". A similar retrospective of actors' albums by Spin in 2007 described it as a "thin drip of New Agey pop/R&B drivel", noting that it "quickly dried up" compared to the later release of an album by Thomas' Miami Vice co-star Don Johnson. A 2014 retrospective look at the album by Desmond Alfonso for Large-Up magazine described the record as "the definition of 'unwarranted vanity project'"; Alfonso singled out the song "Just the Way I Planned It" for its "catchy yet preposterous R&B groove".

== Track listing ==
No.	Title	Length
1.	"Livin' the Book of My Life"	3:45
2.	"Just the Way I Planned It"	4:31
3.	"You Might Be the Lucky One"	3:55
4.	"Fish and Chips"	4:25
5.	"Everything Happens in Its Own Time"	4:50
6.	"She's a Liar"	4:36
7.	"I'm in Love With the Love That You Give to Me"	4:30
8.	"Stay (In My Loving Arms Tonight)"	3:30
9.	"All My Love"	3:27
10.	"La Mirade"	5:37
Total length:		43:06

== Personnel ==
Credits adapted from AllMusic:

- Philip Michael Thomas – Vocals
- Wayne Armond – Guitar
- Derrick Barnett – Bass guitar
- Geoffrey Chung – Guitar, bass guitar, keyboards
- Tim Devine – Keyboards
- Paul Fakhourie – Bass guitar
- Dean Fraser – Saxophone
- Benny Latimore – Piano
- Willie Lindo – Guitar
- Robert Lyn – Keyboards
- Mikey "Boo" Richards – Drums
- Nat Seidman – Electric drums
- Uziah "Sticky" Thompson – Percussion
- Franklyn Waul – Keyboards
