= Scatman Crothers =

American entertainer (1910–1986)

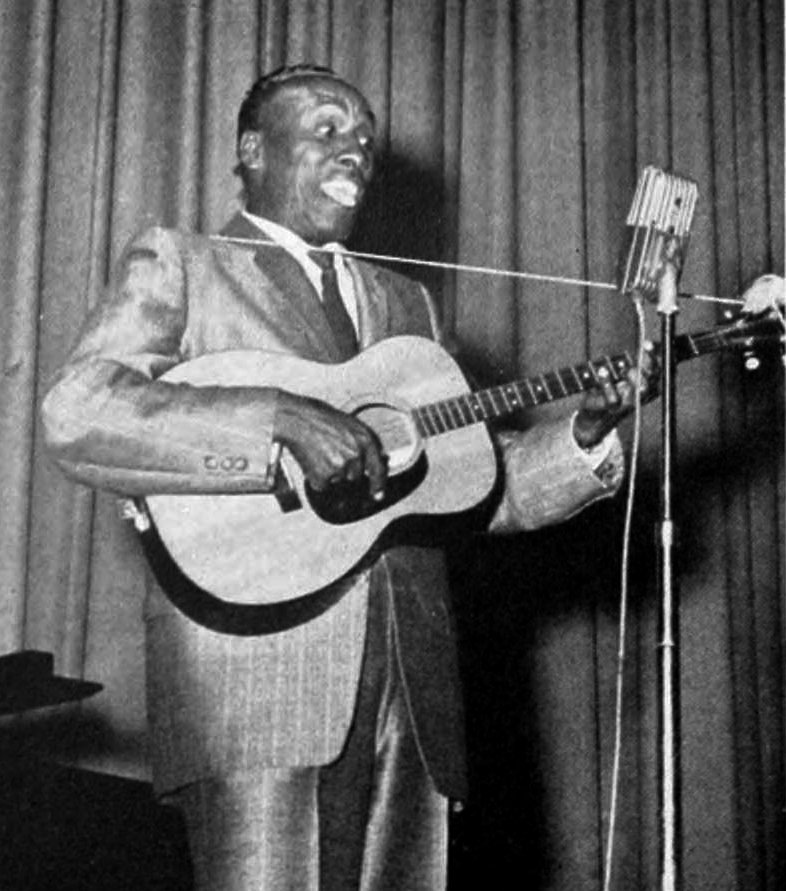
- Crothers in 1960
- Born: Benjamin Sherman Crothers; May 23, 1910; Terre Haute, Indiana, U.S.
- Died: November 22, 1986 (aged 76); Los Angeles, California, U.S.
- Resting place: Forest Lawn Memorial Park - Hollywood Hills, California
- Occupations: Actor; musician
- Years active: 1923–1986
- Spouse: Helen Sullivan (m. 1937–1986)
- Children: 1
- Awards: Saturn Award; Hollywood Walk of Fame

Benjamin Sherman "Scatman" Crothers (May 23, 1910 – November 22, 1986) was an American actor and musician. He is known for playing Louie the Garbage Man on the TV show Chico and the Man, and Dick Hallorann in Stanley Kubrick's The Shining (1980). He was also a prolific voice actor who provided the voices of Meadowlark Lemon in the Harlem Globetrotters animated TV series, Jazz the Autobot in The Transformers and The Transformers: The Movie (1986), the title character in Hong Kong Phooey, and Scat Cat in the Disney animated film The Aristocats (1970).

== Early life ==
Crothers was born and raised in Terre Haute, Indiana.

== Career ==
=== Music ===
Crothers began his musical career at age 13. He sang and was self-educated on guitar and drums. He was in a band that played in speakeasies in Terre Haute, Indiana. During the 1930s, Crothers formed a band, spending eight years living in Akron, Ohio, and performing five days a week on a radio show in Dayton, Ohio. The station manager thought he needed a catchier name, so Crothers suggested "Scatman" for his scat singing. He married Helen Sullivan, a native of Steubenville, Ohio, in 1937. In the 1940s, the couple moved to California.

He performed in Los Angeles and Las Vegas, and at the Apollo Theater in Harlem, New York City. Capitol released several of his singles, including "I'd Rather Be a Hummingbird", "Blue-Eyed Sally", and "Television Blues". High Fidelity Records released his album Rock and Roll with Scatman Crothers. He went on USO tours with Bob Hope. Crothers also performed with bandleader Slim Gaillard. According to the jacket notes of the Let Freedom Sing CD set, Crothers was part of the music group The Ramparts, who sang "The Death of Emmett Till" (1955), a song by A. C. Bilbrew.

=== Film and television ===
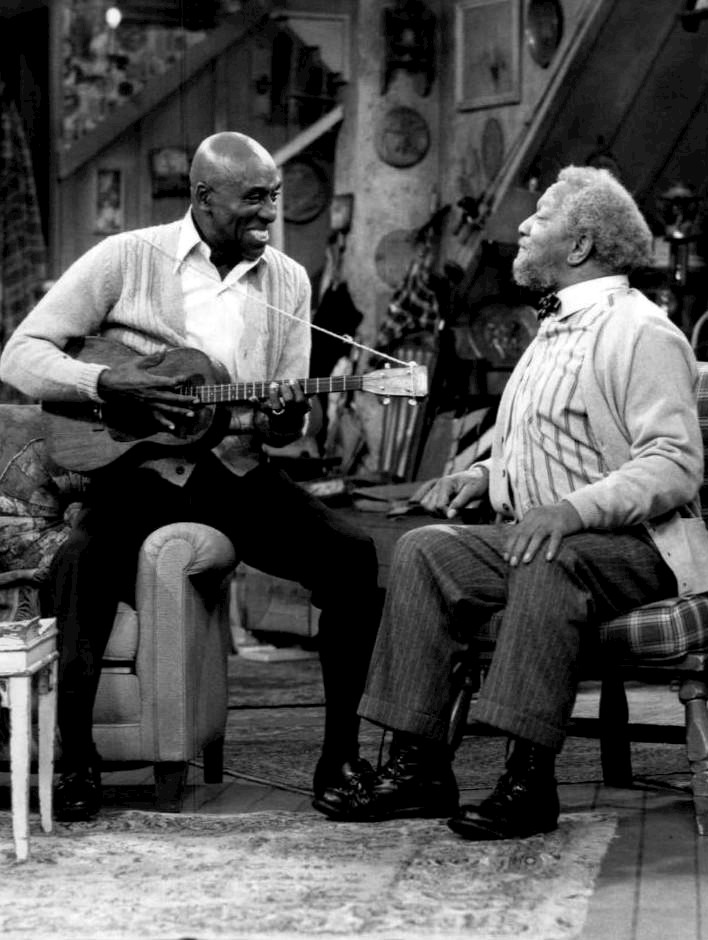
Crothers appearing with Redd Foxx on Sanford and Son

Crothers made his film debut in the movie Meet Me at the Fair (1953). He had roles in the film musical Hello Dolly! (1969) and The Great White Hope (1970) before providing the voice of Scat Cat in the animated film The Aristocats (1970). Crothers appeared in four films with Jack Nicholson: The King of Marvin Gardens (1972), The Fortune (1975), One Flew Over the Cuckoo's Nest (1975), and The Shining (1980). He had the part of a fable-telling convict in the animated film Coonskin (1975), a train porter in Silver Streak (1976), a liveryman in The Shootist (1976), Mingo in Roots (1977), Tinker the piano player in Neil Simon's The Cheap Detective (1978), a ringmaster in Bronco Billy (1980), a baseball coach in Zapped! (1982), and angels in Two of a Kind (1983) and Twilight Zone: The Movie (1983).

Crothers became the first black person to appear regularly in a Los Angeles television show when he joined Dixie Showboat. After portraying Scat Cat in The Aristocats in the 1970s, Crothers found voice acting jobs as Meadowlark Lemon in the Harlem Globetrotters cartoon series and as the title character in Hong Kong Phooey. For four years, he played the role of Louie the garbage man on Chico and the Man. During his appearance on Sanford and Son Crothers joined Redd Foxx for two musical numbers. One was a version of the standard "All of Me", in which he accompanied Foxx on tenor guitar. In 1966, Hanna-Barbera aired an animated special called The New Alice in Wonderland (or What's a Nice Kid like You Doing in a Place like This?), an updated version of the Lewis Carroll story featuring Sammy Davis Jr. as the Cheshire Cat. The special was followed by an audio adaptation for HB Records, but since Davis was signed to Reprise Records, Crothers provided the cat's voice for the album.

Crothers had guest roles on Alfred Hitchcock Presents in 1958, Dragnet in 1967, Bewitched and McMillan & Wife in 1971, Adam-12 in 1972 (as "George Strothers"), Kojak and Ironside in 1973, Kolchak: The Night Stalker, Mannix and Sanford and Son in 1974, Starsky & Hutch in 1977, Charlie's Angels and The Love Boat in 1978, Magnum, P.I. in 1980, Benson in 1982, and Taxi in 1983. Also in 1980, he was on two episodes of Laverne & Shirley as a porter. In the 1980s, he provided the voice of the Autobot Jazz on the television series The Transformers. He starred in three short-lived 1980s television series: One of the Boys (1982), Casablanca (1983), and Morningstar/Eveningstar (1986).

== Personal life and death ==
Crothers was married to his wife Helen for 49 years until his death. They had a daughter.

Around 1985, Crothers was diagnosed with an inoperable malignant tumor in his lung which metastasized to his esophagus. He was bedridden weeks before his death and had slipped into a coma. On November 22, 1986, Crothers died at age 76 at his home in Van Nuys, California. He is buried at Forest Lawn Memorial Park Cemetery in Los Angeles.

== Awards and honors ==
- Best Supporting Actor, Saturn Award, Academy of Science Fiction, Fantasy, and Horror, for The Shining (1980)
- Star on Hollywood Walk of Fame, 1981
- NAACP Image Award
- Black Filmmakers Hall of Fame, 1987 (posthumous)

== Filmography ==
=== Film ===
- King Cole Trio & Benny Carter Orchestra (1950) (short subject) as himself
- Yes Sir, Mr. Bones (1951) as Scatman
- The Return of Gilbert and Sullivan (1952)
- Meet Me at the Fair (1953) as Enoch Jones
- Surprising Suzie (1953) (short subject)
- East of Sumatra (1953) as Baltimore
- Walking My Baby Back Home (1953) as Smiley Gordon
- Johnny Dark (1954)
- Team Berlin (1955) (short subject)
- Tarzan and the Trappers (1958) as Tyana
- Porgy and Bess (1959) as Crabman
- The Sins of Rachel Cade (1961) as Musinga
- The Patsy (1964) as the Shoeshine Boy
- Bloody Mama (1970) as Moses the Caretaker
- The Aristocats (1970) as Scat Cat (voice)
- Chandler (1971) as Smoke
- Lady Sings the Blues (1972) as Big Ben
- The King of Marvin Gardens (1972) as Lewis
- Detroit 9000 (1973) as Reverend Markham
- Slaughter's Big Rip-Off (1973) as Cleveland
- Black Belt Jones (1974) as Pop Byrd
- Truck Turner (1974) as Duke
- Win, Place or Steal (1974) as the Attendant
- Linda Lovelace for President (1975) as Super Black
- The Fortune (1975) as the Fisherman
- Coonskin (1975) as Pappy / Old Man Bone (voice)
- One Flew Over the Cuckoo's Nest (1975) as Mr. Turkle
- Friday Foster (1975) as Noble Franklin
- Stay Hungry (1976) as William
- The Shootist (1976) as Moses Brown
- Chesty Anderson, USN (1976) as Ben Benson
- Silver Streak (1976) as Ralson, a Railroad Porter
- Mean Dog Blues (1978) as Mudcat
- The Cheap Detective (1978) as Tinker
- Scavenger Hunt (1979) as Sam
- Banjo the Woodpile Cat (1979) as Crazy Legs (voice)
- The Shining (1980) as Dick Hallorann
- Bronco Billy (1980) as Doc Lynch
- The Harlem Globetrotters on Gilligan's Island (1981) (made for TV) as Dewey Stevens
- Zapped! (1982) as Coach Dexter Jones
- Deadly Eyes (1982) as George Foskins
- Twilight Zone: The Movie (1983) as Mr. Bloom (segment "Kick the Can")
- Two of a Kind (1983) as Earl
- The Journey of Natty Gann (1985) as Sherman
- Morningstar/Eveningstar (1986) (TV Series) as Excell Dennis
- The Transformers: The Movie (1986) as Jazz (voice)
- Rock Odyssey (1987) as Jukebox (voice), posthumous release

=== Television ===
- The Adventures of Jim Bowie (1957) (Season 2 Episode 6: "The Quarantine") – Cicero
- Alfred Hitchcock Presents (1958) (Season 4 Episode 2: "Don't Interrupt") – Timothy
- Beany and Cecil (1959–1962) (multiple episodes and bumpers) - Go Man Van Gogh / Wildman of Wildsville (singing voice only at first, then regular voice)
- Bonanza (1961) (Season 3 Episode 1: "The Smiler") – Jud
- The Famous Adventures of Mr. Magoo (1964–1965) (voice)
- Dragnet (1967) (Season 2 Episode 10: "The Missing Realtor") – Dave Richmond
- Love, American Style (1970) (Episode 34 "Love and the Dummies" - Drummer)
- Harlem Globetrotters (1970–1971) (22 episodes) – George 'Meadowlark' Lemon (voice)
- Bewitched (1971) (Season 8 Episode 13: "Three Men and a Witch on a Horse") – Handler
- Nichols (1972) (Season 1 Episode 14: "Eddie Joe") – Jack
- The New Scooby-Doo Movies (1972–73) (9 episodes)
  - (Season 1 Episode 12: "The Ghostly Creep from the Deep") as George 'Meadowlark' Lemon (voice)
  - (Season 2 Episode 1: "The Mystery of Haunted Island") as George 'Meadowlark' Lemon (voice) (credited as Benjamin Crothers)
  - (Season 2 Episode 2: "The Haunted Showboat") as Additional voices (voice, credit only) (credited as Benjamin Crothers)
  - (Season 2 Episode 3: "Mystery in Persia") as Additional voices (voice, credit only) (credited as Benjamin Crothers)
  - (Season 2 Episode 4: "The Spirited Spooked Sports Show") as Additional voices (voice, credit only) (credited as Benjamin Crothers)
  - (Season 2 Episode 5: "The Exterminator") as Additional voices (voice, credit only) (credited as Benjamin Crothers)
  - (Season 2 Episode 6: "The Weird Winds on Winona") as Additional voices (voice, credit only) (credited as Benjamin Crothers)
  - (Season 2 Episode 7: "The Haunted Candy Factory") as Additional voices (voice, credit only)
- Kojak (1973) (Season 1 Episode 7: "The Corrupter") – Gaylord Fuller
- The Sty of the Blind Pig (1974) (Television Film) - Jim "Doc" Sweet
- Hong Kong Phooey (1974) (16 episodes) – Hong Kong Phooey / Penrod 'Penry' Pooch
- Mannix (1974) Season 8 Episode 5: "The Green Man") – Mudcat
- The Odd Couple (1974) (Season 5 Episode 8: "The Subway Show")
- McMillan & Wife (1974) (Season 4 Episode 1: "Downshift to Danger") – Floyd
- Chico and the Man (1974–78) (65 episodes) - Louie Wilson, the Garbage Man
- Sanford and Son (1975) (Season 4 Episode 16: "The Stand-In") – Bowlegs
- Roots (1977) (TV miniseries) (Episode: "Part VI") – Mingo
- Dean Martin Celebrity Roast: Angie Dickinson (1977) (TV Special) – Himself
- Laff-A-Lympics (1977) (2 episodes) – Hong Kong Phooey / Additional voices (voice)
  - (Season 1 Episode 9: "Spain and the Himalayas")
  - (Episode: "Acapulco/England")
- CB Bears (1977) – Segment Title Narrator
- Starsky and Hutch (1977) (Season 2 Episode 23: "Long Walk Down a Short Dirt Road") – Fireball
- The Skatebirds (1977–1978) – Scat Cat (voice)
- Captain Caveman and the Teen Angels (1977–80) (2 episodes) – Additional Voices
  - (Season 1 Episode 15: "The Mystery Mansion Mix-Up") (1977)
  - (Season 3 Episode 3: "Cavey and the Volcanic Villain") (1980)
- NBC Salutes the 25th Anniversary of the Wonderful World of Disney (1978) (TV Movie documentary) – Himself
- Charlie's Angels (1978) (Season 3 Episode 1: "Angels in Vegas") – Jip Baker
- Vega$ (1978–79) (2 episodes)
  - (Season 1 Pilot Episode: "High Roller") (1978) - Rosie
  - (Season 2 Episode 2: "The Usurper") (1979) – Rosie
- The Love Boat (1978–1984) (3 episodes)
  - (Season 1 Episode 17: "Winner Take Love/The Congressman Was Indiscreet/Isaac's History Lesson") (1978) – Virgil 'Scattergun' Gibson
  - (Season 8 Episode 14: "Country Blues/A Matter of Taste/Frat Brothers Forever") (1984) - Malcolm
  - (Season 8 Episode 15: "Santa, Santa, Santa/Another Dog Gone Christmas/Noel's Christmas Carol") (segment: "Santa, Santa, Santa") (1984) - Malcolm, a Shakespearean actor competing with Ray Walston and Avery Schreiber in the Christmas-themed vignette
- The Super Globetrotters (1979) (13 episodes) – Nate Branch / Liquid Man
- The Incredible Hulk (1979) (Season 3 Episode 5: "My Favorite Magician") – Edgar McGee
- Laverne & Shirley (1980) (2 episodes) – Porter
  - (Season 5 Episode 20: "Murder on the Moosejaw Express: Part 1")
  - (Season 5 Episode 21: "Murder on the Moosejaw Express: Part 2")
- Magnum, P.I. (1981) (Season 1 Episode 10: "Lest We Forget") – Tickler
- Trollkins (1981) (13 episodes) – Additional Voices
- The Harlem Globetrotters on Gilligan's Island (1981) (TV Movie) – Dewey Stevens
- Jokebook (1982) – Main Title Singer (voice)
- Benson (1982) (Season 3 Episode 18: "In the Red") – Reverend Tompkins
- Madame's Place (1982) (Season 1 Episode 48: "Bankrupt and Suicidal") as himself
- Casablanca (1983) (5 episodes) – Sam
  - (Season 1 Episode 1: "Who Am I Killing")
  - (Season 1 Episode 2: "Master Builder's Woman")
  - (Season 1 Episode 3: "Jenny")
  - (Season 1 Episode 4: "The Cashier and the Belly Dancer")
  - (Season 1 Episode 5: "Divorce Casablanca Style")
- Taxi (1983) (Season 5 Episode 23: "A Grand Gesture") – Walt
- This Is Your Life (1984) (Episode: "Scatman Crothers") – Himself
- The Transformers (1984–86) (33 episodes) – voice of Autobot Jazz
- The Paper Chase (1985) (Season 3 Episode 12: "Lasting Impressions") – Mr. Sims
- Paw Paws (1985–86) (21 episodes) – Eugene the Genie
- The Wonderful World of Jonathan Winters (1986) – Himself

== Discography ==
- Rock 'N Roll With "Scat Man" (1956)
- 4 A.M. (1960)
- Comedy Sweepstakes (1961)
- Big Ben Sings (1973)

Preceded by Role originated	Voice of Jazz; 1984–1986; Original Series and Animated Movie	Succeeded by Andrew Kishino; 2007; Video Game
