= Christopher Anne Templeton =

American actress

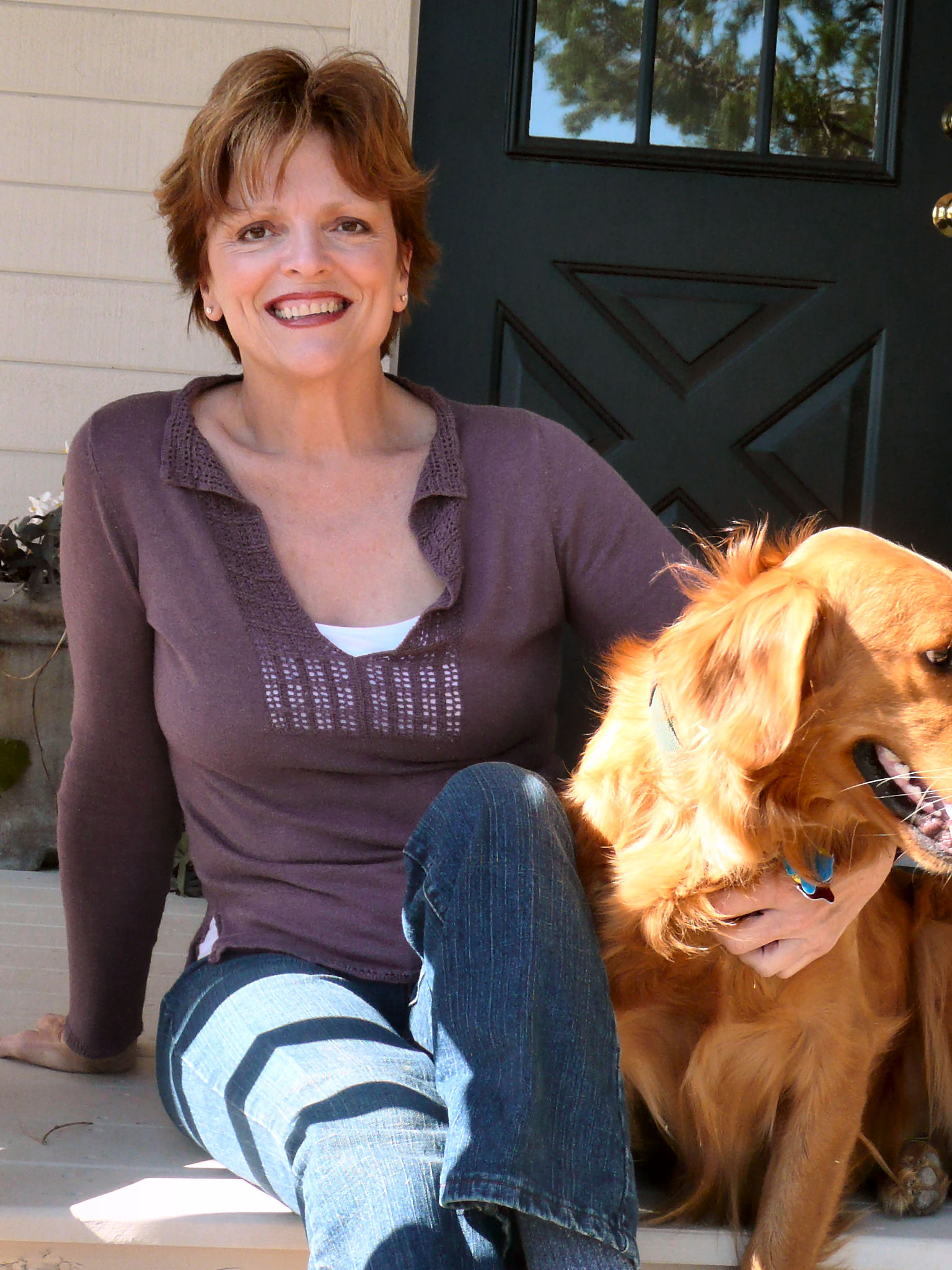
- Christopher Templeton on the steps of her home in Grey Forest, Texas in March 2008
- Born: Christopher Anne Templeton; February 26, 1952; Lake Forest, Illinois, United States
- Died: February 15, 2011 (aged 58); San Antonio, Texas, United States
- Occupation: actor

Christopher Anne Templeton (February 26, 1952 – February 15, 2011) was an American film and television actress. She played Carol Robbins Evans on the CBS soap opera The Young and the Restless from 1983 to 1992.

== Known early life ==
Templeton was born in Lake Forest, Illinois, and named after the character of Christopher Robin in the Winnie The Pooh books written by A. A. Milne. She contracted polio at six months. She managed to survive and routinely underwent physical therapy until she was eight years old. In a 1990 interview, Templeton said that when she recovered, she got back 65 percent of movement in her left leg but only 10 percent in her right leg. As a result, she spent the rest of her life with a limp.

== Known career ==
Deciding on an acting career, Templeton traveled to Los Angeles to pursue it. Upon her arrival, she not only faced the same problems as any aspiring actress—a shortage of acting roles and an abundance of competitors for those roles—but also the obstacle of her irreversible disability; she went to her auditions wearing a brace and sometimes carrying a cane. Though her disability would have seemed to spell professional doom in a business where almost "everybody is body beautiful," as she phrased it in an interview she gave in 1984, Templeton persisted. It paid off with her winning several roles in feature films and guest roles on TV dramas. She also played Christine Tate in the episode "Ladybug, Ladybug" of In the Heat of the Night.

In 1983, Templeton began appearing regularly on the CBS daytime serial The Young and the Restless, in the role of Carol Robbins, loyal secretary to Jack Abbott (then Terry Lester, and later Peter Bergman). During a day off from her work on the soap, Templeton spoke to reporter Joseph Levy about the way TV deals with the disabled and the difficulties she faced because of her condition.

Templeton played the role of Robbins for a total of eight years, finally leaving the cast in 1992. She also made an appearance as Hedda Hatter on Adventures in Wonderland.

== Later years and death ==
After leaving The Young and the Restless, Templeton continued to pursue her career as not only an actress in but also a writer and director of a number of independent films for the remaining nine years of her life.

Templeton died of metastatic breast cancer in San Antonio, Texas, on February 15, 2011.

=== Legacy ===
Templeton was the first known disabled actress to receive many contract roles.

== Filmography ==
Year	Film	Role	Other notes
1984-1992	The Young and the Restless (TV series)	Carol Robbins (later Carol Robbins Evans)	
1985	The Fall Guy		
Aired May 2, 1989	In the Heat of the Night (TV series) Season 2, episode 20: "Lady Bug, Lady Bug"	Christine Tate	A handicapped woman tricks her boyfriend into murdering her husband.
1992	Adventures in Wonderland	Hedda Hatter	
