= Swing (2003 film) =

- Directed by: Martin Guigui
- Written by: Mary Keil
- Produced by: Debbie Brubaker; Elizabeth Estrada; John Harvey; Mary Keil; Ned Kopp; Ken Patton; Jan St. John; Dahlia Waingort; Jenni Gold
- Starring: Jacqueline Bisset; Innis Casey; Jonathan Winters; Tom Skerritt; Nell Carter; Mindy Cohn; Barry Bostwick
- Cinematography: Massimo Zeri
- Edited by: Charles B. Weber
- Music by: Gennaro Cannelora; Israel Tanenbaum; Martin Guigui
- Release date: October 9, 2003
- Country: United States
- Language: English

Swing is an American romantic comedy film directed by Martin Guigui and starring Jacqueline Bisset, Innis Casey, Jonathan Winters, Tom Skerritt, Nell Carter, Mindy Cohn, and Barry Bostwick.

== Plot ==
Anthony is caught between dreams of being a musician and pleasing his father and fiancé. Encouraged by his great uncle, Anthony finds inspiration from a mysterious older woman in an other worldly night club, who teaches him to find happiness through swing dancing.

== Cast ==
- Jacqueline Bisset as Christine / Mrs. DeLuca
- Innis Casey as Anthony Verdi
- Tom Skerritt as George Verdi
- Jonathan Winters as Uncle Bill
- Constance Brenneman as Tina
- Nell Carter as Grace
- Dahlia Waingort as Valerie
- Adam Tomei as Mac
- Barry Bostwick as Freddie
- Mindy Cohn as Martha
- Jim Hanks as Club Jimbo Maitre D'

== Reception ==
On the review aggregator website Rotten Tomatoes, 42% of 12 critics' reviews are positive, with an average rating of 5.1/10. Metacritic, which uses a weighted average, assigned the film a score of 36 out of 100, based on nine critics, indicating "generally unfavorable" reviews.

== Sources ==
- sfgate.com
- http://www.nytimes.com/2004/07/09/movies/film-review-a-sexy-ghost-can-be-a-great-dance-partner.html
