= Jonathan Winters =

American comedian, actor and artist (1925–2013)

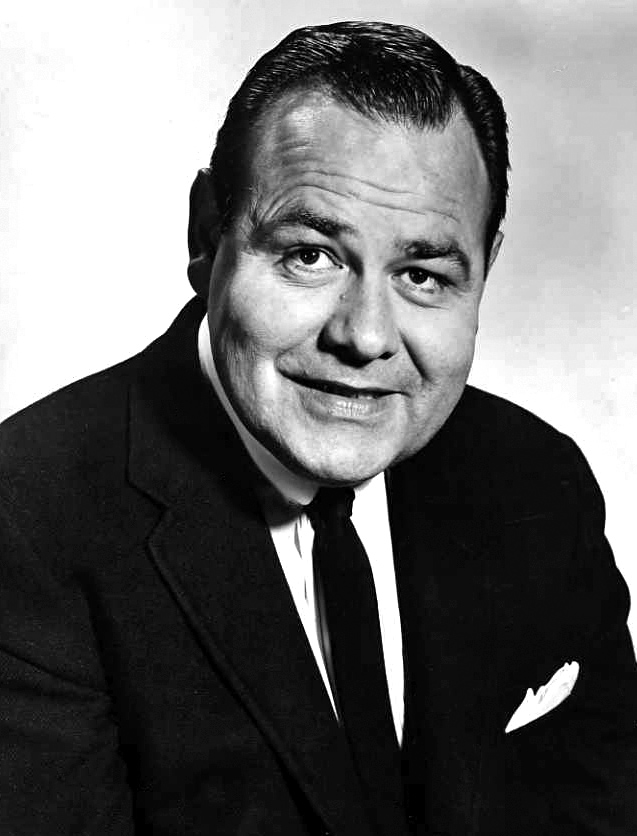
- Winters in 1963
- Born: Jonathan Harshman Winters III; November 11, 1925; Dayton, Ohio, U.S.
- Died: April 11, 2013 (aged 87); Montecito, California, U.S.
- Spouse: Eileen Schauder (m. 1948; died 2009)
- Children: 2

Comedy career
- Years active: 1949–2013
- Medium: Stand-up, film, television, books
- Genres: Character comedy, improvisational comedy
- Military career
- Allegiance: United States
- Branch: United States Marines
- Service years: 1943–1946
- Rank: Corporal
- Conflicts: World War II; Pacific War
- Website: www.jonathanwinters.com

Jonathan Harshman Winters III (November 11, 1925 – April 11, 2013) was an American comedian, actor, author, television host and artist. He started performing as a stand-up comedian before transitioning his career to acting in film and television. Winters received numerous accolades including two Grammy Awards, a Primetime Emmy Award, as well as a star on the Hollywood Walk of Fame in 1960, the American Academy of Achievement in 1973, and the Mark Twain Prize for American Humor in 1999.

Beginning in 1960, Winters recorded many classic comedy albums for the Verve Records label including The Wonderful World of Jonathan Winters (1960). He also had records released every decade for over 50 years, receiving 11 Grammy nominations, including eight for Best Comedy Album, during his career. From these nominations, he won the Grammy Award for Best Album for Children for his contribution to an adaptation of The Little Prince in 1975, and the Grammy Award for Best Spoken Comedy Album for Crank(y) Calls in 1996.

With a career spanning more than six decades, Winters also appeared in hundreds of television shows and films, including eccentric characters on The Steve Allen Show, The Garry Moore Show, The Wacky World of Jonathan Winters (1972–74), Mork & Mindy and Hee Haw.

For his role as 'Lennie Pike' in the 1963 comedy film It's a Mad, Mad, Mad, Mad World, he received a nomination for the Golden Globe Award for Best Actor – Motion Picture Musical or Comedy. In 1991, Winters won the Primetime Emmy Award for Outstanding Supporting Actor in a Comedy Series for playing Gunny Davis in the short-lived sitcom Davis Rules. In 2002, he was nominated for the Primetime Emmy Award for Outstanding Guest Actor in a Comedy Series for his performance as Q.T. Marlens on Life with Bonnie. In 2008, Winters was presented with a Pioneer TV Land Award by Robin Williams.

He also voiced Grandpa Smurf on The Smurfs. Over twenty years later, Winters was introduced to a new generation through voicing Papa Smurf in The Smurfs (2011) and The Smurfs 2 (2013). Winters died nine days after recording his dialogue for The Smurfs 2. The film was dedicated to his memory. Winters also spent time painting and presenting his artwork, including silkscreens and sketches, in many gallery shows. He wrote several books including his book of short stories entitled Winters' Tales (1988).

== Early life ==
Winters was born in Dayton, Ohio, to Alice Kilgore Rodgers and Jonathan Harshman Winters II, an insurance agent who later became an investment broker. He was a descendant of Valentine Winters, founder of the Winters National Bank in Dayton, Ohio.

When he was seven, his parents separated. Winters' mother took him to Springfield, Ohio, to live with his maternal grandmother. "Mother and dad didn't understand me; I didn't understand them," Winters told Jim Lehrer on The News Hour with Jim Lehrer in 1999. "So consequently it was a strange kind of arrangement." Alone in his room, he created characters and interviewed himself. A poor student, Winters continued talking to himself and developed a repertoire of strange sound effects. He often entertained his high school friends by imitating a race at the Indianapolis Motor Speedway.

In another television interview, Winters described how deeply he was hurt by his parents' divorce. He fought youthful tormentors who ridiculed him for not having a father in his life. When the tormentors were not around, he would go to a building or tree and weep in despair. Winters said that he learned to laugh at his situation but admitted that his adult life had been a response to sorrow.

During his senior year at Springfield High School, Winters quit school, joined the U.S. Marine Corps at the age of seventeen and served 2 1/2 years in the Pacific Theater during World War II. Upon his return, he attended Kenyon College. He later studied cartooning at Dayton Art Institute, where he met Eileen Schauder, whom he married on September 11, 1948. He was a brother of the Delta Kappa Epsilon fraternity (Lambda chapter).

== Early career ==
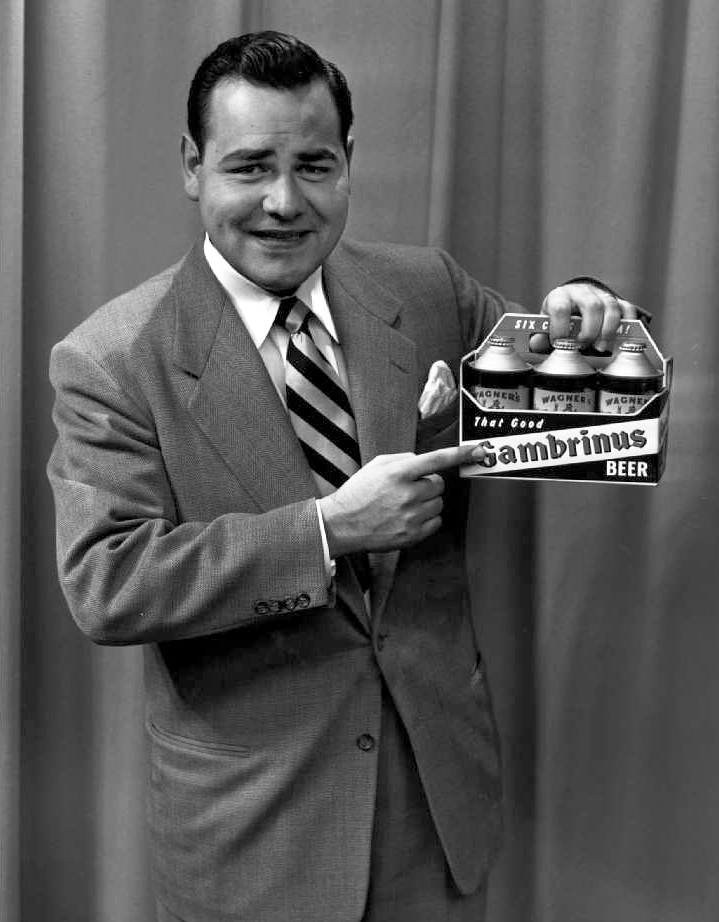
"Johnny" Winters promoting Gambrinus Beer in the early 1950s for August Wagner Breweries, Inc. on WBNS-TV in Columbus, Ohio

Winters's career started from a lost wristwatch about six or seven months after his marriage to Eileen in 1948. The newlyweds couldn't afford to buy another one; then Eileen read about a talent contest in which the first prize was a wristwatch and encouraged Jonathan to "go down and win it." She was certain he could, and he did. His performance led to a disc jockey job, where he was supposed to introduce songs and announce the temperature. Gradually his ad libs, personae, and antics took over the show. He began acting along with developing comedy routines while studying at Kenyon College in Gambier, Ohio. He was also a local radio personality on WING (mornings, 6 to 8) in Dayton, Ohio, and at WIZE in Springfield, Ohio. He performed as "Johnny Winters" on WBNS-TV in Columbus, Ohio, for 2 1/2 years. Jerome R. "Ted" Reeves, then program director for WBNS-TV, arranged for his first audition with CBS in New York City.

After promising his wife that he would return to Dayton if he did not make it in a year, and with $56.46 in his pocket, he moved to New York City, staying with friends in Greenwich Village. After obtaining Martin Goodman as his agent, he began stand-up routines in various New York nightclubs. His earliest network television appearance was in 1954 on Chance of a Lifetime, hosted by Dennis James on the DuMont Television Network, where Winters again appeared as "Johnny Winters".

Winters made television history in 1956 when RCA broadcast the first public demonstration of color videotape on The Jonathan Winters Show. Author David Hajdu wrote in The New York Times (2006), "He soon used video technology 'to appear as two characters,' bantering back and forth, seemingly in the studio at the same time. You could say he invented the video stunt."

His big break occurred (with the revised name of Jonathan) when he worked for Alistair Cooke on the CBS Television Sunday morning show Omnibus. In 1957 he performed in the first color television show, a 15-minute routine sponsored by Tums.

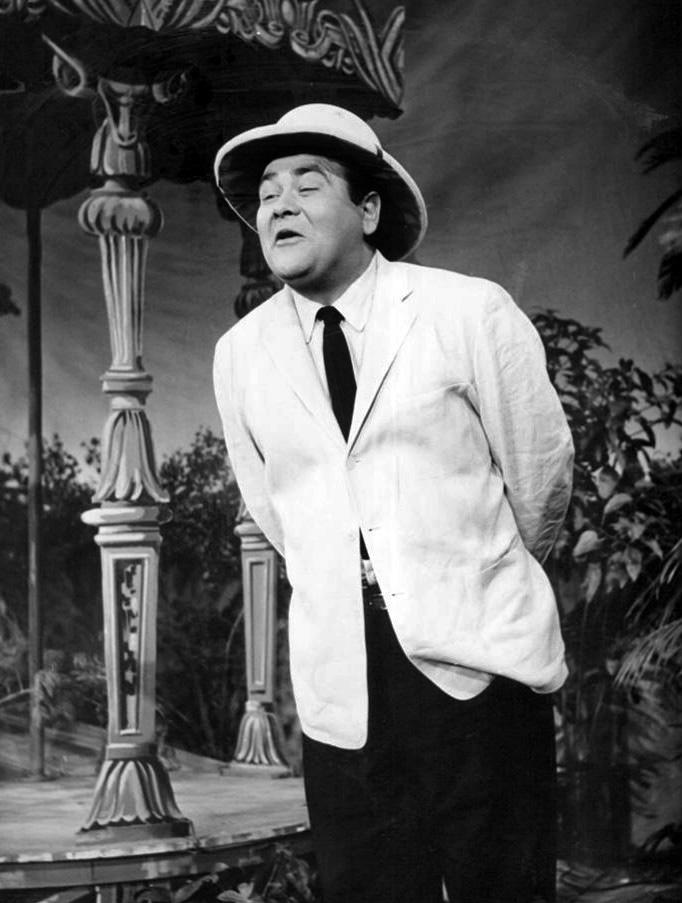
Winters performing a routine on The NBC Comedy Hour (1956)

From 1959 to 1964, his voice was heard in a series of popular television commercials for Utica Club beer. In the ads, he provided the voices of talking beer steins named Shultz and Dooley. Later, he became a spokesman for Hefty brand trash bags, for whom he appeared as a dapper garbageman known for collecting "gahr-bahj," as well as "Maude Frickert" and other characters. Winters also appeared in commercials as a spokesman for other brands such as Good Humor ice cream and the California Egg Commission.

Winters recorded many classic comedy albums for the Verve Records label, starting in 1960. Probably the best known of his characters from this period is "Maude Frickert", the seemingly sweet old lady with the barbed tongue (reportedly named for comedic actress Maudie Prickett). He was a favorite of Jack Paar, who hosted The Tonight Show from 1957 to 1962, and appeared frequently on his television programs, even going so far as to impersonate then U.S. president John F. Kennedy over the telephone as a prank on Paar.

Winters had a dramatic role in The Twilight Zone episode "A Game of Pool" (episode 3.5 aired on October 13, 1961). He also recorded Ogden Nash's The Carnival of the Animals poems to Camille Saint-Saëns's classical opus.

On The Tonight Show Starring Johnny Carson (1962–92), Winters usually performed in the guise of some character. Carson often did not know what Winters had planned and usually had to tease out the character's backstory during a comedic interview. Carson invented a character called "Aunt Blabby", who was similar to and possibly inspired by "Maude Frickert".

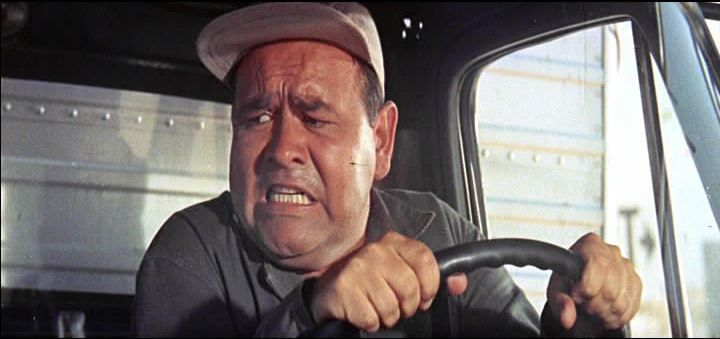
It's a Mad, Mad, Mad, Mad World (1963)

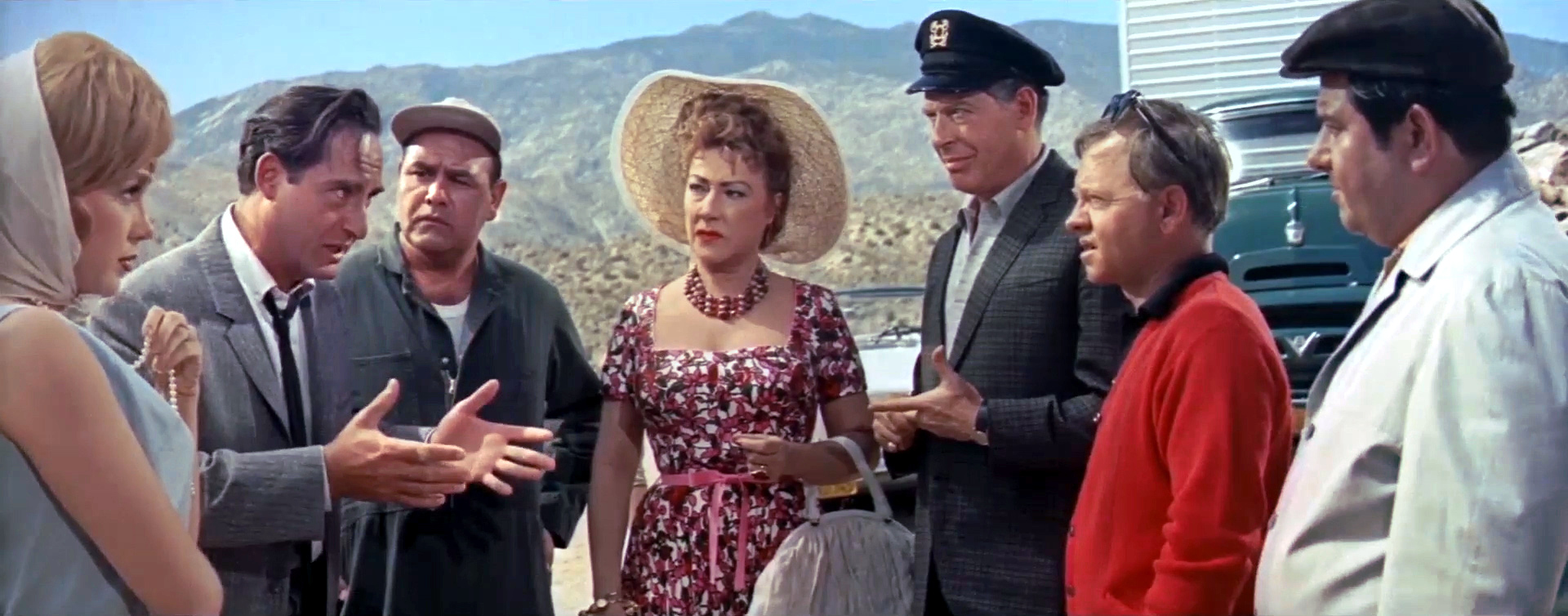
Left to right: Edie Adams, Sid Caesar, Winters, Ethel Merman, Milton Berle, Mickey Rooney and Buddy Hackett in It's a Mad, Mad, Mad, Mad World.

Winters appeared in more than 50 movies and many television shows, including particularly notable roles in the film It's a Mad, Mad, Mad, Mad World and in the dual roles of Henry Glenworthy and his dark, scheming brother, the Rev. Wilbur Glenworthy, in the film adaptation of Evelyn Waugh's novel The Loved One. Fellow comedians who starred with him in Mad World, such as Arnold Stang, said that in the long periods while they waited between scenes, Winters entertained them for hours in their trailer by becoming any character that they suggested to him.

From December 1967 to June 1969, Winters helmed his own hour-long weekly variety program on CBS (similar to the then-popular Red Skelton and Carol Burnett shows on the same network). The Jonathan Winters Show featured guest stars of comedy and music (e.g. The Doors), recurring sketches (often featuring Winters characters such as Maude Frickert, rural Elwood P. Suggins, drunk Harold Nermlinger, Norwegian Yorny Bjorny); and an audience-request section where Winters did impressions of persons, animals, etc. in various situations, e.g., John Wayne on the Moon. Choice bits from the latter were collected and released on a 1969 Columbia LP, "Stuff 'n' Nonsense". He later participated in ABC's The American Sportsman, hosted by Grits Gresham, who took celebrities on hunting, fishing, and shooting trips to exotic places around the world.

Winters made memorable appearances on both The Dean Martin Show and The Dean Martin Celebrity Roast, as well as being a regular on The Andy Williams Show. He also performed regularly as a panelist on The Hollywood Squares. In the mid-1970s, he appeared on ABC's Good Morning America doing humorous reviews of films.

During the late 1960s, Winters acted in several film comedies, most prominently The Russians Are Coming, the Russians Are Coming (1966), and Viva Max! (1969). Additionally, he was a regular (along with Woody Allen and Jo Anne Worley) on a Saturday morning children's television program Hot Dog in the early 1970s. He also had his own syndicated show called The Wacky World of Jonathan Winters from 1972 to 1974, the music director of which, Van Alexander, was nominated for a 1973 Primetime Emmy Award for Outstanding Achievement in Music Direction of a Variety, Musical or Dramatic Program.

== 1980s and 1990s career ==
Jonathan Winters was a guest star on The Muppet Show in 1980. That same year, he also appeared in I Go Pogo (a.k.a. Pogo for President). In 1981, he was a guest on the short-lived comedy series Aloha Paradise.

In the fourth and final season of the sci-fi-styled TV comedy Mork & Mindy, Winters (one of Robin Williams's idols) was brought in as Mork & Mindy's child, Mearth. Due to the different Orkan physiology, Mork laid an egg, which grew and hatched into the much older Winters. It had been previously explained that Orkans aged "backwards," thus explaining Mearth's appearance and that of his teacher, Miss Geezba (portrayed by a then-11-year-old actress Louanne Sirota). Mork's infant son Mearth in Mork & Mindy was created in hopes of improving ratings and as an attempt to capitalize on Williams's comedic talents. Winters had previously guest-starred in Season 3, Episode 18, as Dave McConnell, Mindy's uncle. However, after multiple scheduling and cast changes, Mork & Mindy's fourth season was already quite low in the ratings and ended up being the show's last season.

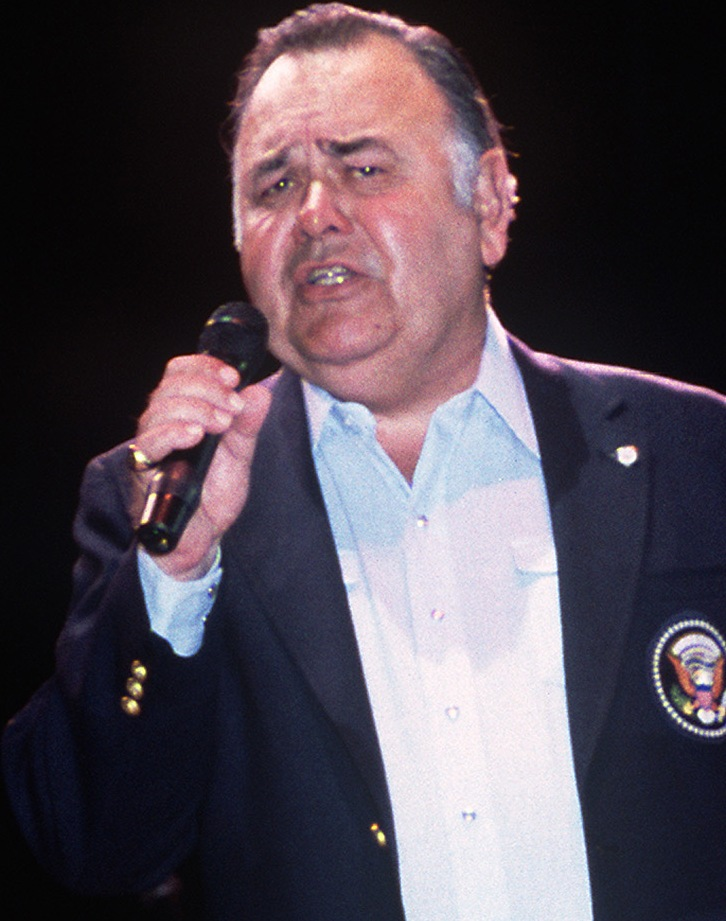
Winters performing at a USO show in 1986

Winters became a regular on Hee Haw during the 1983–1984 season. He was later the voice of Grandpa Smurf from 1986 to 1990 on the television series The Smurfs. Additionally, he did the voice of Bigelow in the 1985 TV film Pound Puppies and voice-acted on Yogi's Treasure Hunt in 1985, among other voice roles throughout the 1980s and 1990s.

In 1987, Winters was featured in NFL Films' The NFL TV Follies. That same year he published Winters' Tales: Stories and Observations for the Unusual. In 1991 and 1992, he had a supporting role on Davis Rules, a sitcom that lasted two seasons (25 episodes), for which he won a Primetime Emmy Award for Outstanding Supporting Actor in a Comedy Series. He played Gunny Davis, an eccentric grandfather helping raise his grandchildren after his son lost his wife.

In addition to his live-action roles, he was a guest star on The New Scooby-Doo Movies (in an episode where he also voiced an animated version of his "Maude Frickert" character) and as the narrator in Frosty Returns which airs annually during the Christmas season. Winters also provided the voice for the thief in The Thief and the Cobbler.

In 1994, Winters appeared as a fired factory worker (credited as "Grizzled Man") in The Flintstones. Cast against type, he was the serious-minded Police Commissioner Wainwright Barth, disapproving uncle of playboy Lamont Cranston (Alec Baldwin) in The Shadow. That same year he voiced Stinkbomb D. Basset in the episode "Smell Ya Later" on Animaniacs.

Winters received eleven Grammy nominations during his career, including eight for the Grammy Award for Best Comedy Album; he won the Grammy Award for Best Spoken Comedy Album for Crank(y) Calls in 1996.

In 1996, Winters played himself in Bloopy's Buddies, a children's TV series on PBS designed to teach children about health and nutrition and to encourage them to exercise.

In 1999, he was awarded the Kennedy Center's Mark Twain Prize for American Humor, becoming the second recipient.

== Later years ==
Winters had various roles and appeared in numerous television features throughout the early to mid-2000s. In 2000, Winters appeared in The Adventures of Rocky and Bullwinkle. In 2003, he appeared in the film Swing.

In 2004, Comedy Central Presents: 100 Greatest Stand-Ups of All Time ranked Winters as the No. 18 greatest stand-up comedian. In 2005 and 2006, Winters appeared on Jimmy Kimmel Live!.

In 2008, Winters was presented with a Pioneer TV Land Award by Robin Williams. That same year, PBS aired Pioneers of Television, and Make 'Em Laugh: The Funny Business of America in 2009, both featuring Winters.

Winters was coaxed out of retirement to voice Papa Smurf in The Smurfs (2011), the first-ever animated/live-action Smurfs film, and later in The Smurfs 2 (2013), his final film project. He died only nine days after he finished recording Papa's voice.

Winters was originally cast in Big Finish (2014), during pre-production. It is a comedy set in a retirement home. His scheduled role was to appear alongside Jerry Lewis and Bob Newhart.

== Personal life ==
Jonathan and Eileen Winters had two children.

In his interview with the Archive of American Television, Winters reported that he spent eight months in a private psychiatric hospital in 1959 and again in 1961. The comic suffered from nervous breakdowns and bipolar disorder. With unprecedented frenetic energy, Winters made obscure references to his illness and hospitalization during his stand-up routines, most famously on his 1960 comedy album, The Wonderful World of Jonathan Winters. During his classic "flying saucer" routine, Winters casually mentions that if he was not careful, the authorities might put him back in the "zoo", referring to the institution.

"These voices are always screaming to get out," Winters told the Fort Worth Star-Telegram. "They follow me around pretty much all day and night." Winters could use his talents in voice-over roles. A devotee of Groucho Marx and Laurel and Hardy, Winters once claimed, "I've done for the most part pretty much what I intended." He told U.S. News, "I ended up doing comedy, writing, and painting.... I've had a ball, and as I get older I just become an older kid."

Winters lived near Santa Barbara, California, and was often seen browsing or "hamming" for the crowd at the antique and gun shows on the Ventura County fairgrounds. He often entertained the tellers and other employees whenever he visited his local bank to make a deposit or withdrawal. Additionally, he spent his time painting and attended many gallery showings, even presenting his art in one-man shows.

On January 11, 2009, Winters's wife of more than 60 years, Eileen, died at the age of 84 after a 20-year battle with breast cancer.

== Death ==
Winters died of natural causes on the evening of April 11, 2013, in Montecito, California, at the age of 87. He was survived by his two children and five grandchildren. He was cremated, and his ashes were given to his family.

Fans of Winters placed flowers on his Hollywood Walk of Fame star on April 12, 2013, at 1:30 p.m.

Many comedians, actors, and friends gave personal tributes to Winters on social media shortly after his death. Robin Williams posted, "First he was my idol, then he was my mentor and amazing friend. I'll miss him huge. He was my Comedy Buddha. Long live the Buddha." In September 2013, at the 65th Primetime Emmy Awards, Williams again honored the career and life of Winters. The 2013 movie The Smurfs 2 was dedicated to him.

== Comedy style and legacy ==
A pioneer of improvisational stand-up comedy with a gift for mimicry, impersonations, various personalities, and a seemingly bottomless reservoir of creative energy, Winters was one of the first celebrities to go public with a personal mental illness issue and felt stigmatized as a result. According to Jack Paar, "If you were to ask me the funniest 25 people I've ever known, I'd say, 'Here they are—Jonathan Winters.'" He also said of Winters, "Pound for pound, the funniest man alive."

Known for his impressions (including ones of John Wayne, Cary Grant, Groucho Marx, James Cagney, and others) and improvisational comedy, Winters became a regular guest on late-night television during a career that spanned more than six decades. He also appeared in many television shows and films and on the comedy circuit. When audiences rose to applaud him at the start of a stage show, he was known to tell them, "Please remain standing throughout the evening."

Winters performed a wide range of characters: hillbillies, arrogant city slickers, nerve-shattered airline pilots trying to hide their fear, disgruntled westerners, judgmental Martians, little old ladies, nosy gas station attendants, a hungry cat eyeing a mouse, the oldest living airline stewardess, and more. "I was fighting for the fact that you could be funny without telling jokes," he told The New York Times, adding that he thought of himself foremost as a writer and less as a stand-up comedian. He named James Thurber's sophisticated absurdity as influential and said he idolized writers with a gift for humor.

Two of his most memorable characters, cranky granny "Maude Frickert" and bumpkin farmer "Elwood P. Suggins" ("I think eggs 24 hours a day"), were born from his early television routines. Robin Williams once told Playboy why Winters inspired him. "It was like seeing a guy behind a mask, and you could see that his characters were a great way for him to talk about painful stuff," he said. "I found out later that they are people he knows—his mother, his aunt. He's an artist who also paints with words. He paints these people that he sees."

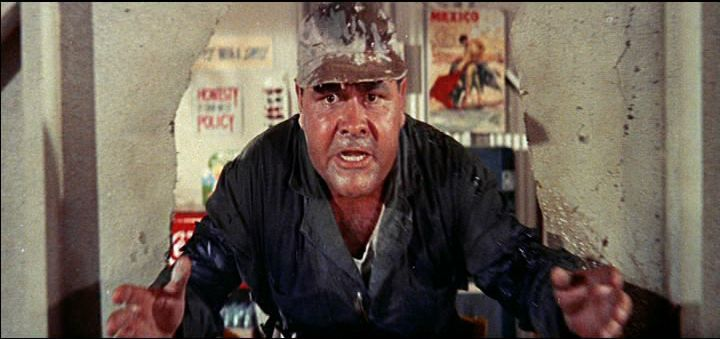
Jonathan Winters crashes through a wall in It's a Mad, Mad, Mad, Mad World (1963)

Onstage and off, Winters was wildly unpredictable. He was often viewed by producers as a liability, leading to a scattershot, though memorable, film career. On television, his two self-titled variety shows displayed him in dazzling form as a sketch comic and impersonator.

Winters was an inspiration for performers such as Johnny Carson, Billy Crystal, Tracey Ullman, Lily Tomlin, Steve Martin, Jim Carrey, and Jimmy Kimmel. Robin Williams credited Winters as his comedy mentor, and the two co-starred on Mork & Mindy.

In a 1991 interview with the Los Angeles Times, Winters likened the entertainment industry to the Olympics, with actors standing on boxes to receive gold, silver, and bronze medals. Winters claimed, "I think my place is inside the box, underneath the guy receiving the gold medal. They're playing the national anthem and I'm fondling a platinum medallion."

== Quotations ==
- "If your ship doesn't come in, swim out to meet it."
- "I couldn't wait for success, so I went ahead without it."
- "Behold the turtle; the only time he makes progress is when he sticks out his head."

== Filmography ==
=== Television and film ===
- 1956–1957: The Jonathan Winters Show – Winters credited as writer for episodes 1.2 & 1.3
- 1960: Alakazam the Great (voice) as Sir Quigley Broken Bottom (English version)
- 1961: "A Game of Pool" (episode of The Twilight Zone) as James Howard "Fats" Brown
- 1963: It's a Mad, Mad, Mad, Mad World as Lennie Pike
- 1964: The Jonathan Winters Special (TV special)
- 1965: The Jonathan Winters Show (2 specials)
- 1965: The Loved One as Henry Glenworthy & Rev. Wilbur Glenworthy
- 1966: The Russians Are Coming, the Russians Are Coming as Norman Jonas
- 1966: Penelope as Professor Klobb
- 1967: Guys 'n' Geishas (Danny Thomas special)
- 1967: Oh Dad, Poor Dad, Mamma's Hung You in the Closet and I'm Feelin' So Sad (narrator) as Dad
- 1967: Eight on the Lam as Police Sgt. Jasper Lynch & Mother Lynch
- 1967–1969: The Jonathan Winters Show (TV series)
- 1968: Now You See It, Now You Don't (TV film) as Jerry Klay
- 1969: Viva Max! as General Billy Joe Hallson
- 1970: The Wonderful World of Jonathan Winters (TV special) as himself
- 1970–1971: Hot Dog as himself
- 1972: The New Scooby-Doo Movies as himself & Maude Frickert
- 1972–1974: The Wacky World of Jonathan Winters (syndicated TV show)
- 1976: Jonathan Winters Presents 200 Years of American Humor (TV special)
- 1976: Freedom Is (voices on TV special)
- 1977: The Wonderful World of Disney: Halloween Hall o' Fame (TV special) as host
- 1977: Yabba Dabba Doo! The Happy World of Hanna-Barbera (TV special) as himself
- 1979: The Fish that Saved Pittsburgh as H.S. & Harvey Tilson
- 1980: The Muppet Show (season 4, episode 16)
- 1980: I Go Pogo (voices) as Porky Pine, Molester Mole & Wiley Catt
- 1980: More Wild, Wild West (TV film) as Albert Paradine II
- 1981: Mork & Mindy (recurring role) as Mearth
- 1984: E. Nick: A Legend in His Own Mind as Emerson Foosnagel III
- 1985: Alice in Wonderland (voice in two-part TV film) as Humpty Dumpty
- 1985: Yogi's Treasure Hunt (additional voices)
- 1986: The Longshot as Tyler
- 1986: Say Yes as W. D. Westmoreland
- 1986: The Smurfs as Grandpa Smurf
- 1986: King Kong: The Living Legend (TV special) as host
- 1987: The Little Troll Prince: A Christmas Parable (voice) as King Ulvik a.k.a. Left Head
- 1988: Moon over Parador as Ralph
- 1988: The Completely Mental Misadventures of Ed Grimley (voice) as Roger Gustav and Mr. Freebus
- 1989: Hanna-Barbera's 50th: A Yabba Dabba Doo Celebration (TV special) as himself
- 1990: Tiny Toon Adventures (voice) as Sappy Stanley in episode "Who Bopped Bugs Bunny")
- 1990: Rick Moranis in Gravedale High as Coach Cadaver
- 1991: Little Dracula as Igor & Granny
- 1991: The Wish that Changed Christmas (voice on TV special) as Owl
- 1991: Davis Rules as Gunny Davis
- 1992: Tiny Toon Adventures: How I Spent My Vacation (voice) as Wade Pig & Superman
- 1992: Frosty Returns (narrator)
- 1992: Spaced Out! (host & executive producer) – features comics such as Bonnie Hunt, Carrot Top and others
- 1993: Precious Moments: Timmy's Special Delivery (voice in Christmas movie) as Dogs & Worker No. 1
- 1994: Animaniacs as Stinkbomb D. Basset (voice) – episode "Smell Ya Later"
- 1994: Christopher and Holly a.k.a. The Bears Who Saved Christmas (voice) as Charlie the Compass
- 1994: Yogi the Easter Bear as Ranger Mortimer (voice)
- 1994: The Flintstones as Grizzled Man
- 1994: The Shadow as Wainwright Barth
- 1995: Arabian Knight (voice) as The Thief
- 1996: Bloopy's Buddies
- 2000: The Adventures of Rocky and Bullwinkle as Whoppa Chopper Pilot, Ohio Cop with Bullhorn & Jeb
- 2003: Swing as Uncle Bill
- 2004: Comic Book: The Movie as Wally (Army Buddy No. 2)
- 2004: Tell Them Who You Are (documentary film) as himself
- 2006: National Lampoon's Cattle Call as Thomas the Studio Tour Guide
- 2007: Certifiably Jonathan (honored celebrity at FGFF)
- 2011: The Smurfs as Papa Smurf (voice)
- 2013: The Smurfs 2 as Papa Smurf (voice) – released posthumously

=== Short films ===
- 1968: The Early Birds (writer and voices)
- 1975: Sonic Boom as Ed (performer)
- 2000: Edwurd Fudwupper Fibbed Big as The President (voice as "Jonathon Winters")
- 2002: Santa vs. the Snowman 3D as Santa Claus (voice)

== Discography ==
- 1960: Down to Earth
- 1960: The Wonderful World of Jonathan Winters (reissued in 2003)
- 1961: Here's Jonathan
- 1962: Another Day, Another World
- 1962: Humor Seen through the Eyes of Jonathan Winters
- 1964: Whistle Stopping with Jonathan Winters
- 1966: Movies Are Better Than Ever
- 1969: Jonathan Winters... Wings it!
- 1969: Stuff 'n Nonsense
- 1973: Jonathan Winters and Friends Laugh ... Live
- 1975: The Little Prince (featured in an adaptation with Richard Burton)
- 1987: Jonathan Winters Answers Your Telephone
- 1988: Finally Captured
- 1988: Winter's Tales (audio book)
- 1989: Jonathan Winters Tells The Story Of Peter And The Wolf
- 1989: Hang-Ups Cal'90
- 1990: Into the '90s
- 1992: Jonathan Winters is Terminator 3
- 1992: Paul Bunyan
- 1993: Best of Jonathan Winters (audio cassette)
- 1995: Crank(y) Calls
- 1995: The Thief and the Cobbler a.k.a. Arabian Knight (voice of the Thief)
- 2000: Outpatients
- 2006: Old Folks
- 2007: The Underground Tapes
- 2007: A Christmas Carol
- 2007: Maude Frickert [explicit]
- 2009: A Very Special Time
- 2011: Final Approach
- 2011: The Smurfs (voice of Papa Smurf)

=== Compilation ===
- 1963: Jonathan Winters' Mad, Mad, Mad, Mad World (in conjunction with the film of the same name)

=== Video releases ===
- 1968: Jonathan Winters: The Lost Episodes (VHS) – rare TV footage from the 1950s and 1960s including Mickey Rooney, Art Carney, Dinah Shore, Jack Paar, Louis Nye and others
- 1986: Say Yes (VHS)
- 1986: Jonathan Winters: Madman of Comedy (VHS)
- 1987: On the Ledge (VHS)
- 1991: Johnny Carson with Jonathan Winters and Robin Williams – Clarence Thomas Supreme Court nomination
- 1995: Jonathan Winters: Gone Fish'n (VHS/DVD) – Winters also credited as editor
- 2000: The Unknown Jonathan Winters: On the Loose (VHS/DVD)
- 2005: Jonathan Winters: Rare and Riotous (VHS/DVD)
- 2007: Certifiably Jonathan (DVD) – features Howie Mandel, Tim Conway, Jimmy Kimmel, Sarah Silverman and others
- 2011: Jonathan Winters: Birth of a Genius (DVD)

== Bibliography ==
- Mouse Breath, Conformity and Other Social Ills (1965) – hardcover
- Winters' Tales: Stories and Observations for the Unusual (1st edition 1987; 2nd edition 1993; 3rd edition 2001) – paperback
- Hang-Ups: Paintings by Jonathan Winters (1st edition 1988) – hardcover
- Jonathan Winters: After The Beep (1989) – paperback
- Jonathan Winters' A Christmas Carol (aired on NPR 1990 & published on CD 2007) – audiobook
- Maude Frickert Tells All (2010) – hardcover

Preceded by Jack Angel	Voice of Papa Smurf; 2011–2013; The Smurfs and The Smurfs 2	Succeeded by Mandy Patinkin
