= Armelia McQueen =

American actress (1952–2020)

- McQueen in Ain't Misbehavin', 1982
- Born: Armelia Audrey McQueen; January 6, 1952; Southern Pines, North Carolina, U.S.
- Died: October 3, 2020 (aged 68); Los Angeles, California, U.S.
- Occupation: Actress
- Years active: 1976–2018

Armelia Audrey McQueen (January 6, 1952 – October 3, 2020) was an American actress. She is best known for her roles in the Broadway musical Ain't Misbehavin' (1978–1982, 1988–1989), the film Ghost (1990), and the television series Adventures in Wonderland (1992–1994).

== Background ==
Armelia McQueen was born January 6, 1952, in Southern Pines, North Carolina. Following the divorce of McQueen's parents, her mother married Robert Brown in New York City. In Brooklyn, McQueen attended P.S. 44 and P.S. 258. She graduated from Central Commercial High School in 1969. McQueen then attended the Fashion Industry School, majoring in fashion design. In 1972, she attended Herbert Berghof's Drama School.

McQueen died on October 3, 2020, at the age of 68.

== Stage ==
- Ain't Misbehavin' (1978)
- Harrigan 'N Hart (1985)
- Ain't Misbehavin' (1988)

== Television shows ==
- Adventures in Wonderland (100 episodes)
- Martin (1992)
- Fresh Prince of Bel-Air (1993)
- Living Single (1996)
- All About the Andersons (2003)
- That's So Raven (2004)
- Related (2005)
- Hart of Dixie (26 episodes)
- Brooklyn Nine-Nine (2014)
- Artbound (2018) 1 episode

== Movies ==
| Year | Title | Role | Notes |
|---|---|---|---|
| 1976 | Sparkle | Tune Ann | |
| 1981 | Quartet | Night Club Singer | |
| 1988 | Action Jackson | Dee | |
| 1989 | No Holds Barred | Sadie | |
| 1990 | Ghost | Clara Brown | |
| 1998 | Bulworth | Ruthie | |
| 1999 | Life | Mrs. Clay | |
