= Nell Carter =

American singer and actress (1948–2003)

- Carter in 1981
- Born: Nell Ruth Hardy; September 13, 1948; Birmingham, Alabama, U.S.
- Died: January 23, 2003 (aged 54); Beverly Hills, California, U.S.
- Resting place: Hillside Memorial Park Cemetery
- Other name: Nell Ruth Carter
- Education: A. H. Parker High School
- Occupations: Actress; singer
- Years active: 1970–2003
- Known for: Nell Harper – Gimme a Break!
- Spouses: George Krynicki (m. 1982; div. 1992) Roger Larocque (m. 1992; div. 1993)
- Partner: Ann Kaser (?–2003)
- Children: 3

Nell Carter (born Nell Ruth Hardy; September 13, 1948 – January 23, 2003) was an American actress and singer.

Carter began her career in 1970, singing in the theater, and later began work on television. She was best known for her role as Nell Harper on the sitcom Gimme a Break!, which aired from 1981 to 1987. Carter received two Emmy and two Golden Globe award nominations for her work on the series. Prior to Gimme a Break!, Carter won a Tony Award for Best Performance by a Featured Actress in a Musical in 1978 for her performance in the Broadway musical Ain't Misbehavin' as well as a Primetime Emmy Award for her reprisal of the role on television in 1982.

== Early life ==
Nell Ruth Hardy was born on September 13, 1948 in Birmingham, Alabama, one of nine children born to Edna Mae and Horace Hardy. She was born into a Catholic family and raised Presbyterian. Carter later self-identified as Pentecostal and as Jewish.

At the age of two, Hardy witnessed her father's electrocution when he stepped on a live power line.

As a child, she began singing on a local gospel radio show and was also a member of the church choir. At age 15, she began performing at area coffee houses, and later joined the Renaissance Ensemble that played at coffee houses and gay bars.

On July 5, 1965 at the age of 16, Hardy was raped at gunpoint by a man who she knew. She became pregnant as a result of the rape and gave birth to daughter Tracey the next year. Finding raising a baby alone too difficult, she sent her child to live with her older sister Willie. She later claimed that Tracey was the product of a brief marriage, but she revealed the truth in a 1994 interview.

== Career ==
=== Broadway work ===
At age 19, Hardy changed her surname to Carter and left Birmingham, Alabama, moving to New York City with the Renaissance Ensemble, where she sang in coffee shops, nightclubs and bathhouses before landing her first Broadway role in 1971.

Carter made her Broadway debut in the 1971 rock opera Soon, which closed after three performances. She was the music director for the 1974 Westbeth Playwrights Feminist Collective's production of What Time of Night It Is. Carter appeared with Bette Davis in the 1974 stage musical Miss Moffat, based on Davis' earlier film The Corn Is Green, but the show closed before reaching Broadway.

Carter became a star for her role in the musical Ain't Misbehavin, for which she won a Tony Award in 1978. She later won an Emmy for the same role in a televised performance in 1982.

In 1978, Carter was cast as Effie White in the Broadway workshop musical Project #9 (later retitled Dreamgirls) but departed the production during development to take a television role on Ryan's Hope.

Carter's additional Broadway credits include Dude and the 20th-anniversary production of Annie, in which she played Miss Hannigan.

=== Film and television ===
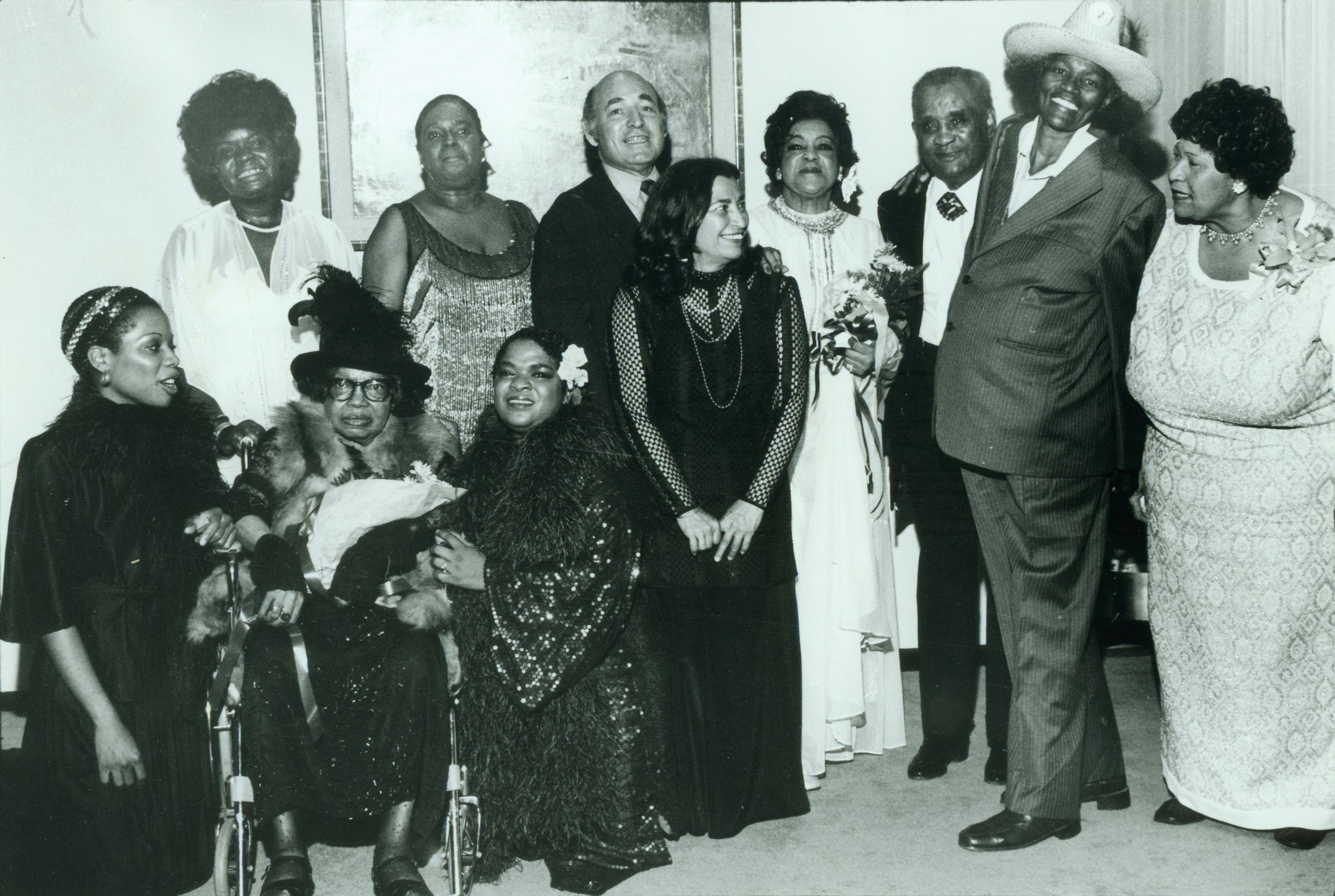
Carter (bottom row sitting down, furthest right) in 1980

In 1979, Carter had a part in the Miloš Forman-directed musical adaptation of Hair and her voice is heard on the film's soundtrack.

In 1981, she took a role on the NBC action comedy television series The Misadventures of Sheriff Lobo before landing the lead role of Nell Harper on the sitcom Gimme a Break!.

=== Gimme a Break! ===
Carter became best known to audiences for her lead role in the NBC television series Gimme a Break!, in which she played a housekeeper for a widowed police chief (Dolph Sweet) and his three daughters. The show earned Carter nominations for a Golden Globe and an Emmy Award. A total of 137 episodes of Gimme a Break! were produced over a run of six seasons, airing from 1981 to 1987.

In August 1987 after the cancellation of Gimme a Break!, Carter returned to the nightclub circuit with a five-month national tour with comedian Joan Rivers.

=== Further television and film work ===
In 1989, Carter played the assistant to a banquet-hall owner in an unsuccessful pilot for NBC titled Morton's by the Bay, which aired as a one-time special that May. In October, she performed "The Star-Spangled Banner" before Game 4 of the 1989 World Series in San Francisco.

In 1990, Carter starred in the CBS comedy You Take the Kids. The series, which was perceived as the black answer to Roseanne with its portrayal of a working-class black family, featured Carter as a crass, no-nonsense mother and wife. You Take the Kids faced poor ratings and reviews and only ran from December 1990 to January 1991.

During the early 1990s, Carter appeared in low-budget movies, television specials and game shows such as Match Game '90 and To Tell the Truth. She costarred in Hangin' with Mr. Cooper from 1993 to 1995.

In the mid-1990s, Carter appeared on Broadway in a revival of Annie as Miss Hannigan. She was upset when commercials promoting the show used white actress Marcia Lewis as Miss Hannigan. The producers stated that the commercials, which were created during an earlier production, were too costly to reshoot. However, Carter felt that racism played a part in the decision. She told the New York Post: "Maybe they don't want audiences to know Nell Carter is black. ... It hurts a lot. I've asked them nicely to stop it—it's insulting to me as a black woman." Carter was later replaced by Sally Struthers. Carter appeared as a talkative overland bus driver in the mid-1990s film Follow Your Heart, which was not released until 1998.

=== Later years ===
In 2001, Carter appeared as a special guest star on the pilot episode of Reba and continued with the show, making three appearances in Season 1. The following year, Carter made two appearances on Ally McBeal and a guest appearance on Blue's Clues.

In 2002, she rehearsed for a production of Raisin, a stage musical based on A Raisin in the Sun in Long Beach, California. She appeared in the 2003 film Swing. Her final onscreen appearance was in the comedy film Back by Midnight, released in 2005, two years after her death.

Her final recording project was a duet with Jay Levy, produced by Jay Levy for the 1998 Warner/Rhino album To Life!: Songs of Chanukah and Other Jewish Celebrations.

== Death ==
On January 23, 2003, at the age of 54, Carter collapsed and died at her home in Beverly Hills. Her son Joshua discovered her body that night. Per a provision in Carter's will, no autopsy was performed. Using blood tests, X-rays and a cursory physical examination, the Los Angeles County coroner's office ruled that Carter's death was the likely result of "probable arteriosclerotic heart disease, with diabetes a contributing condition."

Carter's partner Ann Kaser inherited her property and custody of her two sons. Carter is interred at Hillside Memorial Park Cemetery in Los Angeles.

== Personal life ==
Carter attempted suicide in the early 1980s, and around 1985 she entered a drug-detoxification facility to break a longstanding cocaine addiction. Her brother Bernard died of complications from AIDS in 1989.

She married mathematician and lumber executive George Krynicki and converted to Judaism in 1982. She filed for divorce from Krynicki in 1989 and the divorce was finalized in 1992.

Carter had three children: daughter Tracey and sons Joshua and Daniel. She adopted both Joshua and Daniel as newborns over a four-month period. She attempted to adopt twice more, but both adoptions failed. In her first attempt, she allowed a young pregnant woman to move into her home with the plan that she would adopt the child, but the mother decided to keep the baby. Carter also had three miscarriages.

In 1992, Carter had surgery to repair two aneurysms. She married Roger Larocque in June 1992 but divorced him the next year. Carter declared bankruptcy in 1995 and again in 2002.

== Stage credits ==
- Soon (1971), Broadway
- The Wedding of Iphigenia (1971), off-Broadway
- Dude (1972), Broadway
- Miss Moffat (1974), closed on the road
- Be Kind to People Week (1975), off-Broadway
- Tom Eyen's Dirtiest Musical (1975), off-Broadway
- Don't Bother Me, I Can't Cope (1976), San Francisco
- Ain't Misbehavin' (1978), Manhattan Theatre Club, Broadway and U.S. national tour
- One Night Only (1979), workshop
- Black Broadway (1979), Avery Fisher Hall
- Black Broadway (1980), The Town Hall
- Ain't Misbehavin' (1988), Broadway
- Hello, Dolly! (1991), Long Beach Civic Light Opera
- Annie (1997), Broadway and U.S. national tour
- South Pacific (2001), Pittsburgh Civic Light Opera
- The Vagina Monologues (2001), Madison Square Garden

== Filmography ==
=== Film ===
Year	Title	Role	Notes
1979	Hair	Central Park Singer	
1981	Back Roads	Waitress	
1981	Modern Problems	Dorita	
1982	Tex	Mrs. Peters	
1992	Bebe's Kids	Vivian	Voice
1995	The Crazysitter	The Warden	
1995	The Grass Harp	Catherine Creek	
1995	The Misery Brothers	Courtroom Singer	
1996	The Proprietor	Millie Jackson	
1997	Fakin' da Funk	Claire	
1999	Follow Your Heart	Bus Driver	
1999	Special Delivery		
2001	Perfect Fit	Mrs. Gordy	
2003	Swing	Grace	released posthumously
2005	Back by Midnight	Waitress	final film role; released posthumously

=== Television ===
Year	Title	Role	Notes
1978	Cindy	Olive	TV movie
1978–1979	Ryan's Hope	Ethel Green	11 episodes
1980–1981	The Misadventures of Sheriff Lobo	Sergeant Hildy Jones	15 episodes
1981–1987	Gimme a Break!	Nellie Ruth 'Nell' Harper	137 episodes
1982	The Billy Crystal Comedy Hour		Episode: #1.3
1986	Nell Carter: Never Too Old to Dream	Host	Television Special
1985	Santa Barbara	Herself	Episode 240
1986	Amen	Bess Richards	Episode: "The Courtship of Bess Richards"
1989	227	Beverly Morris	Episode: "Take My Diva...Please!"
1990	Shalom Sesame	Olive Tree (voice)	Episode: "Chanukah"
1990–1991	You Take the Kids	Nell Kirkland	6 episodes
1992	Maid for Each Other	Jasmine Jones	TV movie
1992	Final Shot: The Hank Gathers Story	Lucille Gathers	TV movie
1992	Jake and the Fatman	Ethel Mae Haven	Episode: "Ain't Misbehavin'"
1993–1995	Hangin' with Mr. Cooper	P.J. Moore	42 episodes
1995–1997	Spider-Man: The Animated Series	Glory Grant (voice)	2 episodes
1996	Can't Hurry Love	Mrs. Bradstock	Episode: "The Rent Strike"
1997	Brotherly Love	Nell Bascombe	Episode: "Paging Nell"
1997	Sparks	Barbara Rogers	Episode: "Hoop Schemes"
1997	Happily Ever After: Fairy Tales for Every Child	Mary (voice)	Episode: "Mother Goose"
1997	The Blues Brothers Animated Series	Betty Smythe (voice)	Episode: "Strange Death of Betty Smythe"
1999	Sealed with a Kiss	Mrs. Wheatley	TV movie
2001	Blue's Clues	Mother Nature (voice)	Episode: "Environments"
2001	Touched by an Angel	Cynthia Winslow	2 episodes
2001	Seven Days	Lucy	Episode: "Live: From Death Row"
2001	Reba	Dr. Susan Peters	3 episodes
2001	The Weakest Link	Herself	Classic TV Stars Edition #2
2002	Ally McBeal	Harriet Pumple	2 episodes

=== Video games ===
Year	Title	Voice
1996	You Don't Know Jack Volume 2	Herself

== Awards ==
Year	Award	Category	Title	Result
1978	Drama Desk Award	Outstanding Actress in a Musical	Ain't Misbehavin'	Won
1978	Theatre World Award	—N/a	Ain't Misbehavin'	Won
1978	Tony Award	Best Featured Actress in a Musical	Ain't Misbehavin'	Won
1982	Primetime Emmy Award	Outstanding Individual Achievement – Special Class	Ain't Misbehavin'	Won
1982	Primetime Emmy Award	Outstanding Lead Actress in a Comedy Series	Gimme a Break!	Nominated
1982	Golden Globe Award	Best Actress – Television Series Musical or Comedy	Gimme a Break!	Nominated
1983	Primetime Emmy Award	Outstanding Lead Actress in a Comedy Series	Gimme a Break!	Nominated
1984	Golden Globe Award	Best Actress – Television Series Musical or Comedy	Gimme a Break!	Nominated
