= Adventures in Wonderland (1992 TV series) =

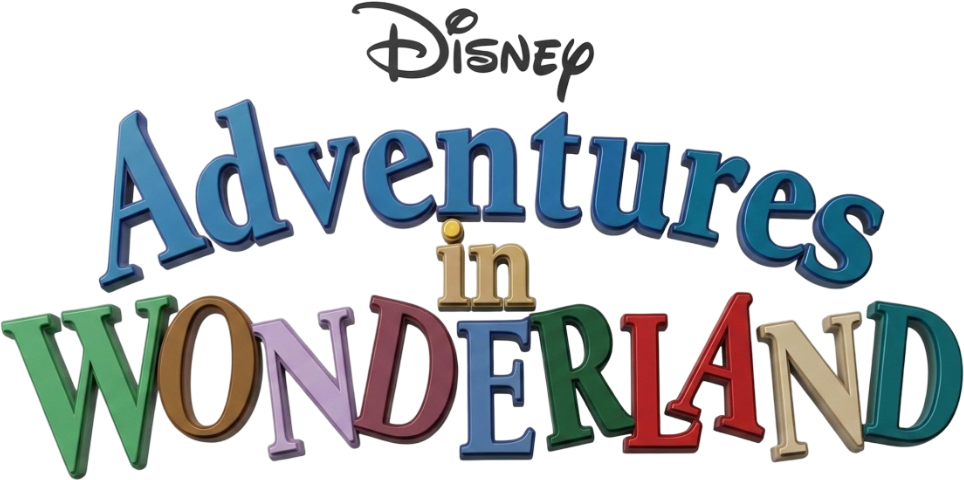
- Genre: Children's television series; Fantasy
- Developed by: The Walt Disney Company
- Starring: Elisabeth Harnois; John Robert Hoffman; Reece Holland; Armelia McQueen; Patrick Richwood; Harry Waters Jr.; Robert Barry Fleming; Wesley Mann
- Voices of: Richard Kuhlman; John Lovelady
- Opening theme: "Adventures in Wonderland Theme" by Sarah Taylor
- Ending theme: "Adventures in Wonderland Theme" (end version) by Sarah Taylor
- Composers: Mark Mothersbaugh; Bob Mothersbaugh; Denis M. Hannigan; Rusty Andrews; Josh Mancell; Ryan Moore
- Country of origin: United States
- Original language: English
- No. of seasons: 3
- No. of episodes: 100 (1 unaired)

Production
- Executive producer: Andi Copley
- Producer: Stan Brodsky
- Production companies: Betty Productions; Walt Disney Television

Original release
- Network: The Disney Channel
- Release: March 23, 1992 – 1993

Adventures in Wonderland is an American live-action/puppet musical television series based on the novels Alice's Adventures in Wonderland (1865) and Through the Looking-Glass (1871) by Lewis Carroll as well as the 1951 animated film. In the series, Alice (played by Elisabeth Harnois), is portrayed as a girl who can come and go from Wonderland simply by walking through her mirror (a reference to Through the Looking-Glass).

== Plot ==
Each episode begins with Alice facing different problems and consulting with her cat Dinah. In order to find the answer she needs to get through a situation, she goes through her mirror that takes her to Wonderland where she partakes in surreal adventures with its inhabitants that revolve around the situation that she is dealing with at home. Every episode features singing and dancing.

== Characters ==
=== Main ===
- Alice (portrayed by Elisabeth Harnois) is the show's protagonist. Alice is an average preteen, often facing problems in school, with her younger brother Brian, older sister Kathy, friends Kim, Lisa, and Jennifer, or some other issue. She often confides in her cat Dinah about her day. Alice has a special gift in that she is able to pass into Wonderland by walking through her mirror. Whenever she arrives, she helps her friends solve their problems, which, in turn, offers a solution to hers back in her world.
- The Red Queen (portrayed by Armelia McQueen) is the ruler of Wonderland. The Red Queen, or Queen of Hearts, is Wonderland's sole monarch (she is a combination of The Queen of Hearts from Carroll's original book and the Red Queen from Through the Looking-Glass). She is strict but fair, often citing her mother and grandmother's example in her ruling, but is occasionally a source for trouble, usually due to her selfish attitude. As queen, she expects to get whatever she wants right away, and often pouts when things go wrong – often to the point where she says "Oh, harumph!" She usually ends up eating crow by the end of the episode, but sometimes, she offers solutions to problems other Wonderland residents face. Deep down, she cares greatly for her subjects (especially the White Rabbit), throwing them parties and celebrating their accomplishments. Unlike other adaptations of both the Queen of Hearts, and Red Queen, she is more of a protagonist instead of an antagonist.
  - Keeira Lyn Ford as Little Red Queen
- The White Rabbit (portrayed by Patrick Richwood) is the queen's chief lackey. The White Rabbit is the Queen's personal chef, servant, butler, event planner, shopping assistant, and every other job that she can think of at the time. He wears inline skates to get around, and occasionally loses control-with humorous results. He is also exceptionally timid, unable to stand up to the Queen when he is being treated unjustly. Rabbit is good friends with the other citizens of Wonderland, and he is often a notable accomplice in their schemes, given his proximity to Her Majesty. Though he occasionally complains, the White Rabbit is actually the Queen's closest confidant, and he often sympathizes with her.
- The Mad Hatter (portrayed by John Robert Hoffman) lives in a house shaped like a hat and is usually seen at his perpetually set tea table. He tends to be rather careless with his dishes and cups. The Mad Hatter is Wonderland's chief inventor, often devising crazy machines and potions to get himself and the gang out of trouble. However, the devices tend to get them into further trouble. He also has an affinity for disguises, such as fake beards and nose/eyeglasses. His catchphrase is "How true that is."
- The March Hare (portrayed by Reece Holland) can be intelligent at times, and he often assists his best friend the Mad Hatter in inventing and scheming. The Hare tends to lack common sense and is easily duped by others. The March Hare also usually serves the role of conscience among his friends; when a poor choice of judgment is reached, he is usually the one who questions the decision the most.
- Tweedle Dum and Tweedle Dee (portrayed by Robert Barry Fleming and Harry Waters Jr.) are a pair of rapping fraternal twins. The Tweedles wear bright, colorful clothing. As brothers, they share a strong sibling rivalry, often competing with each other about nearly everything. They are the most athletic residents of Wonderland, often playing sports and organizing games. Their brotherly love usually triumphs over problems, and they usually offer Alice some sensible advice on any problems she may have.
- The Caterpillar (performed by Wesley Mann) is a large caterpillar and Wonderland's wisest resident. When the Caterpillar speaks, he draws out his vowels in a long, deep voice. As a bug, he has three pairs of hands, which he often uses in tandem to complete tasks. The Caterpillar has a book of wondrous stories, similar to fables in their animal characters and simple morals. The characters often visit the Caterpillar in his mushroom glen to seek advice, which comes in the form of a story. Occasionally, he leaves his patch to visit other Wonderland areas. The Caterpillar's stories were animated by Will Vinton Productions.
- The Cheshire Cat (performed by Richard Kuhlman) is a purple-striped cat with a wide ever-present grin. He has the power to disappear and reappear at will. The Cat loves to play all manner of practical jokes on the Wonderlanders, but even he occasionally performs some act of kindness.
- The Dormouse (performed by John Lovelady) is a tiny rodent. The Dormouse lives in a teapot on the Hatter's tea table. Despite his small size, he apparently has all the necessities of life inside his home, including a kitchen sink and a painting gallery.

=== Supporting ===
- The Duchess (portrayed by Teri Garr) is the Red Queen's chief rival (a combination of the Duchess from Carroll's original book and the White Queen from Through the Looking-Glass) and, in a strange way, good friend. The Duchess and the Queen constantly quest to upstage each other, often trading insults along the way. Often refers to the Queen as "Twinkle Toes". Apparently, their rivalry began when they were still quite young. All of the Wonderlanders assume that the Queen and Duchess dislike each other, but deep down, the two admit that they have a special, if rocky, relationship.
  - Andreana Weiner as Little Girl Duchess
- The Walrus (portrayed by Ken Page) is a newcomer to Wonderland. When the Walrus first moved to Wonderland, he was the victim of prejudice, but soon gained friendships with all of the other citizens. The Walrus is quite smart-although he does have one rather strange oddity, in that his best friend Pinniped (credited as himself) is completely invisible. Though the Walrus seems different, he is accepted as just another member of the Wonderland gang.
- Although not really a living breathing character, Crystalvision (Crystal for short) is often seen around Wonderland in various places. Crystal's role in Wonderland is something like that of a television showing clips and prerecorded images for all the citizens of Wonderland to see. In some episodes, it was shown having a real personality by making joke via showing words on its screen and by the characters acknowledging it as a person.

=== Guest Star ===
- Christopher Anne Templeton as Hedda Hatter
- David Ruprecht as Bobby Shutterbug / Movie Interviewer
- Patrick Bristow as the Cavebunny
- Pat Sajak as himself
- Kim Christianson as Vanna White Rabbit / Nurse
- Willie Nelson as The Troubadour
- Gilbert Gottfried as Mike McNasty
- Stuart Pankin as Scalawag Jones
- Judge Reinhold as Dr. Busby
- Shadoe Stevens as Hat TV Host
- Marlee Matlin as April Hare
- Ed McMahon as Himself
- Sam Harris as Joe Belter
- Edie McClurg as The Eye Doctor
- O. J. Simpson as Himself
- Mike Regan as Rabbit DeNiro Double
- George McGrath as Stuffy Waiter

== Production ==
The series originally ran from March 23, 1992 to 1995 (with reruns continuing until at least 1998) on The Disney Channel and on stations across the country. Adventures in Wonderland was originally taped at Disney-MGM Studios at the Walt Disney World Resort in Bay Lake, Florida, with two sound stages used exclusively for the show, for its first 40 episodes. Afterward, shooting was moved to Los Angeles, California.

The Cheshire Cat and Dormouse puppets were created by Chiodo Bros. Inc.

== Episodes ==
=== Season 1 ===
No. overall	No. in season	Title	Directed by	Written by	Original release date
1	1	"Herstory in the Making"	David Grossman	Daryl Busby and Tom J. Astle	March 23, 1992
Alice lacks the confidence to write a story for a school assignment, so she enlists the help of her friends in Wonderland. Thinking that she's gotten them to do her homework for her, she quickly discovers that, when other people do your work, it doesn't always turn out the way you'd like.
2	2	"Lip-Sunk"	David Grossman	Daryl Busby and Tom J. Astle	March 24, 1992
The Queen is slated to give a speech at a royalty convention when she suddenly loses her voice. While the Wonderland characters literally scramble to look for her lost voice, Alice tries to convince them that it's just an idiom and there's no need to search.
3	3	"Red Queen for a Day"	David Grossman	Daryl Busby and Daniel Benton	March 25, 1992
When Alice becomes Queen for a day, her royal decisions alienate her Wonderland friends, and she learns that being in charge also carries responsibility.
4	4	"Objects d'Heart"	David Grossman	Daryl Busby and Tom J. Astle	TBA
The Queen decides to take up sculpture as a hobby. Thinking that everyone loves her creations, she gives them away as gifts. In the end, though, the work ends up in a pile of quicksand, and the Wonderland gang decides to say what they mean from that point on.
5	5	"Arrivederci Aroma"	David Grossman	Daryl Busby, Tom J. Astle, and Susan Amerikaner	TBA
The Queen orders perfume from The Royal Catalog at the same time the Hatter orders spray paint, but there is a mix-up of parcels. Alice and her friends learn a lesson about the value of reading directions.
6	6	"The Bunny Flop"	David Grossman	Daryl Busby and Susan Amerikaner	TBA
The Queen and the White Rabbit appear on "Lifestyles of the Royal and Famous", but the live interview goes awry when the Rabbit, who was awake all night, has trouble keeping his eyes open and his mouth shut. Note: The White Rabbit starts wearing a bowtie as of this episode.
7	7	"Pop Goes the Easel"	David Grossman	Daryl Busby and Deborah Raznick	TBA
On the day the Queen's official portrait is to be unveiled, the White Rabbit trips and puts his head through the canvas. All in Wonderland attempt to restore the painting. Note: This episode was released on the "Helping Hands" VHS.
8	8	"Through the Looking Glasses"	David Grossman	Daryl Busby and Susan Amerikaner	TBA
The Cheshire Cat gives Rabbit a pair of rose-colored glasses and convinces him that they magically make everything beautiful. Eventually, everyone (but the Queen) realizes that the glasses were a hoax. They learn that it's not how they look at things, but how they think about them that counts.
9	9	"That's All, Jokes!"	Gary Halvorson	Daryl Busby, Tom J. Astle, and Daniel Benton	TBA
A practical-joke marathon sweeps through Wonderland, and soon everyone is obsessed with getting even. The potpourri of pranks finally stops when the Queen falls victim to a trick. As a result, Alice learns that, by "getting even", a person sometimes gets more than they expected.
10	10	"Forget Me Knot"	Gary Halvorson	Daryl Busby and Susan Amerikaner	TBA
The Queen goes to "Professor Memory" to improve her memory, while the Rabbit goes all over Wonderland in search of the book in which he put the Queen's theater tickets. Rabbit, Alice, and the Queen learn some new memory skills.
11	11	"Boo, Who?"	Gary Halvorson	Daryl Busby and Tom J. Astle	TBA
The Queen thinks the palace is haunted when she spies a ghost wandering the halls. It appears the famished phantom is gobbling up the jellybeans meant for the Royal Jellybean Counting Contest. The Queen orders the Rabbit to stand guard, but actually there is merely a sleepwalking White Rabbit.
12	12	"Double Your Bunny"	Gary Halvorson	Daryl Busby and Tom J. Astle	TBA
The White Rabbit's identical cousin comes to Wonderland to look at vacation property. But Rabbit is unable to meet his cousin's train, forcing this White Rabbit look-alike to wander Wonderland alone. Confusion and crabbiness abound when Wonderland's residents don't realize there's a new bunny on the block.
13	13	"Diary of a Mad Hatter"	Gary Halvorson	Daryl Busby, Tom J. Astle, and M.C. Varley	TBA
The Mad Hatter finds his great-grandhatter's diary, which contains clues to a hidden treasure. The ensuing treasure hunt leads Wonderland's residents on a merry chase, but eventually the treasure is found. To everyone's surprise, the treasure is a collection of hats. Note: This episode is also entitled “Keep It Under Your Hat”.
14	14	"How the West Was Wonderland"	Gary Halvorson	Daryl Busby, Tom J. Astle, and Deborah Raznick	TBA
A rodeo is coming to Wonderland, and the Queen resolves to be "Queen of the Rodeo", except she is required a ride a horse, which scares her. Her pride keeps her from admitting her fear, but Alice and the White Rabbit figure out her problem and provide her with a way to save face.
15	15	"The Rules of the Game"	Gary Halvorson	Daryl Busby and M.C. Varley	TBA
Alice gets a lesson in playing by the rules after several frustrating rounds of Meewalk, a game in which the rules can be changed at any moment. The final straw comes when the Queen changes the rules after the game is over so that she, instead of the Tweedles, is declared the winner.
16	16	"Something to Sneeze At"	Gary Halvorson	Daryl Busby and Susan Amerikaner	TBA
The Mad Hatter suddenly becomes allergic to his best friend, the March Hare. But the March Hare is determined not to allow the Hatter's sneeze to put the freeze on their friendship.
17	17	"Off the Cuffs"	Gary Halvorson	Daryl Busby, Tom J. Astle, and Phil Baron	TBA
The March Hare's magic act goes awry when his "Magic Handcuffs" fail to open. First the Queen, then half of Wonderland, get "tied up", until the Hare finds the missing key. Note: This episode was released on the "Hare-Raising Magic" VHS.
18	18	"Tooth or Consequences"	Gary Halvorson	Daryl Busby, Tom J. Astle, and Susan Amerikaner	TBA
The White Rabbit has a toothache that just won't quit, but his fear of going to the dentist causes him to procrastinate.
19	19	"The Wonderland Enquirer"	Gary Halvorson	Daryl Busby and Tom J. Astle	TBA
The Queen, annoyed with dull stories in the Wonderland daily paper, orders the editors (Tweedle Dum and Tweedle Dee) to print every juicy rumor they hear, whether the stories can be verified or not. The Queen loves the newspaper, until she becomes a victim of the rumor mill herself.
20	20	"The Hatter Who Came to Dinner"	TBA	TBA	TBA
When the Mad Hatter's back is thrown out in the line of duty, the Queen and the White Rabbit feel obliged to put him up until he's better. The Hatter proceeds to take advantage of "the royal treatment", until they find out he's faking and call his bluff.
21	21	"The Mirth of a Nation"	TBA	TBA	TBA
While attending her "Mirthday" party, the Queen bumps her funny bone and loses her sense of humor. When she subsequently decides to ban all laughter from Wonderland, her subjects get serious and plot to restore mirth to Her Majesty. Note: Reece Holland is absent as the March Hare in this episode.
22	22	"For Better or Verse"	TBA	TBA	TBA
Rabbit gets rhymitis and is banned by the Queen until he gets rid of it. The irritating condition is passed all around Wonderland, until it hits the Queen, right when she needs the rhyming disease in order to beat the Duchess in a contest. Note: This episode was released on the "Hare-Raising Magic" VHS.
23	23	"TechnoBunny"	TBA	TBA	TBA
With the White Rabbit on vacation, the Queen gets a temporary robot replacement to do his work. The robot is so efficient that it looks as if the White Rabbit may be out of work permanently, until the Queen's failure to follow directions causes a surprising malfunction. Note: This episode was released on the "Helping Hands" VHS.
24	24	"Party-Pooped"	TBA	TBA	TBA
The Mad Hatter is annoyed with the March Hare's chronic tardiness to the tea party. The resulting quarrel splits up the friends, and, in a fit of pique, the Hare throws his own party at exactly the Hatter's teatime. When Wonderland's residents find this two-party system too tiring (and too filling), they resolve to get the Hatter and the Hare back together.
25	25	"Up and Anthem"	TBA	TBA	TBA
When the Wonderland national anthem is deemed unsingable, the Queen decrees an anthem-writing contest to choose a new one. The White Rabbit, who authored the original anthem refuses to write a new anthem. But the competition makes him realize that his song could stand a little improvement, so he decides to "change his tune".
26	26	"Pretzelmania"	TBA	TBA	TBA
It appears that the Rabbit has dropped the Queen's diamond ring into the Hatter's new pretzel machine, thereby baking it into one of the 100 pretzels. The Rabbit's friends pig out on pretzels, hoping to find the ring before the Queen finds out about the whole silly mishap. Note: This episode was released on the "Missing Ring Mystery" VHS.
27	27	"White Elephant Sale"	TBA	TBA	TBA
At a royal garage sale, the Queen unloads a (real) white elephant. In the hands of its new owners, however, the useless item is recycled into a whirlpool bath, a barbecue, and, finally, a prized art deco lamp sought after by none other than the Queen.
28	28	"Rip-Roaring Rabbit Tales/Rabbit Without a Cause"	TBA	TBA	TBA
The White Rabbit, who has become convinced his life lacks excitement, imagines himself in a series of storybook adventures. But, when he narrowly averts disaster with the Queen's flower-vase collection, he decides that sometimes it's best when excitement is only found in the pages of a book.
29	29	"Happy Boo Boo Day"	TBA	TBA	TBA
The Queen tells the Rabbit she doesn't want a birthday party this year, because her subjects always manage to goof it up. Despite the Queen's wishes, Rabbit sets into motion plans for a surprise party, to prove that they can throw a successful party. Of course, the party gets goofed-up big time, but the Queen learns that "it's the thought that counts".
30	30	"What Makes Rabbit Run"	TBA	TBA	TBA
To prove how popular she is, the Queen decides to run for office in a Wonderland-wide election. She orders the reluctant White Rabbit to be her opponent, assuming it will just be for appearances, but the Rabbit's popularity grows, and the Queen is forced to rethink her way of ruling Wonderland.
31	31	"Friday the Umpteenth"	TBA	TBA	TBA
When Alice tells the Hatter and Hare about the superstition that Friday the 13th is bad luck, she unknowingly sets off a Wonderland panic. Fear of bad luck keeps Wonderland's residents from enjoying themselves, until they realize that good luck is sometimes a matter of perspective.
32	32	"Pizza De Resistance"	TBA	TBA	TBA
Disgusted with the quality of take-out pizza in Wonderland, the Queen dubs the White Rabbit "Royal Pizza Chef". He doesn't want the job, so he convinces the Queen to hold a contest instead and choose the Royal Pizza Chef from the entrants. Everyone's happy to participate-but in the end, the best pizza is made by none other than the Queen herself.
33	33	"A Litter Help From My Friends"	TBA	TBA	TBA
When keeping Wonderland litter-free becomes a bigger job than one bunny can handle, the White Rabbit enlists the help of all of Wonderland's residents. The blustery weather seems for a moment to be helpful in blowing away trash-until all the loose litter lands right in the middle of the Wonderland picnic site.
34	34	"Busy as a Spelling Bee"	TBA	TBA	TBA
The Queen is appalled at the bad spelling in thank-you notes from her subjects. When Alice explains that her school holds spelling bees every year as a way to help children improve their spelling, the Queen decides it is time to schedule Wonderland's first spelling bee. Her homonym word choices, though, ensure that everyone loses-but Alice and her friends discover that everyone losing can be more fun than one person winning.
35	35	"Hic-Hic Hooray"	TBA	TBA	TBA
After volunteering to transport boxes of the Queen's fragile new dinnerware, Tweedle Dum develops a severe and tremulous case of the hiccups. En route back to the palace, he solicits a wide and weird variety of Wonderland cures.
36	36	"He's Not Heavy, He's My Hatter"	TBA	TBA	TBA
After indulging in too many of his grandmother's cookies, the Mad Hatter is forced to go on a diet and exercise program. He tells the Hare to hide the offending cookies. When his resolve weakens, and he tries to find them again, Hatter unknowingly burns up the calories as he searches all over Wonderland for the hidden cookies.
37	37	"Invasion of the Tweedle Snatchers"	TBA	TBA	TBA
When the Cheshire Cat commandeers a remote-controlled toy flying saucer, the Mad Hatter and the March Hare think that Wonderland is being invaded from outer space. The Hatter and Hare manage to get most of Wonderland in a panic, until finally, everyone discovers that there are no little green space invaders, just a big, purple, mischievous cat.
38	38	"Bubble Trouble"	TBA	TBA	TBA
The Queen cuts costs at the palace by canceling the bottled water delivery and tapping Wonderland's own underground spring. Armed with a book from the Caterpillar, the White Rabbit, newly appointed water monitor, keeps the Wonderland residents from polluting the spring. But eventually, the Queen ignores her own example and pollutes the spring herself, learning a lesson about practicing what you preach.
39	39	"The Bunny Who Would Be King"	TBA	TBA	TBA
Movie star Rabbit DeNiro is coming to Wonderland to see his brother, the White Rabbit, whom he thinks is the King. The White Rabbit's friends help him ascend to the throne, and the charade seems to work, until the Queen returns.
40	40	"Welcome Back Hatter"	TBA	TBA	TBA
The Hatter wins what appears to be a huge castle via a mail-order sweepstakes and prepares to move out of Wonderland. The Hare is sad that his best friend is leaving but decides to hide his true feelings to avoid upsetting the Hatter.

=== Season 2 ===
No. overall	No. in season	Title	Directed by	Written by	Original release date
41	1	"Noses Off"	TBA	TBA	TBA
While trying to help Her Majesty come up with an original costume for an upcoming masquerade ball, the Hatter and Hare accidentally attach a ridiculous rubber nose to the Queen's face, then can't get it off. The Queen and Alice uses sneezing powder and bouquet of flowers to remove her predicament and The White Rabbit will go get The Tweedles to showing the reporter for the cover of "Palace Beautiful" magazine around. Note: This episode was released on the "Missing Ring Mystery" VHS. Richard Kuhlman, the voice of The Cheshire Cat, is seen on screen as the reporter, Dirk Deadline. This episode also marks a permanent outfit change for Tweedles.
42	2	"This Bunny for Hire"	TBA	TBA	TBA
The White Rabbit breaks one of the Queen's vases, which he assumes is valuable crystal. Rather than tell the Queen what happened, he works nonstop, moonlighting to make enough money to buy a replacement-only to discover, too late, that the original vase was merely inexpensive glass.
43	3	"All That Glitters/Forbidden Fruit"	TBA	TBA	TBA
Tweedle Dum ignores Caterpillar's warnings and eats a dangerous new fruit that can make him stronger but may also make him very sick. A bellyache results, and Tweedle Dum learns to heed future warnings.
44	4	"Whose Carrots Are They, Anyway?"	TBA	TBA	TBA
The Rabbit is proud of his carrot crop and would like to invite his friends from Wonderland to a simple carrot-tasting party. However, many of the Rabbit's friends proceed to turn his simple party into the biggest, glitziest event of the season.
45	5	"Say It Again, Ma'am!"	TBA	TBA	TBA
The Rabbit misunderstands a royal edict but is too intimidated by the Queen to ask her to repeat herself. He enlists help from Wonderland's other residents to deduce what the Queen meant but comes to a conclusion that only adds to the confusion.
46	6	"Lady and the Camp"	TBA	TBA	TBA
The White Rabbit buys flowers for the Queen, only to find out that the blossoms are full of bugs. While the Hatter and the Hare de-bug the palace, the Queen camps out in the woods for the night and discovers that it's too tough to rough it when you're used to the soft life.
47	7	"Gowns and Roses"	TBA	TBA	TBA
The Red Queen hears there is money to be made by putting her name on a clothing label, so she designs her own fashion line. When the model fails to arrive for the fashion show, the Queen is shocked to see Rabbit on the runway.
48	8	"Dinner Fit for a Queen"	TBA	TBA	TBA
When the Tweedles submit a tape to "Wonderland's Silliest Home Videos", the Red Queen's dignity is destroyed. She attempts to reclaim it with a staged dinner party for "Royalty's Favorite Home Videos".
49	9	"Toot-Toot-Tootsies, Goodbye"	TBA	TBA	TBA
Cheshire Cat hoaxes the existence of the legendary monster "Big Tootsies", fooling everybody but the Red Queen.
50	10	"The Red Queen Crown Affair"	TBA	TBA	TBA
When the Red Queen's crown disappears, the Mad Hatter and the March Hare set out as private investigators to find it…which they do, underneath the Mad Hatter's own hat.
51	11	"Copy-Catter Hatter"	TBA	TBA	TBA
The Mad Hatter's reputation is at stake after his royal hat designs are copied by the rascally Copy-Catter Hatter. The Mad Hatter foils his plagiarizing cousin by leaving out a design that the Red Queen is sure to dislike.
52	12	"Queen of the Beasts/The Greatest Story Never Sold"	TBA	TBA	TBA
When the Red Queen decides her life lacks excitement, she becomes a wild wobear tamer. The Wonderland inhabitants are impressed, until they discover that the ferocious wild animal is a cute, cuddly wobear cub.
53	13	"Vanity Hare"	TBA	TBA	TBA
When the March Hare inadvertently helps the Queen solve her crossword puzzle, she bestows upon him the Smarty Pants Medal. Soon, the Hare gets too high an opinion of his own intelligence, until he finds out that being a smarty pants sometimes means being too big for your boots.
54	14	"The Best Ears of Our Lives"	TBA	TBA	TBA
When White Rabbit tires of being ignored, he tries to get attention by yelling and then by being silent. However, he discovers that the best way to make people curious about what you have to say is simply to speak softly.
55	15	"Fiesta Time"	TBA	TBA	TBA
When the Red Queen is invited to King Ricardo's Fiesta, she balks because she can't speak Spanish. The others put together a Wonderland Fiesta to teach Spanish to the Red Queen.
56	16	"Hair'em Scare'em/The Girl With Green Hair"	TBA	TBA	TBA
After the Mad Hatter send a bottle of his new shampoo to the Red Queen, he discovers that the shampoo has turned Alice's hair green. The March Hare tries to retrieve the shampoo before the Red Queen uses it, while the Mad Hatter tries to restore Alice's true hair color.
57	17	"A Change of Heart"	TBA	TBA	TBA
It's Valentine's Day, and Alice is dismayed to discover the Red Queen has ordered her subjects to show their affection. Since this is her first time celebrating in Wonderland, she decides to show the Queen the true meaning of the holiday.
58	18	"On a Roll"	Unknown	Unknown	September 3, 1992
The Mad Hatter prepares for a visit from his cousin Hedda Hatter, who uses a wheelchair. When she writes that the only drawback is "stairs," the Wonderland gang thinks she means "stares," so no one will look at poor Hedda. Once the confusion is cleared up, Hedda teaches everyone that people in wheelchairs can do the same things as anyone else. Special guest appearance by Christopher Anne Templeton as Hedda Hatter.
59	19	"The Grape Juice of Wrath"	TBA	TBA	TBA
The White Rabbit spills grape juice on the Queen's throne and enlists Wonderland's other residents to help him remove the spot before the Queen returns from a day of picking blueberries. Their efforts are unsuccessful, to put it mildly. Finally, Rabbit tries to admit his mistake to the Queen, only to find that she doesn't care, since she had planned to get the throne reupholstered anyway.
60	20	"Homing Pigeons"	TBA	TBA	TBA
After losing his house key for the umpteenth time, Hatter invents a house key homing device. Hoping to cash in on his invention, he stages a demonstration. He collects everyone's house key on a key ring, and then has Alice hide it. Before Hatter can track it down, the Cheshire Cat finds it, fancies it as a necklace, and disappears with it, leading all on a merry chase.
61	21	"From Hare to Eternity"	TBA	TBA	TBA
When the Red Queen saves the March Hare from quicksand, the March Hare carries out an annoying vow to protect her from all danger, until the Red Queen tricks the March Hare into "saving" her.
62	22	"Chalice in Wonderland"	TBA	TBA	TBA
Hatter and Hare go on an archaeological dig and uncover a beautiful, ancient chalice. Rabbit intercepts the treasure on behalf of the Queen, only to discover a curse written on the bottom of the cup. The Chalice exchanges hands, as one coincidental accident after another occurs…until, finally, the curse is revealed to be not a curse at all.
63	23	"Hippity Hoppity Hypnotist"	TBA	TBA	TBA
The March Hare accidentally hypnotizes the Red Queen into acting like a chicken when the word "red" is spoken. The White Rabbit isn't aware of this, until the Red Queen is about to go on Wonderland TV.
64	24	"Christmas in Wonderland"	TBA	TBA	TBA
Christmas is nearly ruined when the Red Queen hears about Alice's "white" Christmas and decides she won't be happy until she gets her own snowfall-which is impossible, as it never snows in Wonderland. It turns out that her happiest Christmas memories stemmed from the one holiday when she and her parents vacationed in a snowy cabin. Moved, the Wonderland gang tries to bring the Queen snow. It does not work, of course, but the Queen learns that the real meaning of Christmas is the joy of people being kind to each other. As soon as this lesson is learned, Wonderland's first-ever snowfall begins.
65	25	"The Day of the Iguana"	TBA	TBA	TBA
When the Red Queen banishes a fortune teller from the palace, the White Rabbit fears a retaliatory curse has turned Her Majesty into an iguana. However, the iguana is actually Chuck, one of the fortune teller's critters.

=== Season 3 ===
No. overall	No. in season	Title	Directed by	Written by	Original release date
66	1	"I Am the Walrus"	TBA	TBA	TBA
News of a walrus is moving panics Wonderland, because they heard that walruses are rude, smelly, and liars. When they can't get the Queen to tell the Walrus to leave, they decide to exclude and ignore him. Alice is the first to meet the Walrus and learns the rumors are completely false. When her friends refuse to believe and leave the Queen's party to not associate with him, the Queen treats them the same way and teaches them that it is wrong to exclude someone without getting to know them first. In the end, the residents of Wonderland, except for the Queen, all collectively decide to stop being racist. Guest starring Ken Page as Walrus
67	2	"Weed Shall Overcome"	TBA	TBA	TBA
The Red Queen's plans for a new royal tennis court are delayed when the Walrus discovers a rare plant growing on the site. Wonderland's residents band together to convince the reluctant Queen to save the poor plant from extinction. Their words fail to move her, until the Walrus reveals that the weed is actually a crucial part in a biological chain that protects the Queen's roses. Guest starring Ken Page as Walrus
68	3	"Deface in the Crowd"	TBA	TBA	TBA
All of Wonderland's residents are alarmed when a mysterious vandal begins defacing every available surface with graffiti. Attempts to catch the vandal fail, but, finally, he turns himself in when he realizes his attention-getting ploy is actually costing him dearly in lost friendships. Guest starring Ken Page as Walrus
69	4	"TV or Not TV?"	TBA	TBA	TBA
Prospects for good attendance at the annual Wonderland spring picnic look bad when the Mad Hatter, the March Hare, Tweedle Dum, and Tweedle Dee all begin watching television. They seem in danger of becoming true couch potatoes, until a cautionary nightmare jolts them off the sofa.
70	5	"The Days of Vine and Roses"	TBA	TBA	TBA
The Red Queen's chances for having her palace make the cover of "Better Palaces and Gardens" magazine are jeopardized when some of Wonderland's residents fail to follow the care instructions for an exotic plant. Soon the palace is completely overgrown by a massive tangle of vines. Special guest appearance by David Ruprecht as Bobby Shutterbug
71	6	"The Clan of the Cavebunny"	TBA	TBA	TBA
A simple spelunking expedition turns up the discovery of the year: a bunny frozen in a block of ice, apparently to be a prehistoric cavebunny. All of Wonderland will soon find out, because it suddenly comes to life. Special guest appearance by Patrick Bristow as the Cavebunny
72	7	"Metaphor Monday"	TBA	TBA	TBA
As all of Wonderland celebrates Metaphor Monday by preparing for the Metaphor Ball, a grand event in which everyone comes dressed as their favorite metaphor, the Tweedles become so consumed by sibling rivalry that they nearly let their inter-Tweedle competition ruin both of their chances to win the metaphor costume contest.
73	8	"Game Shows People Play"	TBA	TBA	TBA
After the Duchess ridicules the Red Queen's use of adverbs, the Queen goes on the TV game show "Name That Adverb". She does fine, until she takes a bath in the bonus round. Special guest appearance by Pat Sajak as himself Guest starring Kim Christianson as Vanna White Rabbit
74	9	"The Adventures of Spectacular Man"	TBA	TBA	TBA
When a falling star gives the Mad Hatter superpowers, he takes to the air as Spectacular Man, protector of Wonderland. The Red Queen is jealous of her new media rival, until he travels north by northwest to save her at the dedication of Mt. Wonderland.
75	10	"For Hare Eyes Only"	TBA	TBA	TBA
When the Mad Hatter gets caught peeking at the March Hare's mail, Hare sets a trap by asking Hatter to pick up a tempting-to-open, but booby-trapped box. Two packages arrive, and Mad Hatter succumbs to temptation and opens one-but not the rigged parcel. Even so, the package turns out to be just as good at teaching Hatter a lesson about respecting people's private property.
76	11	"To Tear Is Human"	TBA	TBA	TBA
When Alice rips her pants during a game of charades, the others kid her good-naturedly, then apologize when they realize that she doesn't see the humor in the situation. All tip-toe around the crabby girl, until an even sillier mishap teaches Alice that the only way to get over being embarrassed is not to take herself so seriously. Guest starring Ken Page as Walrus
77	12	"Odd Woman Out"	TBA	TBA	TBA
When Alice is prohibited from joining a Wonderland guys-only club called the Oddballs, she conspires with the Red Queen to fool the lodge brothers into changing their antiquated rules and admitting their first female member. Her manly disguise works, but Alice wants to be accepted as she is. The guys soon realize their mistake and vow to form a new club for everyone in Wonderland.
78	13	"Time Warped"	TBA	TBA	TBA
The Mad Hatter and the March Hare believe they have invented a real time machine and resolve to use the goofy gadget to "go back in time" to prevent the Red Queen from doing something they know "she'll later regret".
79	14	"Give Ants a Chance"	TBA	TBA	TBA
Due to his extreme fear of ants, the Walrus seems destined to go through life avoiding picnics. Wonderland's other residents attempt to help him overcome his fear, but he finally realizes that, if he doesn't want to lose out, he'll have to decide on his own to stop letting ants bug him. Guest starring Ken Page as Walrus
80	15	"Card 54, Where Are You?"	TBA	TBA	TBA
The Red Queen becomes obsessed with collecting "Famous Bunnies of Filmland" trading cards, particularly when card 54 eludes her and ends up in the hands of the Mad Hatter.
81	16	"Your Cheatin' Red Heart"	TBA	TBA	TBA
The Red Queen, tired of losing every Boffo-Bingo tournament to her rival, the Duchess, gets desperate and cheats. Much to her surprise, her conscience kicks in, and she's unable to savor her victory. Special guest appearance by Teri Garr as The Duchess
82	17	"Wonderland: The Movie"	TBA	TBA	TBA
Wonderland's residents watch a documentary on the subject of friendship, featuring the rather rocky royal relationship between the Red Queen and the Duchess. Special guest appearance by Teri Garr as The Duchess
83	18	"Bunny, Can You Spare a Dime?"	TBA	TBA	TBA
When the Red Queen thinks her royal savings have bottomed out, she is forced to auction off some royal possessions, including the fabulous Hop Diamond. However, she outbids everyone at her own auction, forcing her to borrow money from her royal rival, the Duchess. Special guest appearance by Teri Garr as The Duchess
84	19	"The Royalty Trap"	TBA	TBA	TBA
On the day the Red Queen is to be feted by the Royalty Hall of Fame, she accidentally locks herself in the royal tool shed. The Duchess seizes her chance to "help" the Queen by standing in for her at the ceremony-in hopes of grabbing all the attention that was meant for Her Majesty. Special guest appearance by Teri Garr as The Duchess
85	20	"Just the Fax, Ma'am/Duchess Treat"	TBA	TBA	TBA
With the annual fund-raiser for the Wonderland library on deck, the Red Queen is intent on upstaging the Duchess in the fashion department and finally getting her picture on the society page. In her eagerness to get the fashion scoop, the Red Queen learns that sometimes the fax can be confusing. Special guest appearance by Teri Garr as The Duchess
86	21	"Take the Bunny and Run/Other People's Bunny"	TBA	TBA	TBA
The Red Queen learns just how nice it is to have a bunny around the house after recklessly losing White Rabbit in a bet to the Duchess. When she finds Rabbit is just as unhappy about the change of employers, the Queen makes plans to get the bunny back. Special guest appearance by Teri Garr as The Duchess
87	22	"Gratitude Adjustment"	TBA	TBA	TBA
The Red Queen cancels "Thanks-a-lot Day", a day dedicated to gratitude, because she doesn't see the point of the holiday. Wonderland's residents try to help her understand what it means to be thankful, but it takes a call from her mom to finally get the ungrateful Queen to realize that even royal folks need to say "thank you" sometimes.
88	23	"Pie Noon"	TBA	TBA	TBA
When the pie-throwing bully from the March Hare's high school day arrives at the Wonderland train station at high noon, the Hare panics, because none of his friends will stand with him against the bully. Special guest appearances by Willie Nelson as The Troubadour and Gilbert Gottfried as Mike McNasty
89	24	"Untwist of Fate"	TBA	TBA	TBA
The denizens of Wonderland are worried that Alice won't be able to play Juliet in Shakespaw's "Rabbit and Juliet" because she has come down with a bad case of "tongue twisters" and can only speak in silly phrases.
90	25	"Queen's Best Friend"	TBA	TBA	TBA
The Cheshire Cat plays a trick on the Red Queen and leads her to believe that the stray dog she found can talk and is named Charles Chumley Cogswell Jones III (Jonesy for short). The Queen, sure that a talking dog will bring her fame and fortune, books a spot on a TV program to showcase her talented terrier. To the Queen's chagrin, the previously garrulous dog is as quiet as a mouse once it's on the air.
91	26	"Purple Potato Eaters"	TBA	TBA	TBA
When Wonderland's residents get a whiff of a batch of purple potato pancakes the Walrus is eating, they want to try them. The complicated recipe, however, makes them reluctant to help make more batter. After the Cheshire Cat tricks them into helping prepare the pancakes in spite of themselves, they learn that working for something helps one to appreciate it. Guest starring Ken Page as Walrus
92	27	"The Queen Who Came in From the Cold"	TBA	TBA	TBA
The Red Queen, crabby about all the anonymous letters in the paper complaining about her rash of newly imposed taxes, dons a disguise and goes undercover as Lorraine Quiche to root out the letter writers. To her surprise, she ends up agreeing with the writers' gripes and must face the difficult task of admitting she is wrong.
93	28	"The Color of Wobucks"	TBA	TBA	TBA
When the White Rabbit gets bamboozled by a con man named Scalawag Jones into spending the Red Queen's money on a seed for a phony money tree, his friends try to help out by "planting" one of their own. When this scheme backfires, the Queen herself comes up with a plan to bamboozle the bamboozler. Special guest appearance by Stuart Pankin as Scalawag Jones Guest starring Ken Page as Walrus
94	29	"Take My Tonsils, Please"	TBA	TBA	TBA
The Mad Hatter has a sore throat. Because of his reluctance to seek treatment, the Dormouse takes the liberty in phone calling a doctor. Special guest appearances by Judge Reinhold as Dr. Busby and Shadoe Stevens as Hat TV Host Guest starring Kim Christianson as Nurse
95	30	"The Sound and The Furry"	TBA	TBA	TBA
After the crabby Red Queen orders an afternoon of silence, the March Hare's hearing-impaired cousin, April Hare, visits to teach everyone sign language. Miscommunication results in the Queen banishing the cousin from Wonderland and nearly turning a deaf ear to her own mistake. Special guest appearance by Marlee Matlin as April Hare
96	31	"Hats Off to the King"	TBA	TBA	TBA
After hearing the Mad Hatter perform a simple, down-to-earth song, the Tweedles arrange for him to compete on "Wonderland Star Hunt", where Ed McMahon hosts the Best Male Singer Contest. Alas, the Hatter succumbs to all things "flashy, glitzy, and showbizzy", and he makes a fool of himself on the show. Special guest appearance by Ed McMahon as Himself and Sam Harris as Joe Belter
97	32	"Those Tusks, Those Eyes"	TBA	TBA	TBA
The Walrus gets roped into performing his old precision creampuff-throwing act, with the Red Queen as his assistant. He has become very nearsighted, however, since he last did his act. At first his vanity keeps him from wearing glasses, but when it becomes clear that his choice is either to wear the glasses or make a spectacle of himself, and Her Majesty, he finally visits the eye doctor. Special guest appearance by Edie McClurg as The Eye Doctor Guest starring Ken Page as Walrus
98	33	"Bah, Hamburger"	TBA	TBA	TBA
In this parody of A Christmas Carol, Tweedle Dum learns about good eating habits and the consequences of his obsession with eating junk food, when he is visited by the spirits of Nutrition Past, Present, and Future (respectively played by the Hatter, the Queen, and the Rabbit).
99	34	"White Rabbits Can't Jump'"	N/A	N/A	Unaired
The White Rabbit gets some help from his hero O. J. Simpson when the residents of Wonderland hold an annual athletics competition and he's afraid he will lose. NOTE: This episode never aired due to the O. J. Simpson murder case.
100	35	"A Wonderland Howl-oween"	TBA	TBA	TBA
At the traditional nighttime Halloween picnic, the Wonderland residents try to outspook each other with scary stories.

== Home media ==
Buena Vista Home Video released three volumes of certain episodes on VHS in 1993.

=== Streaming ===
The series was made available for streaming on Disney+ on April 30, 2021.

== Awards ==
Daytime Emmy Awards

- 1992 – Outstanding Hairstyling – Richard Sabre and Tish Simpson (won)
- 1994 – Outstanding Makeup – Ron Wild and Karen Stephens (won)
- 1994 – Outstanding Writing in a Children's Series – Daryl Busby and Tom J. Astle (won) (tied with Sesame Street)
- 1995 – Outstanding Costume Design – Lois DeArmond (won)
- 1996 – Outstanding Makeup – Karen Stephens and Ron Wild (won)
- 1996 – Outstanding Directing in a Children's Series – Shelley Jensen, David Grossman and Gary Halvorson (won)

Preceded by Mickey Mouse Club	Disney Channel Original Series	Succeeded by Flash Forward
