= Harry Waters Jr. =

American actor and singer (born 1953)

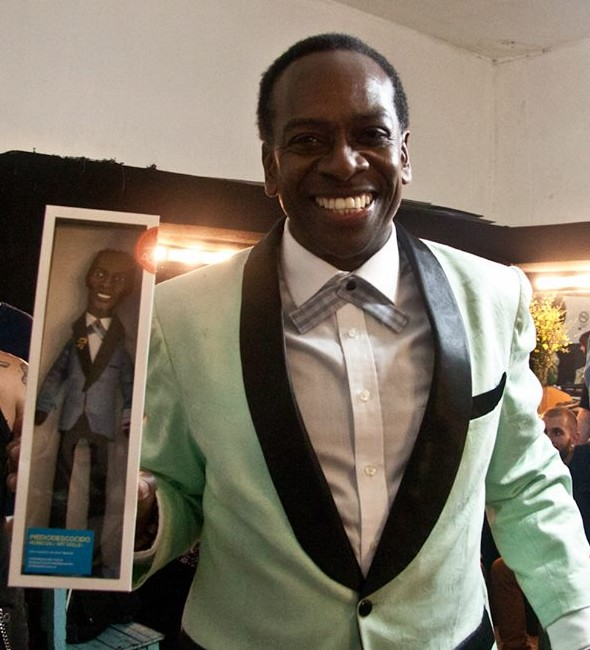
- Harry Waters Jr. in 2015, wearing the Marvin Berry costume and holding a doll of the character
- Born: Harry Tunney Waters Jr. April 13, 1953 (age 73); Tulsa, Oklahoma, U.S.
- Citizenship: United States
- Education: Princeton University, University of Wisconsin
- Occupations: Actor; singer; director; teacher

Harry Tunney Waters Jr. (born April 13, 1953) is an American actor, singer, and theatre director, best known for his portrayal of Marvin Berry in Back to the Future (1985) and Back to the Future Part II (1989). His renditions of "Night Train" and "Earth Angel" are two of the ten tracks on the gold record winning soundtrack album Back to the Future: Music from the Motion Picture Soundtrack. He created the role of Belize in the first production of Angels in America: A Gay Fantasia on National Themes in 1991.

== Career ==
Born in Tulsa, Oklahoma and growing up in Denver, Colorado, Waters attended Princeton University and received his MFA in Directing from the University of Wisconsin- Madison. He worked as an actor in New York City on and off Broadway for more than a decade as well as at theaters around the country. Venues include the Mark Taper Forum, Berkeley Repertory Theatre, TheatreWorks, and the San Jose Repertory Theatre.

He was a member of the Frank Silvera Writers Workshop in Harlem, which has developed the work of new, African American playwrights, directors, designers, and actors since 1973.

In 1985, he was cast as Marvin Berry (a fictional cousin of Chuck Berry) in Back to the Future, a role reprised in Back to the Future Part II in 1989.

In 1991, he created the role of Belize in the first production of Angels in America.

He was a cast member of the 1992 Disney show Adventures in Wonderland portraying Tweedle Dee, based on the Lewis Carroll novels Alice's Adventures in Wonderland and Through the Looking Glass.

He has worked in collaboration with novelist/playwright Jewelle Gomez on a play about James Baldwin, titled Waiting for Giovanni which was produced for the 2011-12 (San Francisco) New Conservatory Theater season. The project's development was sponsored by Intersection for the Arts.

Waters has taught acting, script development and has directed numerous productions around the country. He is currently a tenured professor in the Theatre Department at Macalester College. As he approaches retirement, he was appointed as the Associate Dean of the Kofi Annan Institute for Global Citizenship. Waters is an Honorary Member of Phi Beta Kappa, the nation's most Prestigious Academic Honor Society.

== Filmography ==
Production	Type	Year	Role	Notes
Hotline	TV movie	1982	Rick Hernandez	
Laverne & Shirley	TV Series	1983	Lamar	Season 8 Episode 16 Short on Time
Cagney & Lacey	TV Series	1983	Jimmy	Season 2 Episode 18 Chop Shop
Trapper John, M.D.	TV Series	1984–1985	Landis	Dark Side of the Loon S6 Ep9; Love Thy Neighbor S6 Ep14
Back to the Future	Movie	1985	Marvin Berry	
Matt Houston	TV Series	1985	Guard	Season 3 Episode 16 The Honeymoon Murders
News at Eleven	TV movie	1986	Stage Manager	
What a Country!	TV sitcom	1986–1987	Robert Muboto	
227	TV series	1986–1989	Policeman / Perrier / Richard	Play It Again, Stan S4 Ep11; Redecorating Blues S1 Ep18
The $25,000 Pyramid	TV series	1987	Himself	Celebrity Contestant in episodes that aired August 10, 1987 to August 14, 1987 & November 9, 1987 to November 13, 1987
What's Happening Now!!	TV sitcom	1988	Jerry	Happy Face S3 Ep17
Back to the Future Part II	Movie	1989	Marvin Berry	
Amen	TV series	1989	Director	The Psychic: Part 2 S3 Ep15
Faith	Movie	1990	Lester	
Death Warrant	Movie	1990	Jersey	
Adventures in Wonderland	TV series	1992–1994	Tweedle Dee	
Big Bully	Movie	1996	Alan	
Boys Life 2	Movie	1997	Tony's Date	(segment "Nunzio's Second Cousin")
Expedition: Back to the Future	TV series	2021	Marvin Berry	
