= Ain't Misbehavin' (musical) =

1978 musical revue

- Original cast recording
- Music: Fats Waller
- Lyrics: Various artists
- Book: Murray Horwitz; Richard Maltby Jr.
- Productions: 1978 New York cabaret 1978 Broadway; 1979 West End; 1982 US television 1988 Broadway revival 1992 European tour 1995 US National tour 1995 West End revival 2008 US National tour 2019 Offies
- Awards: Tony Award for Best Musical; Drama Desk Outstanding Musical

Ain't Misbehavin' is a musical revue with a book by Murray Horwitz and Richard Maltby Jr., and music by various composers and lyricists as arranged and orchestrated by Luther Henderson. It is named after the song by Fats Waller (with Harry Brooks and Andy Razaf), "Ain't Misbehavin'".

The musical is a tribute to the music of Waller (1904–1943), who composed in a time when Manhattan nightclubs such as the Cotton Club and the Savoy Ballroom were the playgrounds of high society and Lenox Avenue dives were filled with piano players banging out the new beat known as swing. Five performers present an evening of rowdy, raunchy, and humorous songs that encapsulate the various moods of the era and reflect Waller's view of life as a journey meant for pleasure and play.

== Productions ==
Ain't Misbehavin opened in the Manhattan Theatre Club's East 73rd Street cabaret on February 8, 1978. The cast included Irene Cara, Nell Carter, André DeShields, Armelia McQueen, and Ken Page. It was staged by Arthur Faria, now recognized as one of the original authors, stage-managed by David Rosenak, and directed by Maltby. The New York Times reviewer wrote: "The show moves with the zing and sparkle of a Waller recording—filled with bright melodies and asides." Buoyed by its reception, the producers decided to develop it into a full-scale production.

The musical opened on Broadway at the Longacre Theatre on May 9, 1978, and transferred to the Plymouth Theatre and then to the Belasco Theatre. Maltby was the director, with musical staging and choreography by Arthur Faria. The original cast featured Carter, DeShields, McQueen, Page, and Charlayne Woodard. Luther Henderson, who adapted Waller's music for the revue, appeared as the production's original pianist (Hank Jones is among the noted pianists who took over as onstage performer). Replacements later in the run included Debbie Allen, Yvette Freeman, Adriane Lenox, and Alan Weeks. An original cast recording was released by RCA Victor. The show closed on February 21, 1982, after 1,604 performances and 14 previews.

The London West End production opened on March 22, 1979, at Her Majesty's Theatre. DeShields and Woodard were joined by Evan Bell, Annie Joe Edwards, and Jozella Reed. It was revived in London in 1995 at the Tricycle Theatre and then the Lyric Theatre, with Debby Bishop, Dawn Hope, Melanie Marshall, Sean Palmer, and Ray Shell. A London revival cast recording was released by First Night.

On June 21, 1982, NBC broadcast the revue with the original Broadway cast.

A Broadway revival with the same director, choreographer, and cast as the original 1978 production opened on August 15, 1988, at the Ambassador Theatre, where it ran for 176 performances and eight previews. Frank Rich, in his review for The New York Times, wrote "In their scrupulous re-creation of the Fats Waller show that first electrified Broadway a decade ago, the original cast and creators have conjured the same between-the-wars dream world as before... Though almost bereft of dialogue, this musical anthology expands beyond its form to become a resurrection of a great black artist's soul. Perhaps the key to the musical's approach, as conceived by the director Richard Maltby Jr., is its willingness to let Waller speak simply and eloquently for himself, through his art but without show-biz embroidery."

In 1995, a national tour directed and choreographed by Faria starred the Pointer Sisters, Eugene Barry-Hill, and Michael-Leon Wooley. Although it never reached Broadway as originally planned, a recording of highlights from the show was released by RCA.

Season two American Idol contestants Frenchie Davis, Trenyce Cobbins and winner Ruben Studdard starred in the 30th-anniversary national tour of the show from November 13, 2008, to May 17, 2009.

== Song list ==
Act I

- "Ain't Misbehavin'"
- "Lookin' Good but Feelin' Bad"
- "Tain't Nobody's Biz-ness if I Do"
- "Honeysuckle Rose"
- "Squeeze Me"
- "Handful of Keys"
- "I've Got a Feeling I'm Falling"
- "How Ya Baby"
- "Jitterbug Waltz"
- "Ladies Who Sing with the Band"
- "Yacht Club Swing"
- "When the Nylons Bloom Again"
- "Cash for Your Trash"
- "Off-Time"
- "The Joint is Jumpin'"

Act II

- "Spreadin' Rhythm Around"
- "Lounging at the Waldorf"
- "The Viper's Drag"
- "Mean to Me"
- "Your Feet's Too Big"
- "That Ain't Right"
- "Keepin' Out of Mischief Now"
- "Find Out What They Like"
- "Fat and Greasy"
- "Black and Blue"
- "I'm Gonna Sit Right Down and Write Myself a Letter"
- "Two Sleepy People"
- "I've Got my Fingers Crossed"
- "I Can't Give You Anything but Love"
- "It's a Sin to Tell a Lie"
- "Honeysuckle Band"

== Awards and nominations ==
=== Original Broadway production ===
Year	Award ceremony	Category	Nominee	Result
1978	Tony Award	Best Musical		Won
1978	Tony Award	Best Performance by a Featured Actress in a Musical	Nell Carter	Won
1978	Tony Award	Best Performance by a Featured Actress in a Musical	Charlayne Woodard	Nominated
1978	Tony Award	Best Direction of a Musical	Richard Maltby, Jr.	Won
1978	Tony Award	Best Choreography	Arthur Faria	Nominated
1978	Drama Desk Award	Outstanding Musical		Won
1978	Drama Desk Award	Outstanding Actor in a Musical	Ken Page	Won
1978	Drama Desk Award	Outstanding Actor in a Musical	André DeShields	Nominated
1978	Drama Desk Award	Outstanding Actress in a Musical	Nell Carter	Won
1978	Drama Desk Award	Outstanding Actress in a Musical	Charlayne Woodard	Nominated
1978	Drama Desk Award	Outstanding Choreography	Arthur Faria	Nominated
1978	Theatre World Award	Outstanding Stage Performance	Nell Carter	Won
1978	Theatre World Award	Outstanding Stage Performance	Armelia McQueen	Won
1978	Outer Critics Circle Award	Best Musical		Won
1978	New York Drama Critics' Circle Award	Best Musical	Fats Waller and Richard Maltby, Jr.	Won
1979	Grammy Award	Best Musical Theater Album	Thomas Z. Shepard	Won

=== Original London production ===
Year	Award ceremony	Category	Nominee	Result
1979	Laurence Olivier Award	Musical of the Year		Nominated

=== 1982 NBC broadcast ===
Year	Award ceremony	Category	Nominee	Result
1982	Primetime Emmy Award	Outstanding Variety, Music or Comedy Series		Nominated
1982	Primetime Emmy Award	Individual Performance in a Variety or Music Program	Nell Carter	Won
1982	Primetime Emmy Award	Individual Performance in a Variety or Music Program	André DeShields	Won
1982	Primetime Emmy Award	Outstanding Choreography	Arthur Faria	Nominated
1982	Primetime Emmy Award	Outstanding Achievement in Music Direction		Nominated
1982	Primetime Emmy Award	Outstanding Sound Mixing for a Variety or Music Series or Special		Nominated
1982	Primetime Emmy Award	Outstanding Technical Direction, Camerawork, Video for a Miniseries, Movie or a Special		Nominated
1982	Primetime Emmy Award	Outstanding Video Tape Editing for a Limited Series or a Special		Nominated

=== 1988 Broadway revival ===
Year	Award ceremony	Category	Nominee	Result
1988	Tony Award	Best Revival of a Musical		Nominated

=== 30th anniversary revival tour ===
Year	Award ceremony	Category	Nominee	Result
2010	Grammy Award	Best Musical Theater Album		Nominated
