= The Wonderful World of Jonathan Winters =

Studio album by Jonathan Winters
- Released: 1960
- Genre: Comedy
- Label: Verve

Jonathan Winters chronology
The Wonderful World of Jonathan Winters (1960)	Down to Earth (1960)

The Wonderful World of Jonathan Winters is a 1960 comedy album, performed by Jonathan Winters.

The Wonderful World of Jonathan Winters was also the name of a television special in 1970.

With an unprecedented frenetic energy, Winters made obscure references to his mental illness and hospitalization during his stand-up comedy routines, most famously during the "flying saucer" bit. Winters casually mentions that if he wasn't careful, the authorities might put him back in the "zoo", referring to the institution.

== Track listing ==
1. Introduction - Flying Saucer
2. Western
3. Football Game
4. Airline Pilots
5. Used Pet Shop
6. Hip Robin Hood
7. Super Service Station
8. Marine Corps

== Personnel ==
- Jonathan Winters
