= Darren McGavin on stage and screen =

The filmography of American actor Darren McGavin includes over 180 credits in both film and television. In addition to his screen career, McGavin was also a stage actor, and appeared in eight Broadway productions between 1954 and 1967.

== Filmography ==
=== Film ===
Year	Title	Role	Notes	Ref.
1945	A Song to Remember	Student	Uncredited	
1945	Counter-Attack	Paratrooper	Uncredited	
1945	Kiss and Tell	Tech Sergeant	Uncredited	
1945	She Wouldn't Say Yes	The Kid, Soldier In Hospital	Uncredited	
1946	Fear	Blonde Student		
1949	I Remember You	Blind Mechanic	Short film	
1951	Queen for a Day	Dan		
1951	Distant Drums	Navy Lieutenant	Uncredited	
1955	Summertime	Eddie Yaeger		
1955	A Word to the Wives...	George Peters	Short film	
1955	The Man with the Golden Arm	Louie		
1955	The Court-Martial of Billy Mitchell	Captain Russ Peters		
1957	The Delicate Delinquent	Mike Damon		
1957	Beau James	Charley Hand		
1958	The Case Against Brooklyn	Pete Harris		
1964	Bullet for a Badman	Sam Ward		
1965	The Great Sioux Massacre	Captain Benton		
1965	African Gold	Mike Gregory		
1968	Mission Mars	Colonel Mike Blaiswick		
1971	Mrs. Pollifax-Spy	Farrell		
1972	43: The Richard Petty Story	Lee Petty		
1973	Happy Mother's Day, Love George	George Perry	Uncredited; Also director and producer	
1974	Hay que matar a B.	Pal Kovak		
1976	No Deposit, No Return	Duke		
1977	Airport '77	Stan Buchek		
1978	Zero to Sixty	Michael Nolan		
1978	Hot Lead and Cold Feet	Mayor Ragsdale		
1980	Hangar 18	Harry Forbes		
1981	Firebird 2015 AD	'Red'		
1983	A Christmas Story	Mr. Parker, The Old Man		
1984	The Natural	Gus Sands	Uncredited	
1985	Turk 182	Detective Kowalski		
1986	Raw Deal	FBI Agent Harry Shannon		
1986	Flag			
1987	From the Hip	Craig Duncan		
1988	Dead Heat	Dr. Ernest McNab		
1989	In the Name of Blood	Fergus Redding		
1990	Captain America	General Fleming		
1991	Blood and Concrete	Hank Dick		
1992	Happy Hell Night	Henry Collins		
1995	Billy Madison	Brian Madison		
1996	Small Time	Sam		
1999	Pros and Cons	Mr. Stanford		
2008	Still Waters Burn	Paddy	Filmed in 1996	

=== Television ===
Year	Title	Role	Notes	Ref.
1949	Mr. I-Magination	American soldier		
1951–1952	Casey, Crime Photographer	Casey	47 episodes	
1951–1958	Westinghouse Studio One	Tom Kendall / Johnny Quigg / Will Sorrell / Macduff	4 episodes	
1952	Tales of Tomorrow	Bruce Calvin	Episode: "The Duplicates"	
1952	The Web		Episode: "Turn Back"	
1952	Goodyear Television Playhouse		2 episodes	
1952–1953	Danger		2 episodes	
1952–1954	Suspense	Ted Larson	2 episodes	
1952–1956	Armstrong Circle Theater	Lieutenant Melvin Shadduck / Carl Broggi	3 episodes	
1953	Short Short Dramas	Fred Diamond	Episode: "The Double Cross"	
1953	The Revlon Mirror Theater		Episode: "The Enormous Rasio"	
1953	The Philco Television Playhouse		Episode: "The Rainmaker"	
1953–1955	Omnibus		3 episodes	
1954	Janet Dean, Registered Nurse	Tony Burito	2 episodes	
1954	The Campbell Playhouse		Episode: "XXXXX Isn't Everything"	
1954	Pond's Theater		2 episodes	
1954	Mama		Episode: "Mama and the Magician"	
1954	The Telltale Clue	Harry Williams	Episode: "The Case of the Talking Garden"	
1955	It's Always Jan		Episode: "Joe"	
1955	Producers' Showcase	Soldier	Episode: "Dateline II"	
1955	Alfred Hitchcock Presents	Red Hillman/Lyle Endicott	2 episodes	
1956	Matinee Theatre		Episode: "The Shining Palace"	
1956	Climax!	Walter	Episode: "Night of the Heat Wave"	
1956	Robert Montgomery Presents	Joe Gillis	Episode: "Sunset Boulevard"	
1956–1957	The Alcoa Hour	Arthur Bryan / Harrigan	2 episodes	
1958	Decision	Dan Garrett	Episode: "Man Against Crime"	
1958–1959	Mickey Spillane's Mike Hammer	Mike Hammer	78 episodes	
1959	Buckskin		Episode: "Annie's Old Beau"; Director	
1959–1961	Riverboat	Captain Grey Holden	42 episodes Directed episode "The Blowup"	
1961	The Islanders	Phil	Episode: "Island Witness"	
1961	Death Valley Days	Zacharias Gurney	Episode: "The Stolen City"; Directed episode "Queen of Spades"	
1961	Stagecoach West	Pierce Martin	Episode: "A Place of Still Waters"	
1961	Route 66	Johnny Copa	Episode: "The Opponent"	
1961	Rawhide	Jeff Hadley	S4:E2, "The Sendoff"	
1961	Witchcraft	Fred	Television film	
1962	Purex Summer Specials	James Carlisle	Episode: "The Problem Child"	
1962	The United States Steel Hour		Episode: "Marriage Marks the Spot"	
1963	Playdate	Charles Morrow	Episode: "The Day the Money Stopped"	
1963–1964	The Defenders	Marty Wisnovsky / Howard Potter	2 episodes	
1964	The Alfred Hitchcock Hour	Sheridan Westcott	Season 2 Episode 23: "A Matter of Murder"	
1964	The Nurses	Fitz Condon	Episode: "Hildie"	
1964	Bob Hope Presents the Chrysler Theatre	Joe Masson / Franklin Carson	2 episodes	
1964	Ben Casey	Greene	Episode: "Kill the Dream, but Spare the Dreamer"	
1964	The Rogues	Amos Champion	Episode: "The Diamond-Studded Pie"	
1964–1967	The Virginian	Sam Evans / Mark Troxel	2 episodes	
1965	Dr. Kildare	Prof. Felix Holman	4 episodes	
1965–1966	Gunsmoke	Will Helmick/Lon Gorman/Joe Bascome	3 episodes	
1966	Court Martial	Sgt. Joe Callaghan	Episode: "All Roads Lead to Callaghan"	
1967	Cimarron Strip	Jud Starr	Episode: "The Legend of Jud Starr"	
1967	The Man from U.N.C.L.E.	Victor Karmak	Episode: "The Deadly Quest Affair"	
1967	Mission: Impossible	J. Richard Taggart	Episode: "The Seal"	
1967	Custer	Jeb Powell	Episode: "Desperate Mission"	
1968	Walt Disney's Wonderful World of Color	Barney B. Duncan	2 episodes	
1968–1969	The Outsider	David Ross	28 episodes	
1968–1970	The Name of the Game	Eddie Gannon / Sam Hardy / Jesse Gil McCray	3 episodes	
1969	Anatomy of a Crime	David Ross	Television film	
1970	The Challenge	Jacob Gallery	Television film	
1970	The Challengers	Jim McCabe	Television film	
1970	Love, American Style	Corbett	Episode: "Love and the Fly"	
1970	Mannix	Mark	Episode: "A Ticket to the Eclipse"	
1970	Berlin Affair	Pete Killian	Television film	
1970	Tribes	Gunnery Sgt. Thomas Drake	Television film	
1970	Bracken's World	Max Lassiter	Episode: "Infinity"	
1970	Matt Lincoln		Episode: "Billy"	
1970	The Forty-Eight Hour Mile	David Ross	Television film	
1971	Banyon	Lieutenant Pete Cordova	Episode: "Pilot"	
1971	Cade's County	Courtney Vernon	Episode: "Homecoming"	
1971	The Bold Ones: The Lawyers	Kevin Ireland	Episode: "The Invasion of Kevin Ireland"	
1971	The Death of Me Yet	Joe Chalk	Television film	
1972	The Night Stalker	Carl Kolchak	Television film	
1972	Something Evil	Paul Worden	Television film	
1972	The Rookies	Sergeant Eddie Ryker	Pilot	
1972	Here Comes the Judge	Judge	Television film	
1972	Say Goodbye, Maggie Cole	Dr. Lou Grazzo	Television film	
1972–1979	The Wonderful World of Disney	John Jay Forrest / Timothy Donovan	5 episodes	
1973	The Night Strangler	Carl Kolchak	Television film	
1973	The Six Million Dollar Man	Oliver Spencer	Pilot movie	
1973–1974	The Evil Touch	Alvin Hazeltine / George Manners / Dr. Thomas Sullivan	3 episodes Also directed episode "A Game of Hearts"	
1974	Shaft	Capt. Brian Brewster	Episode: "Cop Killer"	
1974	Owen Marshall: Counselor at Law	McClain	Episode: "A Stranger Among Us"	
1974	Police Story	Matt Hallett	Episode: "The Ripper"	
1974–1975	Kolchak: The Night Stalker	Carl Kolchak	20 episodes Also executive producer	
1976	Brink's: The Great Robbery	James McNally	Television film	
1976	Law and Order	Deputy Chief Brian O'Malley	Television film	
1978	The Users	Henry Waller	Television film	
1978	Fantasy Island	Victor Duncan	"Episode: "Let the Goodtimes Roll/Nightmare/The Tiger"	
1979	Donovan's Kid	Timothy Donovan	Television film	
1979	Ike	General George S. Patton	Television miniseries; aka Ike: The War Years	
1979	Not Until Today	Chief Jason Swan	Television film	
1979	Love for Rent	Coach John Martin	Television film	
1979	A Bond of Iron	William Weaver	Television film	
1980	The Martian Chronicles	Sam Parkhill	Miniseries	
1980	Waikiki	Captain	Television film	
1980	The Love Boat	Lawrence Evans	2 episodes	
1981	Nero Wolfe	John Alan Bredeman	Episode: "Gambit"	
1981	Magnum, P.I.	Buck Gibson	Episode: "Mad Buck Gibson"	
1983	Freedom to Speak		Television miniseries	
1983	Small & Frye	Nick Small	5 episodes	
1983	Tales of the Unexpected	Sheriff Milt Singleton	Episode: "Heir Presumptuous"	
1984	The Return of Marcus Welby, M.D.	Dr. David Jennings	Television film	
1984	The Baron and the Kid	Jack Beamer	Television film	
1985	My Wicked, Wicked Ways: The Legend of Errol Flynn	Dr. Garrett Koets	Television film	
1985	The O'Briens	The Father	Television film	
1985	The Hitchhiker	Old Man	Episode: "Nightshift"	
1985	Tales from the Darkside	Van Conway	Episode: "Distant Signals"	
1986	Worlds Beyond	Harry Hewart	Episode: "Voice from the Gallows"	
1987	CBS Summer Playhouse	Walter	Episode: "Day to Day"	
1987	Tales from the Hollywood Hills: A Table at Ciro's	A.D. Nathan	Television film	
1988	Highway to Heaven	Hale Stoddard	Episode: "The Correspondent"	
1988	Inherit the Wind	E.K. Hornbeck	Television film	
1988	The Diamond Trap	Walter Vadney	Television film	
1989	Around the World in 80 Days	Benjamin Mudge	Miniseries	
1989	Monsters	Hubert	Episode: "Portrait of the Artist"	
1989–1992	Murphy Brown	Bill Brown	5 episodes Nominated—Primetime Emmy Award for Outstanding Guest Actor in a Comedy Series (1990)	
1990	Kojak: It's Always Something	Wainright	Television film	
1990	By Dawn's Early Light	Condor	Television film	
1990	Child in the Night	Os Windfield	Television film	
1990	Big	Mr. MacMillan	Pilot episode	
1991	The General Motors Playwrights Theater	Albert Kroll	Episode: "Clara"	
1991	Perfect Harmony	Mr. Hobbs	Television film	
1992	Civil Wars	Noah Caldecott	Episode: "Shop 'til You Drop"	
1992	Murder, She Wrote	Martin Tremaine	Episode: "Angel of Death"	
1992	Mastergate	Folsom Bunting	Television film	
1992	Sibs	Ben	Episode: "If I Only Had a Dad"	
1993	The American Clock	Old Arthur Huntington	Television film	
1994	A Perfect Stranger	John Henry Phillips	Television film	
1995	Fudge	Buster	Episode: "Fudge-a-mania"	
1995	Sisters	Judge Harrison Bradford	Episode: "Judgement Day"	
1995	Derby	Lester Corbett	Television film	
1995	Burke's Law	Conrad Hill	Episode: "Who Killed the King of the Country Club?"	
1995	Gargoyles	Dominic Dracon/G.F. Benton (voice)	Episode: "The Silver Falcon"	
1995	Fallen Angels	Old Man	Episode: "Fly Paper"	
1995	The Commish	Terry Boyle	2 episodes	
1996	Grace Under Fire	Grace's Dad	Episode: "Take Me to Your Breeder"	
1997	Touched by an Angel	George Zarko	Episode: "Missing in Action"	
1997	Millennium	Henry Black	Episode: "Midnight of the Century"	
1998–1999	The X-Files	Arthur Dales	2 episodes	

== Stage credits ==
Year	Title	Role	Notes	Ref.
1949–1950	Death of a Salesman	Happy Lohman	Touring production	
1954	My Three Angels	Alfred	Morosco Theatre	
1955	The Rainmaker	Bill Starbuck	Cort Theatre	
1956	The Innkeepers	David McGregor	John Golden Theatre	
1956	The Lovers	Chrysagon de la Crux	Martin Beck Theatre	
1958	The Tunnel of Love	Dick Pepper	Martin Beck Theatre	
1959	Two for the Seesaw	Jerry Ryan	Booth Theatre	
1961	Blood, Sweat and Stanley Poole	Stanley Pool	Morosco Theatre	
1964	A Thousand Clowns	Murray Burns	Pocono Playhouse	
1966	The King and I	The King	Ambassador Theatre	
1967	Dinner at Eight	Larry	Alvin Theatre	
1993–1994	Greetings	Phil Gorski	John Houseman Theatre	
