= Tattoos & Tequila =

Tattoos and Tequila

Studio album by Vince Neil
- Released: June 22, 2010
- Genres: Hard rock, glam metal
- Length: 38:29
- Label: Eleven Seven Music

Vince Neil chronology
Live at the Whisky: One Night Only (2003)	Tattoos and Tequila (2010)

Singles from Tattoos & Tequila
- 1. "Tattoos & Tequila" Released: 2010

Professional ratings
Review scores
Source	Rating
Allmusic	3/5 stars
Muzic ManiAxed	4/5 stars
Never Too Loud	3/5 stars

Tattoos & Tequila is the third and most recent solo studio album by Mötley Crüe frontman Vince Neil. It is his first solo release in 7 years since the live album Live at the Whisky: One Night Only in 2003 and first solo studio album in 15 years since 1995's Carved in Stone. It is his first release on Eleven Seven Music.

== Background ==
The album is largely made up of covers of 1970s rock songs, with only a couple of original tracks thrown in: the title track and lead single "Tattoos & Tequila", written by Marti Frederiksen, and "Another Bad Day", written by Nikki Sixx, James Michael and Tracii Guns. Neil described the album as having "nothing to do with Motley Crue... Tattoos and Tequila is basically my life".

Tattoos and Tequila was recorded with current Slaughter members Jeff Blando (guitar), Dana Strum (bass) and drummer Zoltan Chaney.

The album is a soundtrack to the book Vince released in the same year, "Tattoos & Tequila: To Hell and Back with One of Rock's Most Notorious Frontmen". Each song on the record corresponds with a chapter in the book. The album's title track was released as a single and charted at number 36 on the Billboard Mainstream Rock charts and features a music video.

As stated in an interview conducted with Nikki Sixx on Sixx Sense radio, the track, "Another Bad Day" was originally slated for Mötley Crüe. However, the band's drummer Tommy Lee disliked the song.

In 2010, Vince joined the Scorpions to perform their song "Another Piece of Meat."

== Track listing ==
No.	Title	Writer(s)	Original artist (date)	Length
1.	"Tattoos & Tequila"	Marti Frederiksen	Vince Neil (2010)	3:44
2.	"He's a Whore"	Rick Nielsen	Cheap Trick (1977)	2:49
3.	"AC/DC"	Mike Chapman; Nicky Chinn	Sweet (1974)	4:08
4.	"Nobody's Fault"	Brad Whitford; Steven Tyler	Aerosmith (1976)	4:44
5.	"Another Bad Day"	Nikki Sixx; James Michael; Tracii Guns; Kevin Kadish	Vince Neil (2010)	4:07
6.	"No Feelings"	Steve Jones; Glen Matlock; Paul Cook; Johnny Rotten	Sex Pistols (1977)	2:50
7.	"Long Cool Woman"	Allan Clarke; Roger Cook; Roger Greenaway	The Hollies (1971)	3:27
8.	"Another Piece of Meat"	Rudolf Schenker; Herman Rarebell	Scorpions (1979)	3:08
9.	"Who'll Stop the Rain"	John Fogerty	Creedence Clearwater Revival (1970)	2:51
10.	"Viva Las Vegas"	Doc Pomus; Mort Shuman	Elvis Presley (1964)	2:54
11.	"Bitch Is Back"	Elton John; Bernie Taupin	Elton John (1974)	3:48
12.	"Beer Drinkers & Hell Raisers" (bonus track)	Billy Gibbons; Dusty Hill; Frank Beard	ZZ Top (1973)	2:45
Total length:				38:29

== Credits ==
- Vince Neil – lead vocals, tuba
- Jeff Blando – guitars, backing vocals
- Dana Strum – bass
- Zoltan Chaney – drums, percussion

== Charts ==
=== Album ===
Chart (2010)	Peak position
US Billboard 200	57
US Independent Albums (Billboard)	7
US Top Rock Albums (Billboard)	14
US Hard Rock Albums (Billboard)	6

=== Singles ===
Year	Title	Chart	Position
2010	"Tattoos & Tequila"	US Mainstream Rock	36
2010	"Tattoos & Tequila"	US Heritage Rock	10
