= Live at the Whisky: One Night Only =

Live album by Vince Neil
- Released: May 27, 2003
- Genre: Heavy metal
- Label: Image Entertainment

Vince Neil chronology
Carved in Stone (1995)	Live at the Whisky: One Night Only (2003)	Tattoos & Tequila (2010)

Professional ratings
Review scores
Source	Rating
Allmusic	3/5 stars

Live at the Whisky: One Night Only is a live album by Vince Neil, lead vocalist of heavy metal band Mötley Crüe, recorded at the Whisky a Go Go.

== Content ==
The album includes songs originally performed by Mötley Crüe with the exception of "Look in Her Eyes" which originally appeared on Neil's 1993 solo album Exposed. On the album's cover art, the sign on the nightclub identifies it as "The Whisky" as opposed to its actual name, "Whisky a Go Go".

== Track listing ==
1. "Kickstart My Heart" (Sixx) 6:22
2. "Knock 'Em Dead, Kid" (Neil, Sixx) 3:41
3. "Look in Her Eyes" (Neil, Soussan, Stevens) 5:37
4. "Red Hot" (Mars, Neil, Sixx) 3:43
5. "Piece of Your Action" (Neil, Sixx) 4:16
6. "Girls, Girls, Girls" (Lee, Mars, Sixx) 3:34
7. "Same Ol' Situation (S.O.S.)" (Lee, Mars, Neil, Sixx) 4:26
8. "Home Sweet Home" (Lee, Neil, Sixx) 5:10
9. "Looks That Kill" (Sixx) 4:34
10. "Dr. Feelgood" (Mars, Sixx) 6:33
11. "Smokin' in the Boys Room" (Koda, Lutz) 4:18
12. "Live Wire" (Sixx) 5:39

== Credits ==
- Vince Neil – lead vocals, "waga" yells
- Brent Woods – guitar
- Jamie Hunting – bass guitar
- Brent Fitz – drums, keyboards
