= Smokestack Lightning (disambiguation) =

"Smokestack Lightning" is a 1956 single recorded by Howlin' Wolf, and subsequently covered by many rock and blues bands and musicians.

Smokestack Lightning may also refer to:

- Smokestack Lightning (album), a 1972 album by British singer Mike Harrison
- Smokestack Lightning: Adventures in the Heart of Barbecue Country, a 1996 book by American writer Lolis Eric Elie
- Smokestack Lightning: A Day in the Life of Barbecue, a 2001 documentary film produced by American Lolis Eric Elie
- Smokestack Lightnin' (band), an American rock band active in the mid-1960s
