= Robert Clouse =

American film director and producer (1928–1997)

- Born: March 6, 1928; Denison, Iowa, U.S.
- Died: February 4, 1997 (aged 68); Ashland, Oregon, U.S.
- Occupation: Film director/producer
- Years active: 1970–1992

Robert Clouse (March 6, 1928 – February 4, 1997) was an American film director and producer, known primarily for his work in the action/adventure and martial arts genres. He died on February 4, 1997, in Oregon of kidney failure.

Clouse directed Bruce Lee in Lee's second English-speaking film starring role (the other being Marlowe), 1973's Enter the Dragon.

After Lee's death, Clouse completed Lee's final film, The Game of Death, and released it as Game of Death in 1978 with a new storyline and cast. Other projects included Black Belt Jones (1974), Darker than Amber (1970), China O'Brien (1990), Jackie Chan's The Big Brawl (1980), Gymkata (1985), The Ultimate Warrior (1975), and others.

== Early life ==
Before becoming a director, Clouse worked as a still photographer for CBS Television and served in the U.S. Army during the Korean War. Despite rumors to the contrary, he was not deaf.

== Short films (1960s) ==
Clouse was also nominated, twice, for an Oscar for his short films The Legend of Jimmy Blue Eyes (1964) and The Cadillac (1962). At the 1964 Cannes Film Festival, his film The Legend of Jimmy Blue Eyes was also nominated for the Palme d'Or for Best Short Film. For The Legend of Jimmy Blue Eyes, Clouse was awarded a Golden Globe and an award at the Edinburgh Film Festival.

== 1970s ==
Clouse made his feature directorial debut with Dreams of Glass, a love story between an Asian girl and white boy, starring John Denos and Caroline Barrett. He then followed that film with Darker Than Amber (1970) (based on the John D. MacDonald novel of the same name) and starring Rod Taylor as the protagonist, Travis McGee. Both films were completed and released in 1970, however Darker than Amber was released in theatres before Dreams of Glass arrived.

In 1971, Clouse directed an episode of the action-crime TV show Ironside, entitled "Gentle Oaks" (1971). Ironside also featured Bruce Lee as Leon Soo, a Karate/Aikido/Judo instructor in a martial arts school (in the episode "Tagged for Murder" (1967)), an icon with whom Clouse would later collaborate for much of his career. In 1973, he directed Enter the Dragon. After that film, Clouse directed Black Belt Jones (1974). The rest of the 1970s for Clouse would yield the films Golden Needles (1974), The Ultimate Warrior (1975) (director and screenwriter), The Pack (1977) (director and screenwriter), The Amsterdam Kill (1977) (director and screenwriter), Game of Death (1978), The London Connection (1979), and two episodes of Walt Disney's Wonderful World of Color.

=== Enter the Dragon ===
In 1973, Clouse collaborated with Bruce Lee and directed his most iconic, immortal and memorable film, Enter the Dragon, working with Jim Kelly for the first time, with whom he would collaborate again in his following film, Black Belt Jones (1974). Enter the Dragon was well received by critics upon its release, grossed an estimated $25,000,000 in North America, and an estimated $90,000,000 worldwide on a tight budget of just $850,000. It was also considered by many as one of the best films of 1973.

In 1999, Enter the Dragon grossed more than $200,000,000 worldwide and in 2004, Enter the Dragon was deemed "culturally significant" in the United States and selected for preservation in the National Film Registry.

Clouse would collaborate with several actors from Enter the Dragon on his later films, including Bruce Lee (at least archival footage of Bruce Lee, in Game of Death (1978)), Jim Kelly in Black Belt Jones (1974), Robert Wall in both Game of Death (1978), Keye Luke (who provided the voice of Mr. Han in Enter the Dragon (1973)) in The Amsterdam Kill (1977), and Bolo Yeung in Ironheart (1992).

=== Game of Death ===
In 1978, Clouse re-teamed with Bruce Lee again for Game of Death (1978) (director and screenwriter), having to finish the footage in creative ways after Lee's death. For that film, he made a trip to Hong Kong, where Golden Harvest's Raymond Chow hired him in order to direct a "comeback" film for Lee, despite the fact that Lee had died in 1973, five years earlier. Clouse was provided incomplete footage from Lee's original version of The Game of Death that had already been filmed, but ultimately made the creative decision to use a small portion of that footage, primarily due to the fact that the film's plot and story had been re-done many times in a multitude of Hong Kong cinema films after Lee's death. By enlisting some of Lee's friends, including Bob Wall and Sammo Hung, editing in footage from other Bruce Lee movies (as well as using the originally shot The Game of Death footage), and relying on a number of Bruce Lee stand-ins and look-alikes, Clouse was able to make the film.

== 1980s ==
During the 1980s, Clouse directed a TV movie entitled The Kids Who Knew Too Much (1980) (based on one of the episodes he directed for the TV show, Walt Disney's Wonderful World of Color) and decided to take a chance with Jackie Chan for The Big Brawl (1980) (director and screenwriter), which Chan stated was a failure because he didn't get a chance to direct the action scenes the way he wanted to.

In the 1980s, Clouse also directed Force: Five (1981; which he co- wrote). He followed that film with Deadly Eyes (1982) and also directed an episode of The Master called "Max" (1984). His last film of the 1980s was Gymkata (1985).

In 1985, he launched The Hawk Corporation, with Republic Pictures, who had access to 31 home video projects, giving them a 24% stake in the new company, and Clouse controlling a 52% share in the new company, in order to launch all direct-to-video projects.

== 1990s ==
In the 1990s, his final decade of directing films, Clouse directed China O'Brien (1990), and its direct-to-video sequel, China O'Brien II (1990). Clouse's final film was Ironheart (1992), a film for Bolo Yeung, and which was created as a showcase for the film's producer, Britton K. Lee. He was portrayed by director Rob Cohen in Dragon: The Bruce Lee Story.

== TV work ==
Clouse was one of the directors of the television series The Master, which was broadcast in 1984 and featured a ninja called "Okasa", a recurring character played by Sho Kosugi. The episode of The Master he directed was entitled "Max" (1984). He directed episodes of Walt Disney's Wonderful World of Color in the late 1970s and early 1980s - "The Kids Know Too Much" (1980) and "The Omega Connection" (1979). In the 1970s, he also directed an episode of Ironside entitled "Gentle Oaks".

== Writing work ==
Clouse wrote the screenplay (or story) for most of his films, including Dreams of Glass (1970), The Ultimate Warrior (1975), The Pack (1977), The Amsterdam Kill (1977), Game of Death (1978; also credited as Jan Spears), The Big Brawl (1980), Force: Five (1981), China O'Brien (1990) and China O'Brien II (1990). He wrote the screenplays for Something Evil (1972). and Happy Mother's Day, Love George (1973).

== Death ==
Clouse died on February 4, 1997, of kidney failure. His remains were cremated and scattered into the Pacific Ocean.

== Bruce Lee biography ==
Clouse also wrote and published a biography on Lee, entitled Bruce Lee: The Biography which was published in 1989 by Unique Publications. The book's description recites "Finally, the truth can be told about Bruce Lee's remarkable life and tragic death. Close personal friend and director of Bruce's greatest movie, Robert Clouse, reveals his first-hand memories of Bruce and includes interviews with Bruce's family, friends and colleagues in order to tell us the true story of how Bruce lived and died. Also included are numerous photos, many never before made available to the public." The book was also used as one of the source materials for Rob Cohen's film, Dragon: The Bruce Lee Story (1993).

An excerpt from the book, in Clouse's voice, reads:

My direct contact with Bruce Lee occurred between November 1972 and June 1973 when I started pre-production of the film Enter The Dragon and through the post-production period when Bruce came to the Warner Brothers Studio in Burbank, California, to complete some dubbing of dialogue that had been poorly recorded in Hong Kong. Many of the people I interviewed for this book I had known from that time, but many others I met for the first time during research of Bruce Lee. My perceptions of Bruce were dented and bent from what I knew about him; others were destroyed. Piecing together the portrait is imprecise, but the attempt goes on.

== Filmography ==
=== Films ===
Title	Year	Director	Writer	Producer	Notes
The Cadillac	1962	Yes	No	Yes	Short film
The Legend of Jimmy Blue Eyes	1964	Yes	No	Yes	Short film
Darker Than Amber	1970	Yes	No	No	
Dreams of Glass	1970	Yes	Yes	Yes	Directorial debut
Happy Mother's Day, Love George	1973	No	Yes	No	
Enter the Dragon	1973	Yes	No	No	Cameo: Thugs #1
Black Belt Jones	1974	Yes	No	No	
Golden Needles	1974	Yes	No	No	
The Ultimate Warrior	1975	Yes	Yes	No	
The Pack	1977	Yes	Yes	No	
The Amsterdam Kill	1977	Yes	Yes	No	
Game of Death	1978	Yes	Yes	No	Cameo: Carl's Second #1
The Omega Connection	1979	Yes	No	No	
The Big Brawl	1980	Yes	Yes	No	
Force: Five	1981	Yes	Yes	No	
Deadly Eyes	1982	Yes	No	No	
Gymkata	1985	Yes	No	No	
China O'Brien	1990	Yes	Yes	Yes	
China O'Brien II	1990	Yes	Yes	Yes	
Ironheart	1992	Yes	No	No	Final film

=== Television ===
Title	Year(s)	Director	Writer	Notes
Ironside	1971	Yes	No	Episode "Gentle Oaks"
Something Evil	1972	No	Yes	TV film
Disneyland	1979-1980	Yes	No	2 episodes
The Master	1984	Yes	No	Episode "Max"
