= Live at the Whisky a Go Go =

Live at the Whisky a Go Go may refer to:

- Live at the Whisky a Go Go from Humble Pie
- Live at the Whisky a Go Go (Herbie Mann album)
- Live at the Whiskey a Go-Go (The Stooges album)
- Live at the Whisky a Go-Go (X album)
- Live at the Whisky a Go Go: The Complete Recordings by Otis Redding
- Live at the Whisky by Kansas
- Live at the Whisky 1998 by Prototype
- Live at The Whisky 1977 by Cheap Trick
- Live at the Whisky by Green Day
- Live at the Whisky by Mentors (band)
- Live at the Whisky by Stryper
- Live at the Whisky: One Night Only by Vince Neil
- Germicide: Live at the Whisky, 1977
- Killers Live at the Whiskey
- Live at the Whisky A-Go-Go by Alice Cooper
- Recorded Live at Hollywood's Famous Whisky a Go-Go by Jon and the Nightriders
- Live at the Whisky A Go Go by Everclear (2023)
- Whisky a Go Go 1968 by The Mothers of Invention (2024)

== See also ==
- Category:Albums recorded at the Whisky a Go Go
