= High Velocity (film) =

1976 film

- Film poster
- Directed by: Remi Kramer
- Screenplay by: Remi Kramer; Michael Parsons
- Produced by: Takafumi Ohashi
- Starring: Ben Gazzara; Britt Ekland; Paul Winfield; Keenan Wynn
- Cinematography: Robert Paynter
- Edited by: David Bretherton
- Music by: Jerry Goldsmith
- Production company: First Asian Films of California
- Distributed by: Turtle Releasing Organization
- Release date: 1976
- Running time: 105 minutes
- Languages: English; Tagalog

High Velocity is a 1976 American independent action film that was the only film of director Remi Kramer, who also co-wrote the screenplay.

== Plot ==
An American business executive is kidnapped by a revolutionary guerrilla group in an unnamed Asian nation. Unwilling to meet the terrorist's demands or to use the security forces of the nation, the victim's employer and his wife hire two fun-loving American expatriate Vietnam veterans to rescue him. Together with their local friend and guide, the trio find out that they are up against an unexpected and deadly enemy.

== Cast ==
- Ben Gazzara as Cliff Baumgartner
- Britt Ekland as Mrs. Andersen
- Paul Winfield as Watson
- Keenan Wynn as Mr. Andersen
- Alejandro Rey as Alejandro Martel
- Victoria Racimo as Dolores
- Joonee Gamboa as Commander Habagat
- Rita Gomez as Nancy
- Joe Andrade as Manong
- Liam Dunn as Bennett
- Richard O'Brien as Beaumont
- Stacy Keach, Sr. as Carter
- James Bacon as Monroe
- Jojo Juan as Celia
- Hernan Robles as a gaol guard
- Kim Ramos as an officer

== Production ==
High Velocity was the only completed film of First Asian Films of California who contracted with Filmways Productions (Philippines) to supply local facilities and crews. Japanese producer Takafumi Ohashi selected Remi Kramer who had previously received a 1971 Clio Award, directed several Marlboro Man commercials and designed the film title design for The Doris Day Show. Kramer co-wrote the film with Michael Joaquin Parsons (?-September 15, 2013), who had been involved in the Philippine film industry since the 1960s. The cinematographer, Robert Paynter was English and the stunt director, Clem Parsons was Australian. Paynter shot the film in Panavision using Panavision Silent Reflex (PSR) camera, with Superspeed 35, 50, 75, and 100-millimeter lenses to cope with the extensive low light levels at night in the jungle and Manila's Chinatown. Filming began in 1974 with production completed in 1975. First Asian Films of California then planned a US$4 million film about General John J. Pershing but the film was never produced.
