= You're Invited (But Your Friend Can't Come) =

Single by Vince Neil

from the album Exposed
- Released: 1992
- Recorded: 1992
- Genre: Heavy metal, hard rock, glam metal
- Length: 3:52
- Label: Warner Bros.
- Songwriters: Vince Neil, Jack Blades, Tommy Shaw

Vince Neil singles chronology
| "You're Invited (But Your Friend Can't Come)" (1992) | "Sister of Pain" (1993) |

"You're Invited (But Your Friend Can't Come)" is the debut single by American musician Vince Neil and his first solo single.

== Background ==
This song exists in two different versions, the first of which was included on the soundtrack to the Pauly Shore movie Encino Man; a music video was later released for this version featuring a cameo from Shore. The track was later re-recorded for the 1993 album Exposed with Billy Idol guitarist Steve Stevens.

== Personnel ==
Encino Man soundtrack version (1992)

- Vince Neil – vocals
- Tommy Shaw – guitars, backing vocals
- Jack Blades – bass, backing vocals
- Michael Cartellone – drums
- Ron Nevison - production, engineering

Exposed album version (1993)

- Vince Neil – vocals
- Steve Stevens – guitars, bass
- Vik Foxx – drums
- Ron Nevison - production, engineering

== Track listing ==
1. "You're Invited (But Your Friend Can't Come)" - 3:52

== Charts ==
| Chart (1992) | Peak position |
|---|---|
| Australia (ARIA) | 74 |
| UK Singles (OCC) | 63 |
| US Mainstream Rock (Billboard) | 17 |
