= Dreams of Glass =

- Directed by: Robert Clouse
- Written by: Robert Clouse
- Starring: John Denos; Caroline Barrett
- Music by: Ian Freebairn-Smith
- Production company: Universal Pictures
- Distributed by: Universal Pictures
- Release date: August 16, 1970
- Running time: 83 minutes
- Country: United States
- Language: English

Dreams of Glass is a 1970 American drama film directed by Robert Clouse. It marked Danny DeVito's film debut.

== Plot ==
Ann is the owner of a famous nursery and greenhouse from the Japanese family. Tom is from a blue-collar family of self-employed fishermen. They make a relationship, despite obstacles their families get in their way.

== Cast ==
- John Denos as Tomm Parsegian
- Caroline Barrett as Ann Murakoshi
- Joe Lo Presti as Sam Parsegian
- Donald Elson as Timothy
- Danny DeVito as Thug
- Smokestack Lightnin' as the band

== See also ==
- List of American films of 1970
