= Vince Neil =

American singer (born 1961)

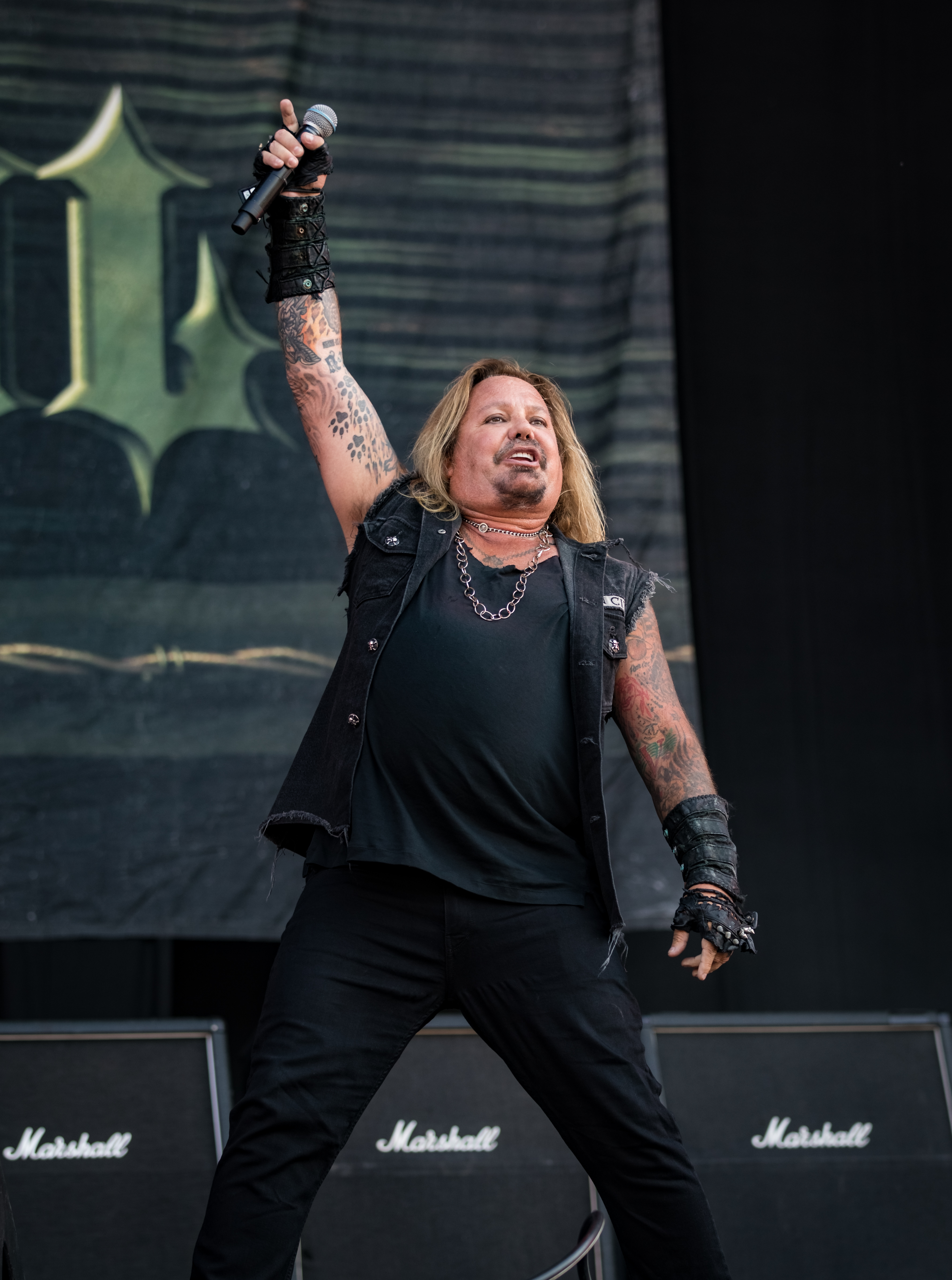
- Neil performing at Wacken Open Air in 2018

Background information
- Born: Vincent Neil Wharton; February 8, 1961 (age 65); Inglewood, California, U.S.
- Origin: Glendora, California, U.S.
- Genres: Heavy metal; hard rock; glam metal
- Occupations: Singer, musician
- Years active: 1981–present
- Member of: Mötley Crüe
- Formerly of: Hear 'n Aid
- Spouses: Beth Lynn (m. 1981; div. 1985) Sharise Ruddell (m. 1987; div. 1993) Heidi Mark (m. 2000; div. 2001) Lia Gerardini (m. 2005; div. 2010)

Vincent Neil Wharton (born February 8, 1961) is an American musician and singer. He is the lead vocalist of heavy metal band Mötley Crüe, which he fronted from their 1981 formation until his departure in 1992. Neil reunited with the band in 1996 and continued with them until the band's 2015 retirement, and again from the band's 2018 reunion onwards. Outside of Mötley Crüe, Neil has also released three studio albums as a solo artist – the most recent of which, Tattoos & Tequila, was released in 2010. Neil's visual aesthetic and distinctive singing voice are considered synonymous with the American glam metal movement of the 1980s.

== Early life ==
Neil was born in Inglewood, California, to Shirley (née Ortiz) and Clois "Odie" Wharton. He has Mexican ancestry on his mother's side and Native American ancestry on his father's. During the 1960s, his family moved around Southern California from Inglewood to Watts, before finally settling in Glendora, attending Sunflower Intermediate School and later Royal Oak High School. His biggest musical influence in the early days was Van Halen, imitating the look and the attitude of their frontman David Lee Roth. He also cited AC/DC, Aerosmith, Creedence Clearwater Revival, Journey and The Beach Boys among his favorite artists. As well as having an interest in music while a teenager, Neil was also interested in surfing, basketball, baseball, football and wrestling.

== Music career ==
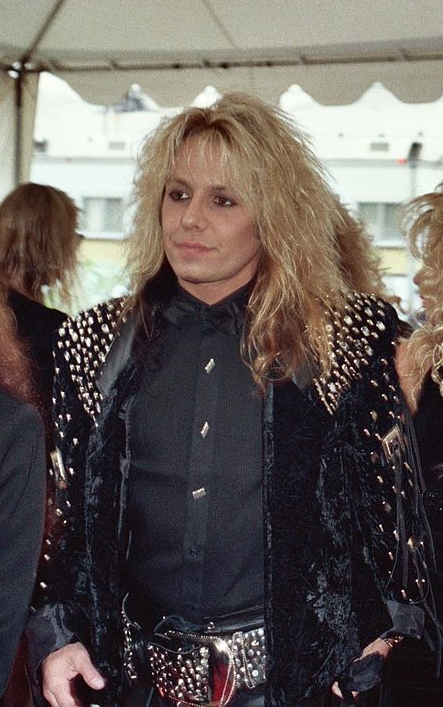
Neil at the 1990 Grammy Awards

=== Mötley Crüe ===
Neil was discovered while performing with his band Rock Candy and joined Mötley Crüe in 1981. The newly formed band was seeking a lead vocalist and was impressed by Neil after seeing him perform live at drummer Tommy Lee's suggestion. Lee had known Neil in high school and thought the vocalist's image would fit well with the new band. With Mötley Crüe, Neil made his recording debut with the band's 1981 debut album Too Fast for Love. The band's next album, 1983's Shout at the Devil, brought Mötley Crüe to international stardom, and a string of hit releases throughout the decade including Theatre of Pain, Girls, Girls, Girls and the number 1 album Dr. Feelgood established the band as one of the most popular rock acts in the world. Producer Tom Werman, who produced much of Mötley Crüe's material in the 1980s, has said that Neil is the least artistic and least involved in the creative process of all the band members.

=== Firing ===
Following the release of Mötley Crüe's 1991 greatest hits album Decade of Decadence 81–91, Neil and the band parted ways. Neil's drinking was beginning to affect his ability to perform, and after he failed to show up for a band rehearsal on February 10, 1992, Sixx, Lee and Mars agreed that the vocalist was "holding us back". At the time, the band blamed Neil's race car driving in the Indy Lights circuit as the reason for the decision, releasing a statement that read "Race car driving has become a priority in Neil's life. His bandmates felt he didn't share their determination and passion for music." Prior to his firing, Sixx says the band was open with him that they were considering a new lead vocalist, with Sixx telling him "We are down here working, and we want to be here. This isn't going to happen if you don't want to be here and we have to force you out of bed every afternoon because you've been out all night drinking." Lee accused him of failing to contribute to the creative process and Neil stormed out, and his firing was announced to the public four days later.

=== Going solo ===
Neil's debut solo single was "You're Invited (But Your Friend Can't Come)" from the soundtrack to the Les Mayfield movie Encino Man (1992). The song's music video features a cameo from Pauly Shore and clips from the movie.

Exposed (1993) was Neil's first solo album, debuting at No. 13 on the Billboard charts, and featuring a re-recording of his first single. His band at this point included Steve Stevens, Dave Marshall, Robbie Crane, and Vikki Foxx; the band eventually went on tour, opening for Van Halen.

Pornographic film actress Janine Lindemulder can be seen in the video for the second single "Sister of Pain". "Can't Change Me" was released as the third single featuring a video filmed at the Record Plant, and the video for the fourth single, "Can't Have Your Cake", featured actress Pamela Anderson as well as Neil's son Neil Wharton who portrayed a young Vince Neil.

=== Carved in Stone ===
In September 1995, Neil released Carved in Stone, an industrial-oriented album produced by the Dust Brothers. It was recorded and then put on hold while Neil was dealing with the illness of his daughter Skylar. The album charted at No. 139 on the Billboard 200. The song "Skylar's Song", dedicated to his daughter, was released as a single for the album and featured a music video, and "The Crawl" was released as a promo single. The album sold fewer than 100,000 copies in the US, and Neil's contract with Warner Bros. Records eventually came to an end. The album was re-released in 2004.

Neil toured with his solo band, which by then consisted of Slaughter members Jeff Blando and Dana Strum, as well as drummer Zoltan Chaney.

=== Reunion with Mötley Crüe ===
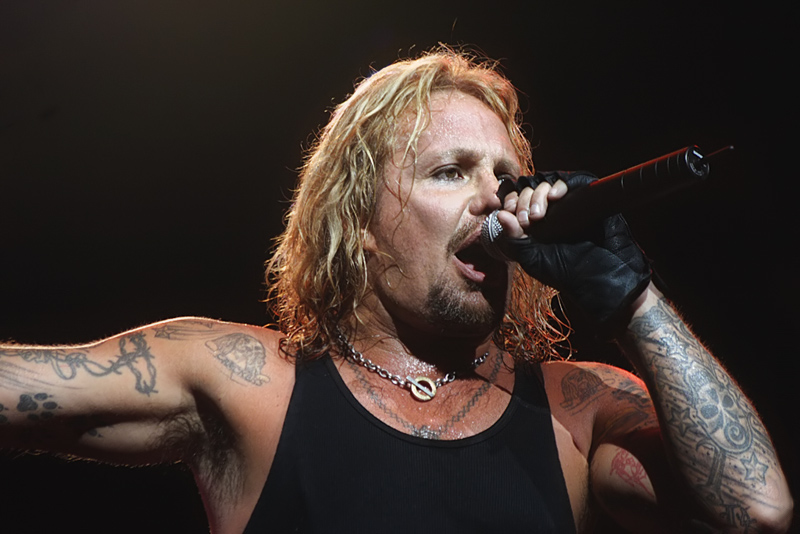
Neil with Mötley Crüe in 2007

By 1997, Neil's solo career and the John Corabi-fronted Mötley Crüe's album sales and concert attendance were declining, leading to the reunion of the band's classic lineup that year. "They admitted they couldn't do it without me", he recalled, "and I wasn't selling records the way Mötley Crüe had." They released Generation Swine, which debuted at No. 4 on the Billboard charts. Mötley Crüe further re-entered the zeitgeist after their Behind the Music episode aired on VH1 in December 1998 and became the highest-rated in the series, warranting a DVD release of the episode with ten extra minutes of footage in December 1999. Tension soon erupted, however, this time prompting Tommy Lee to leave. The other members replaced him with Randy Castillo and recorded New Tattoo in 2000. The renewed band went on hiatus when Castillo died from cancer in 2002.

Neil next solo release was Live at the Whisky: One Night Only in 2003.

Mötley's fortunes got a boost when Neil and Lee put aside their differences to tour in support of the 2005 compilation Red, White & Crüe. Dubbed Carnival of Sins, the tour featured acrobats, fire breathers and a midget as part of the overall circus atmosphere the band created.

In 2008, Mötley Crüe released the album Saints of Los Angeles, again featuring all the original members.

=== 2010s ===
Neil released his third solo album, Tattoos & Tequila in 2010, a soundtrack to his concurrent book, Tattoos & Tequila: To Hell and Back with One of Rock's Most Notorious Frontmen. Each song on the album corresponds with a chapter in the book. The album's title track was released as a single with a music video.

Neil contributed a cover of Japanese rock band L'Arc-en-Ciel's song "Blurry Eyes" to their 2012 tribute album.

Following Mötley Crüe's 2014 and 2015 final world tour, Neil confirmed in September 2018 that the band had reformed and plans to release new music.

In November 2016, Neil revealed that he had been contacted and was scheduled to play with his own band at the inauguration of Donald Trump in Washington, D.C., on January 20, 2017. "I don't know how long I have to play. I don't know if the Republican Party says which (songs) to play and what not to do," said Neil.

== Other ventures ==
=== Business ventures ===
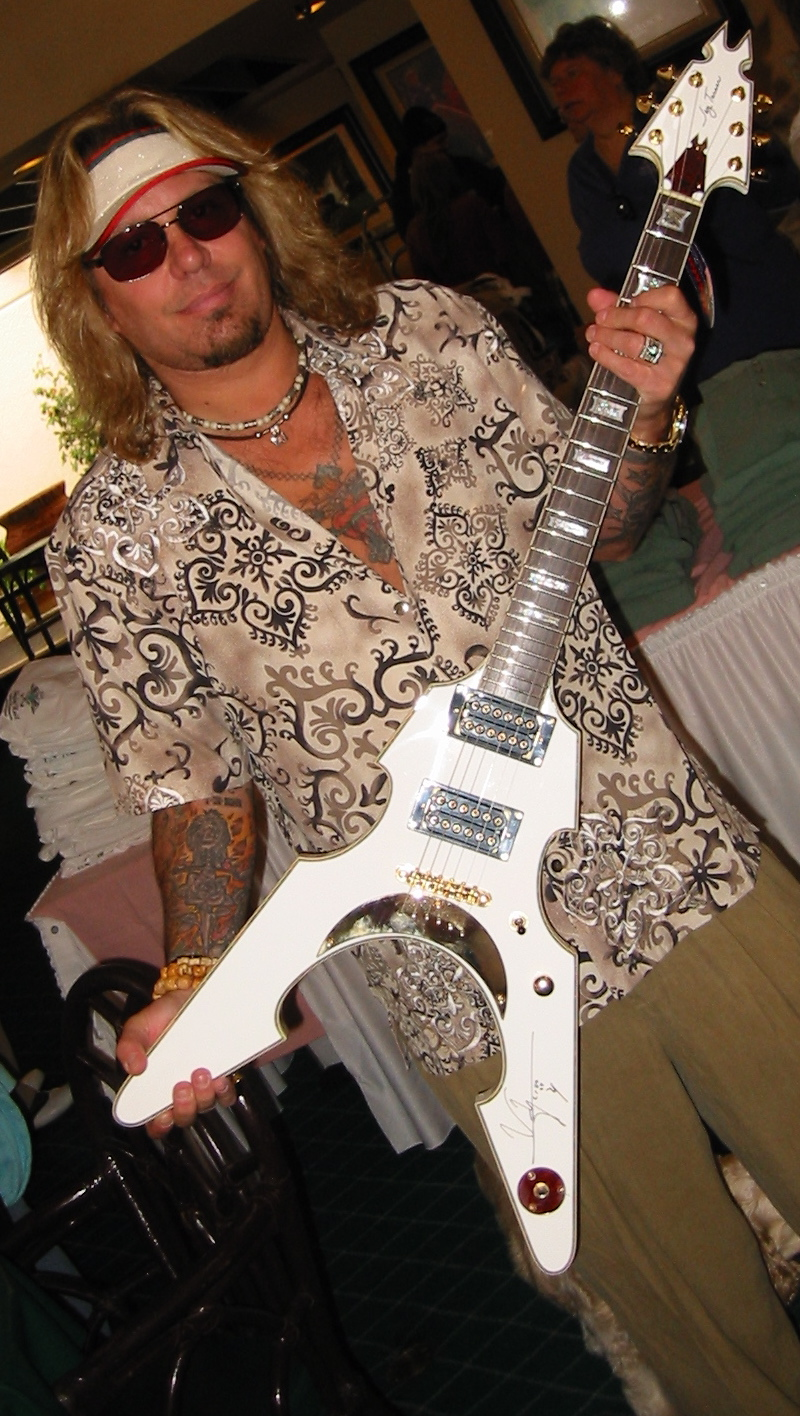
Neil in 2005

In 1994, Neil gave up ownership of his Bar One club.

In 1998, Mötley Crüe opened a store on Melrose Avenue in Los Angeles called S'Crüe, which stocks clothes from both Sixx and Neil's clothing lines (Outlaw and Bad Bones), along with CDs, the Mötley Brüe drink and other items. The store closed in January 1999, with the band deciding to sell the items online.

In 2006, Neil opened a tattoo parlor called Vince Neil Ink, located on the Las Vegas Strip.

Neil founded Vince Vineyards, a winemaking venture that produced a 2003 Napa Cabernet Sauvignon and a 2003 Sonoma County Chardonnay. He also produces a limited edition Petite Sirah through EOS Estate Winery.

In 2005, Neil created the "Off the Strip Poker Tournament", which takes place in Las Vegas.

In 2007, Neil launched his own brand of tequila called Tres Rios. Neil debuted the tequila at the Food Network South Beach Wine & Food Festival in February 2007.

Neil opened Dr. Feelgood's Bar and Grill in West Palm Beach. It took over two and a half years for all of the members of Mötley Crüe to agree and sign off on the bar concept and location. It was finally determined that it would be located in downtown West Palm Beach, close to the ocean and within the high rent district of downtown. On January 19, 2008, Neil played a free concert on the streets of downtown West Palm Beach to celebrate the grand opening of Dr Feelgood's. In March 2009, Neil opened another Feelgood's in Miami Beach. Vince also owns a Feelgood's in Las Vegas.

In 2012, Vince Neil opened a strip club named Deja Vu Presents: Vince Neil's Girls Girls Girls in Las Vegas, Nevada.

In April 2014, Vince Neil, as the chief executive officer and chairman of RockStar Investment Group, along with long-time friends and business partners Bob Hewko and Mark Daniels, acquired ownership of the Arena Football League's Jacksonville Sharks in April 2014.

Neil was the owner of the Las Vegas Outlaws of the Arena Football League, but after 14 weeks of the season, the team was taken over by the league.

=== Television and film ===
In 1989, Neil had a small role for Police Academy 6: City Under Siege, which showed him being protected by Lieutenant Moses Hightower (Bubba Smith). The scene was filmed, but didn't make it into the final cut.

In 1990, Neil had a small part in the film The Adventures of Ford Fairlane playing Bobby Black, lead vocalist of the fictional rock band that consisted of Carlos Cavazo, Randy Castillo, and Phil Soussan. Opening sequences of the film featured the band playing at Red Rocks Amphitheatre, where Neil's character makes a grand entrance by swooping on stage via zip line.

In 2002, Neil was one of the cast members on the first season of The Surreal Life. In 2004, Neil appeared on the special Remaking Vince Neil, which showed him trying to recharge his solo career. He also recorded the single "Promise Me" produced by Desmond Child. The song was for sale on iTunes for a brief period, but a solo album never surfaced.

In 2004, Neil played a tattoo artist in an episode of the CBS sitcom Still Standing.

In 2009, Neil worked on a pilot for an A&E reality TV show. According to Neil, the program would follow him and his family after his parents moved in with him. As Neil told Eddie Trunk, "My wife [Lia] hasn't talked to my mom since the wedding", which took place January 9, 2005, in Las Vegas.

In 2010, he was cast on ABC's Skating with the Stars as a celebrity contestant who skated with professional ice skater Jennifer Wester.

In 2012, Neil participated in flight training in Henderson, Nevada for the PBS television series The Aviators, as reported by the Las Vegas Sun.

In 2017, Neil was a cast member on The New Celebrity Apprentice until his elimination in task 7.

== Personal life ==
=== Marriages and children ===
Neil has a son from his high school girlfriend, Tami Jones, named Neil Jason Wharton, born October 3, 1978.

Neil married his first wife, Beth Lynn, in 1981; they divorced in 1985. They had one daughter, Elizabeth Ashley Wharton, born October 29, 1983.

In April 1987, Neil married Sharise Ruddell, a mud wrestler and fashion model. The couple had one daughter, Skylar Lynnae Neil (March 26, 1991 – August 15, 1995), before divorcing in 1993.

In early 1993, he began dating actress and Playboy Playmate Heidi Mark after a blind date arranged by her makeup artist. The two were engaged within two months and married in 2000. After just 15 months of marriage and several attempts at reconciliation, they divorced in 2001.

Neil married his fourth wife, Lia Gerardini, in January 2005. The ceremony was officiated by MC Hammer, an ordained minister and fellow cast member on The Surreal Life. In 2010, Neil announced their separation.

=== Charity work ===
On August 15, 1995, Neil and Ruddell's daughter, Skylar Neil, died of cancer at the age of four. He founded the Skylar Neil Memorial Fund in her honor. Since that time, Neil and the foundation have raised awareness and funding for various children's illnesses. The Skylar Neil Memorial Foundation has donated millions of dollars to The T.J. Martell Foundation, and it sponsors an annual golf tournament to raise money for children with cancer. In mid-2011, Neil hosted a series of benefits called Rockin' the Red Carpet that benefitted Music for Relief as part of his tour with Mötley Crüe, Poison and the New York Dolls.

=== Legal issues ===
During the 1980s with Mötley Crüe's rising fame, Neil, along with his bandmates, was well known for using drugs, mostly cocaine, LSD, and heroin (which bandmate Nikki Sixx became addicted to). During an interview in 2015, Neil stated he had been using cocaine even before joining the band, and, like Sixx before him, became addicted to cocaine and heroin. Neil, as did his bandmates, went to rehab due to excessive usage of drugs.

In late 1984, Finnish hard rock band Hanoi Rocks was on their second American tour and their first to reach California. The two shows meant to be held in Los Angeles sold out in only twenty minutes. On the day they arrived in Los Angeles, December 8, Hanoi Rocks drummer Nicholas "Razzle" Dingley and the other members of the band (with the exception of singer Michael Monroe, who was recovering from a fractured ankle) visited Neil's home and spent the day in Redondo Beach. After partying for hours, Neil and Razzle decided to visit a local liquor store in Neil's De Tomaso Pantera. Neil, who was drunk, lost control of the car and hit an oncoming vehicle. The two occupants of the other car were seriously injured and suffered brain damage, and Dingley was killed. Neil was charged with vehicular manslaughter and driving under the influence of alcohol in connection with the crash. His blood alcohol content was 0.17, well above the California legal limit at that time of 0.10. In September 1985, Los Angeles County Superior Court Judge Edward Hinz Jr. sentenced Neil to 30 days in jail and five years' probation. Neil was ordered to pay $2.6 million in restitution to the victims of the crash and undertake 200 hours of community service. Neil was paroled for good behavior after serving 15 days in jail; Mötley Crüe dedicated their third studio album, Theatre of Pain, to Razzle.

Neil was arrested in 2002 for punching record producer Michael Schuman in a nightclub parking lot. He was ordered to pay restitution and undertake community service.

In 2003, Neil was arrested again after accusations that he assaulted a sex worker at the Moonlite BunnyRanch by grabbing her around the throat and throwing her against a wall. On April 9, 2004, he pleaded no contest to battery charges and he was sentenced to a 30-day jail suspension. He was ordered to undergo 60 days of anger management counseling and was fined $1,000 plus court fees of $132.

On December 15, 2004, an arrest warrant for misdemeanor assault was issued for Neil after a fight during a show on October 30 where he left a soundman unconscious for 45 seconds. Police had given the singer a criminal-trespass warning before he left the club and headed to Houston for a Halloween show.

In 2007, Neil was arrested for suspicion of DUI in Las Vegas after police spotted him making some erratic moves in his Ferrari. He later worked out a deal with prosecutors where he pleaded guilty to reckless driving in exchange for them to drop the DUI charge.

In June 2010, Neil was arrested on suspicion of drunk driving in Las Vegas after having allegedly smashed a fan's camera, and was released on $2,000 bond. On January 26, 2011, he pleaded guilty to drunk driving and was sentenced to 15 days in the Clark County jail along with 15 days under house arrest.

In March 2011, Neil was charged with battery and disorderly conduct after an altercation with ex-girlfriend Alicia Jacobs. On May 2, 2011, his attorneys pleaded not guilty on his behalf during an arraignment and he was ordered to stay away from Jacobs, then was scheduled to appear in court on August 8. On August 8, 2011, Neil's trial was rescheduled for November 7 due to an unexplained emergency.

In December 2015, Neil, along with Rockstar Investment Group president Mark Daniels and vice president Robert Hewko, were sued by Sohrob Farudi for fraud over a $500,000 investment towards the Las Vegas Outlaws arena football team. In an unrelated legal issue, Neil was also cited by the East Bay area of San Francisco for violating the daily water cap of 1,000 gallons after his home in Danville was discovered to have wasted over 2,200 gallons a day. Neil was fined $2 per gallon over the cap, totaling to over $150,000. He claimed on his Facebook page that he had not lived in that house for over five years.

In April 2016, Neil was charged with misdemeanor battery for assaulting a woman outside the Aria Resort and Casino in Las Vegas. Kelly Guerrero approached Neil for an autograph when he pulled her to the ground by her hair before actor Nicolas Cage restrained him. Neil pleaded guilty and struck a deal to receive six months' probation and was fined $1,000. Guerrero sued Neil for $150,000 for medical expenses, lost wages, and physical and emotional distress caused by the incident. In response, Neil demanded the case be thrown out, denying all allegations of wrongdoing and accusing Guerrero of seeking publicity. On December 10, 2018, Howard & Howard Attorneys, PLLC requested to file a lien against Neil after the singer refused to pay $187,364.01 in legal fees. On July 8, 2019, a Federal judge ordered Neil to pay Howard & Howard $170,169.56.

== Discography ==
=== Solo albums ===
Title	Release	Peak chart positions					
Title	Release	US	US Rock	US Hard Rock	US Indie	AUS	UK
Exposed	Release date: April 27, 1993; Label: Warner Bros.	13	—	—	—	84	44
Carved in Stone	Release date: September 12, 1995; Label: Warner Bros.	139	—	—	—	—	—
Tattoos & Tequila	Release date: June 22, 2010; Label: Eleven Seven	57	14	6	7	—	—

=== Live albums ===
- Live at the Whisky: One Night Only (2003)

=== with Mötley Crüe ===
- Too Fast for Love (1981)
- Shout at the Devil (1983)
- Theatre of Pain (1985)
- Girls, Girls, Girls (1987)
- Dr. Feelgood (1989)
- Generation Swine (1997)
- New Tattoo (2000)
- Saints of Los Angeles (2008)

=== Solo singles ===
Title	Year	Peak chart positions			Album
Title	Year	US Main. Rock	AUS	UK	Album
"You're Invited (But Your Friend Can't Come)"	1992	17	74	63	Exposed
"Sister of Pain"	1993	12	135	—	Exposed
"Can't Change Me"	1993	—	—	—	Exposed
"Can't Have Your Cake"	1993	34	—	—	Exposed
"Skylar's Song"	1995	—	—	—	Carved in Stone
"The Crawl"	1995	—	—	—	Carved in Stone
"Promise Me"	2005	—	—	—	non-album single
"Tattoos and Tequila"	2010	36	—	—	Tattoos & Tequila
"—" denotes a recording that did not chart.

=== Guest singles ===
Title	Release	Peak chart positions		Album
Title	Release	US Country	US Country Airplay	Album
"Chip Away the Stone" (featuring Blues Saraceno, Ricky Phillips, Paul Taylor, Pat Torpey)	1999	-	-	Not the Same Old Song and Dance: A Tribute to Aerosmith
"Cold Ethyl" (featuring Mick Mars, Bob Kulick, Billy Sheehan, Simon Phillips)	1999	-	-	Humanary Stew: A Tribute to Alice Cooper
"Paranoid" (featuring George Lynch, Stuart Hamm, Gregg Bissonette)	2004	-	-	Evil Lives: A True Metal Tribute to Black Sabbath
"Home Sweet Home" (Justin Moore featuring Vince Neil)	2014	28	30	Nashville Outlaws: A Tribute to Mötley Crüe

== Motorsport career ==
Neil pursued a part-time career in Motorsport via Indy Lights during the 1992 season with P.I.G. Racing. He started four races finishing three of them and all point scoring positions. That same year, he also took part in the celebrity race at the Gold Coast Indycar event. He has also been a participant in the Toyota Pro/Celebrity Race.

=== Complete Indy Lights results ===
Year	Team	1	2	3	4	5	6	7	8	9	10	11	12	Rank	Points
1992	P.I.G. Racing	PHX; 12	LBH; 17	DET	POR; 12	MIL; 10	NHA	TOR	CLE	VAN	MDO	NAZ	LS	23rd	5

== See also ==
- List of celebrities who own wineries and vineyards
- Dude (Looks Like a Lady)
