= The Amsterdam Kill =

1977 Hong Kong-American film by Robert Clouse

- UK DVD cover

Chinese name
- Traditional Chinese: 荷京喋血
- Simplified Chinese: 荷京喋血
- Literal meaning: Bloodshed in Holland
Transcriptions
Standard Mandarin
- Hanyu Pinyin: Héjīng diéxuè
Yue: Cantonese
- Jyutping: Ho^{4}ging^{1} Dip^{6}hyut^{3}
- Directed by: Robert Clouse
- Written by: Robert Clouse; Gregory Teifer
- Produced by: Andre Morgan
- Starring: Robert Mitchum; Richard Egan; Leslie Nielsen; Bradford Dillman; Keye Luke
- Cinematography: Alan Hume
- Edited by: Gina Brown; Allan Holzman
- Music by: Hal Schaefer
- Production company: Golden Harvest; Fantastic Films
- Distributed by: Golden Harvest (HK); Columbia Pictures (US)
- Release dates: 26 December 1977 (Denmark); 23 February 1978 (HK); 3 March 1978 (US)
- Running time: 90 minutes
- Countries: Hong Kong; United States
- Language: English

The Amsterdam Kill (Chinese: 荷京喋血; lit. 'Bloodshed in Holland') is a 1977 action thriller film directed and co-written by Robert Clouse, and produced by Andre Morgan for Golden Harvest. It stars Robert Mitchum, Richard Egan, Leslie Nielsen, Bradford Dillman and Keye Luke. Mitchum portrays an disgraced ex-DEA agent who is hired to takedown an international drug cartel.

== Plot ==
Former DEA Agent Quinlan, removed from the force some years earlier for stealing confiscated drug money, is hired by Chung Wei, a leader in the Amsterdam drug cartel, who wants out of the business. Quinlan's job is to use Chung's information to tip DEA agents to drug busts, thereby destroying the cartel. But when the first two "tips" go awry, resulting in murdered DEA officers, the feds must decide whether to trust Quinlan further.

== Cast ==
- Robert Mitchum as Quinlan
- Richard Egan as Ridgeway
- Leslie Nielsen as Riley Knight
- Bradford Dillman as Howard Odums
- Keye Luke as Chung Wei
- George Cheung as Jimmy Wong
- Stephen Leung as Paul Fon
- Callan Leung as Inspector Lau
- Chan Sing as Hitman
- Yuen Biao, Lam Ching-ying, Yuen Wah, and Mars as thugs

== Production ==
The Amsterdam Kill was the second of seven films American director Robert Clouse made for Hong Kong studio Golden Harvest, beginning with 1973's Enter the Dragon. Filming took place on-location in Hong Kong, Amsterdam, Utrecht, and London. Sammo Hung was the film's action choreographer.

== Release ==
The film was first released in Denmark on December 26, 1977. It premiered in Hong Kong on February 23, 1978, and was released in the United States by Golden Harvest on March 3.

=== Home media ===
The Amsterdam Kill is set to make its Blu-Ray debut by 88 Films in the UK, in April 2026.

== Reception ==
=== Critical response ===
Janet Maslin of The New York Times said the film "... has all the weariness of a genre movie but none of the comfortable familiarity. In a misguided attempt to appeal to an international audience, the film flits from London to Hong Kong to Amsterdam. ... There are so many shots of airports and train terminals that it begins to seem as if one has purchased a Eurail pass rather than a movie ticket. The film is so intent on taking place everywhere that its nervous geography becomes terribly jarring."
