= Pinocchio (1968 film) =

- Based on: The Adventures of Pinocchio by Carlo Collodi
- Written by: Ernest Kinoy
- Starring: Peter Noone; Burl Ives

Original release
- Network: NBC
- Release: December 8, 1968

Pinocchio is a 90-minute musical television film adaptation of Carlo Collodi's classic 1883 book. It aired on NBC on December 8, 1968, as part of the Hallmark Hall of Fame series. In the UK, it aired on BBC1 on Boxing Day 1969.

Peter Noone, lead singer of Herman's Hermits, played Pinocchio and Burl Ives was cast as Mister Geppetto. Walter Marks wrote the songs, and the script was adapted by Ernest Kinoy.

== Cast ==
- Burl Ives — Geppetto
- Peter Noone — Pinocchio
- Anita Gillette — Blue Fairy
- Mort Marshall — Cat
- Jack Fletcher — Fox
- Ned Wertimer — Farmer/Vito Whale
- Charlotte Rae — Rosa Whale
- Pierre Epstein — Weasel
- James Beard - Coachman
- John Miranda - Clerk
- Edwin Steffe - Schoolmaster

== Production ==
Before filming began, Geppetto was initially to be portrayed by Art Carney.

Pinocchio was recorded on videotape at NBC's Brooklyn Studio.

Noone was fitted with a fake nose that initially was problematic for the production staff. Richard Lewine, the show's producer, described the problem to TV Guide:

"Since we didn't want to cheat the audience out of seeing it grow, we hired Bil Baird to create one. Bil stood behind Pinocchio, out of camera range, holding the end of a rod that attached to the nose. When he pushed the rod, the nose, made from expandable material, lengthened. It worked beautifully," Lewine said.

"But when we went on camera, we discovered that you could see the separation between the fake nose and Peter's real one. Two hours of work with the make-up man solved the problem, but it was worrisome," he said.

== Broadcast ==
NBC aired the special on Sunday, December 8, 1968, at 7 p.m. Eastern Standard Time. It pre-empted two regular shows on NBC's schedule, The New Adventures of Huckleberry Finn and Walt Disney's Wonderful World of Color.

== Songs ==
- "Chip Off The Old Block"
- "Wonderful World, Hello"
- "Beautiful People"
- "Little Bad Habits"
- "Walk With Him"
- "You Could Get To Like It"
- "It's A Dog's Life"
- "Too Soon"
