= Richard O'Brien (American actor) =

American film and television actor

- Born: Edward Patrick O'Brien; July 14, 1917; Fargo, North Dakota, U.S.
- Died: March 29, 1983 (aged 65); Los Angeles, California, U.S.
- Occupation: Actor

Edward Patrick O'Brien (July 14, 1917 – March 29, 1983) was an American film and television actor.

== Early life ==
O'Brien was born in Fargo, North Dakota. He worked as a radio announcer in North Dakota before moving to Hollywood in the 1930s. He began appearing in films, and also worked as a manager at the Carthay Circle Theatre. During World War II he gave up acting to work as a stevedore in the San Francisco docks.

== Career ==
O'Brien began his screen career in 1957, making three appearances in Harbor Command.

O'Brien had recurring television roles on The Smith Family (1971–72) and the action, crime drama series S.W.A.T (1975–1976). He also guest starred on Rawhide (1965), The Big Valley (1965–1969), The Fugitive (1966), 12 O'Clock High (1966), The Wild Wild West (1968–1969), Gunsmoke (1969–1974), Bonanza (1971), My Three Sons (1971), Cannon (1971–1976), The Streets of San Francisco (1972, 1975), Barnaby Jones (1974, 1977), The Rockford Files (1977), Quincy, M.E. (1978–1981), Trapper John, M.D. (1980, 1982), and General Hospital.

O'Brien appeared in films such as Chamber of Horrors (1966), Rough Night in Jericho (1967), Pieces of Dreams (1970), The Andromeda Strain (1971), The Honkers (1972), The Thief Who Came to Dinner (1973), No Deposit, No Return (1976), High Velocity (1976), The Pack (1977), and Looking for Mr. Goodbar (1977).

== Death ==
O'Brien died in March 1983 of cancer at his home in Los Angeles, California, at the age of 65.

== Filmography ==
=== Film ===
Richard O'Brien film credits
Year	Title	Role	Notes
1962	Days of Wine and Roses	Unknown	Uncredited
1964	A Tiger Walks	Camper in Tent	Uncredited
1966	Chamber of Horrors	Dr. Romulus Cobb	
1967	Rough Night in Jericho	Ryan	
1968	Madigan	Det. O'Brien	
1970	Pieces of Dreams	Monsignor Francis Hurley	
1971	The Andromeda Strain	Grimes	
1972	The Loners	Driver	
1972	The Honkers	Matt Weber	
1973	The Thief Who Came to Dinner	Sgt. Del Conte	
1974	Nightmare Honeymoon	Sheriff	
1976	No Deposit, No Return	Capt. Boland	
1976	Moving Violation	Police Chief	
1976	High Velocity	Beaumont	
1976	The Shaggy D.A.	Desk Sergeant	
1977	Looking for Mr. Goodbar	Father Timothy	
1977	The Pack	Jim Dodge	
1978	Heaven Can Wait	Advisor to Former Owner	

=== Television ===
Richard O'Brien television credits
Year	Title	Role	Notes	Ref.
1957–1958	Harbor Command	Capt. Hardesty / Ed White / Jackie	3 episodes (as Edward O'Brien)	
1965	Dr. Kildare	Mr. Beaton	1 episode	
1965	Rawhide	Sheriff	1 episode	
1965–1968	The Man From U.N.C.L.E.	Fauntleroy / Air Chief	3 episodes	
1965–1969	The Big Valley	Bryce / Yankee / Jace Holman / Jed Cameron / Sheriff Mosley / Sheriff Dan Bannock	6 episodes	
1966	The Fugitive	Macklin / Sheriff Sam	2 episodes	
1966	12 O'Clock High	Sergeant / C.O.	2 episodes	
1967	The Monkees	Mr. Smith	Episode: "Monkees on the Line" (S1.E28)	
1967, 1968	Cimarron Strip	Ben Lorton / Chandler	2 episodes	
1968–1969	The Wild Wild West	Sheriff Tenny / Sergeant Charlie Tobin / Mr. Van Cleve	3 episodes	
1969	Family Affair	Harris	1 episode	
1969–1974	Gunsmoke	Simpson / Carter / Adam Kearney	3 episodes	
1970	Dan August	Marston	1 episode	
1971	My Three Sons	Tom Stratman	1 episode	
1971	Bonanza	Tom Griswold	1 episode	
1971	Dead Men Tell No Tales	Tim Riley	TV movie	
1971–1972	The Smith Family	Captain O'Farrell	11 episodes	
1971–1976	Cannon	Charlie Clausen / Chief Michael Ames / Herb Landon / Capt. Mike Carling	4 episodes	
1972, 1975	The Streets of San Francisco	Barney Reardon / Carl Hendrix	2 episodes	
1973	The Waltons	Charlie Potter	1 episode	
1974	Movin' On	Construction Boss	Episode: In Tandem	
1974–1977	Barnaby Jones	Sheriff / Joe Montgomery	3 episodes	
1975	Returning Home	Mr. Cameron	TV movie	
1975	The Rookies	Stark / Officer Lord	2 episodes	
1975	Kojak	Sgt. Harry Doyle	1 episode	
1975–1976	S.W.A.T.	Chief Edward Roman	Recurring role	
1977	Wonder Woman	Frank Wilson	1 episode	
1977	The Rockford Files	Arthur Kelso	Episode: "The Mayor's Committee from Deer Lick Falls" (S4.E9)	
1977	Little House on the Prairie	Hugh MacGregor	1 episode	
1978–1981	Quincy, M.E.	Bernie / Fourth Board Member (uncredited) / Senator McGreevy	3 episodes	
1980, 1982	Trapper John, M.D.	Construction Worker / Super	2 episodes	
