= The Ultimate Warrior (film) =

1975 film

- Directed by: Robert Clouse
- Written by: Robert Clouse
- Produced by: Fred Weintraub; Paul Heller
- Starring: Yul Brynner; Max von Sydow; Joanna Miles; Richard Kelton; Lane Bradbury; William Smith
- Cinematography: Gerald Hirschfeld
- Edited by: Michael Kahn
- Music by: Gil Melle
- Distributed by: Warner Bros. Pictures
- Release date: October 29, 1975
- Running time: 94 minutes
- Country: United States
- Language: English
- Budget: $800,000
- Box office: $9,000,000

The Ultimate Warrior is a 1975 American post-apocalyptic science fiction action-adventure film directed by Robert Clouse. One of a series of post-apocalyptic films from the 1960s and 1970s, it is set in post-civilization New York City in 2012 and depicts the struggles of a small enclave of inhabitants attempting to survive in a compound beset with packs of starving pillagers.

== Plot synopsis ==
In 2012 following a global pandemic which devastates the population, Baron, the leader of a tribe of survivors, has established a small fortified area in the ruins of New York City. Cal, a former scientist and a member of Baron's tribe, has developed plague-resistant seeds that enable the tribe to grow vegetables in the barren soil. The tribe's small garden has become an oasis in the ruined city, coveted by the packs of starving, lawless gangs outside.

Needing to increase security against the raiders, especially a gang led by Carrot, Baron recruits a deadly warrior named Carson, who has put his skills out for hire. Carson agrees to help, but tells the Baron that it can be only for a limited time. Carson is on his way to a small island off the coast of North Carolina, where he believes he may have family.

While Carson's presence has some of the desired effect, Carrot continues his raids, one of which claims the life of Cal. The Baron comes to realize that the only hope for his pregnant daughter Melinda and his unborn grandchild, is for them to leave the city. He asks Carson to take Melinda, along with some of Cal's seeds, and establish a new society on the island of which Carson had told him.

Carson and Melinda escape from the city via the subway system, with Carrot in pursuit. The Baron remains behind, where he is killed by members of his own tribe, who believe he has betrayed them when they discover that Carson and Melinda have gone.

Carson delivers Melinda's baby, then engages in a fight with Carrot and his gang. Carson kills Carrot and most of his followers, but loses his hand. He gets Melinda and the precious seeds out of the city.

== Cast ==
- Yul Brynner as Carson
- Max von Sydow as Baron
- Joanna Miles as Melinda
- William Smith as "Carrot"
- Richard Kelton as Cal
- Darrell Zwerling as Silas
- Gary Johnson as L. Harkness
- Lane Bradbury as Barrie
- Mel Novak as Lippert
- Mickey Caruso as B. Harkness
- Nate Esformes as Garon
- Stephen McHattie as Robert
- Henry Kingi as Carrot's Man

== Production ==
The film was shot on the Warner Bros. Pictures back lot and the MGM lot with no location shooting other than the final (beach) scene. Director Robert Clouse was deaf and relied on his assistant directors to make sure the dialog was delivered effectively. Shooting with a budget just under a million dollars, Clouse was limited when it came to the use of visual effects and matte paintings for the production. The film returned nearly $9 million in rentals.

== Release ==
The Ultimate Warrior was released on DVD by Warner Home Video on 7/29/08, as a Best Buy exclusive double feature with Battle Beneath the Earth.ISBN 1-4198-6943-4, UPC# 883929023790.

== See also ==
- List of American films of 1975
- Survival film, about the film genre, with a list of related films
