= Hal Schaefer =

American jazz musician and vocal coach (1925–2012)

- Born: Harold Herman Schaefer; July 22, 1925; New York City, U.S.
- Died: December 8, 2012 (aged 87) Fort Lauderdale, Florida, U.S.
- Genres: Jazz
- Occupations: Musician; vocal coach
- Instrument: Piano
- Years active: 1950s–2000s

Harold Herman "Hal" Schaefer (22 July 1925 – 8 December 2012) was an American jazz pianist and vocal coach. He coached Marilyn Monroe, Mitzi Gaynor, Judy Garland, Robert Wagner, Jane Russell, and Barbra Streisand, in films and musical comedy songs, and composed the film scores to The Money Trap (1965) and The Amsterdam Kill (1977). Schaefer was a pianist in Benny Carter's group, including performing as a pianist in Harry James and Boyd Raeburn's jazz groups and for Peggy Lee and Billy Eckstine. During his career he helped many directors and producers such as Howard Hawks, Harold Prince, and George Cukor.

In 2009, Schaefer was nominated by Michael Feinstein for the Best Latin Jazz Award and also for the NEA Jazz Masters. He never left the music industry. Schaefer once performed a musical piece for Eleanor Roosevelt and sang at the United Nations' anniversary in 1955. He moved to Florida in the 1990s and continued to teach voice lessons to students until his death.

== Discography ==
=== Albums ===
Date	Title	Label
1956	The RCA Victor Jazz Workshop	RCA Victor
1959	Ten Shades of Blue	United Artists
1976	The Extraordinary Jazz Pianist	Renaissance
1992	Solo Duo Trio	Discovery
2011	Brilliant!	Summit
2015	Jazz Goes to the Movies / Showcase: Great Songs from United Artists Pictures	Fresh Sound
