= The Pack (1977 film) =

1977 film by Robert Clouse

- Theatrical poster
- Directed by: Robert Clouse
- Screenplay by: Robert Clouse
- Based on: The Pack by David Fisher
- Produced by: Fred Weintraub
- Starring: Joe Don Baker; Hope Alexander-Willis; Richard B. Shull; R. G. Armstrong; Ned Wertimer; Richard O'Brien; Bibi Besch; Delos V. Smith Jr. Sherry Miles; Paul Willson
- Cinematography: Ralph Woolsey
- Edited by: Peter E. Berger
- Music by: Lee Holdridge
- Production company: Sequoia Pictures
- Distributed by: Warner Bros. Pictures
- Release date: November 18, 1977
- Running time: 95 minutes
- Country: United States
- Language: English
- Budget: $2 million
- Box office: $2.4 million

The Pack is a 1977 American horror film directed by Robert Clouse about a pack of abandoned dogs who turn against humans by killing them for food at Seal Island.

== Plot ==
The movie opens with a horse grazing in the middle of a forest. He is alerted by an unknown presence stalking him, which causes him to gallop for the protection of the trees. He is followed by some unknown enemies who are chasing him, before they surround him, and prepare to attack.

Meanwhile, a boy and his parents leave their dog behind, believing it will be better than taking him to the dog pound. Later that day, he is found by a pack of feral dogs, most of whom were abandoned pets. Their leader, a massive golden-haired mongrel, immediately accepts the dog into their pack.

Jerry has moved to Seal Island with his new wife, Millie, and their two sons. They also brought along their family dog, a German Shepherd, named Riley. While going to the island junkyard, Jerry's dog chases after a rabbit into the trees, but is attacked by an unknown creature. When Jerry goes back to see what it was that attacked Riley, he discovered that it was a feral dog. He immediately communicated with other residents on the island, including the old hermit Mr. McMinnimee, to keep a watchful eye out for that dog and kill it if they ever see it again.

McMinnimee, who lives in a cabin alone with his German Shepherd Zsa Zsa, soon learns of the wild dog and returns to his home. When a storm hit the island, Zsa Zsa is startled and tries to break out. Armed with his rifle, the old man opens the door to his cabin to see who is intruding onto his property. Zsa Zsa bolts out into the front yard, but is suddenly attacked by the golden-haired mongrel and several other feral dogs.

McMinnimee is too late to save his dog from the pack, though he manages to shoot and kill one of the pack members, but the dogs won't stop until they eat their kill. As he tries to secure the doors and windows to his house, the dogs break through one of the windows and begin eating the old man alive.

The following morning, while relaxing in her new house, Millie notices that something is spooking their poultry. She goes outside and discovers the same mongrel that Jerry saw the other day is lurking near the poultry yard. Millie tries to drive it off, but the dog growls at her and attacks, forcing Millie to seek refuge in her Volkswagen.

As the rest of the pack surround the car seeking a way to break in, Jerry arrives and drives the dogs off, killing a Labrador Retriever with his shotgun. He takes Millie to town, drops her off at one of the abandoned houses, and warns his neighbor Hardiman about the pack. While Hardiman leaves to warn the other islanders, Jerry picks up his sons and takes them back to the house.

Meanwhile, Jim Dodge moves to the island with his son, Tommy, his wife, Marge, and their cook, Lois. The day after their arrival, Dodge urges Tommy and Lois to go for a walk. During their walk through the forest, Tommy hears the pack of dogs howling nearby. He starts running for his life. Lois runs after Tommy, but quickly loses him and is forced to seek refuge in an abandoned barn where the dogs sleep. Tommy runs through the forest with the pack in close pursuit. He soon finds himself at the edge of a cliff towering over the ocean. With the dogs closing in, Tommy jumps to his death from the cliff.

Lois seeks refuge in the abandoned barn just as a storm hits the island. She lays down in one of the stalls and soon falls asleep. Soon she wakes up to discover the dogs have returned. The dogs growl menacingly and launch an attack on her which ends with the dogs eating her.

Meanwhile, Jerry and Hardiman manage to warn Walker, Dodge and Marge about the dogs roaming the island and bring them back to the house. But when Jerry arrives at McMinnimee's cabin to warn him, he believes something is wrong when the old man does not respond. He then discovers the dead bodies of Zsa Zsa and the collie. After searching the side of the cabin, he finds inside what's left of the old man's lifeless body, having already been mauled and devoured by the pack. Jerry then leaves McMinnimee's cabin, just managing to avoid the pack who had been stalking him. He returns to the house and tells the others of what had happened. He even states that most of the dogs were once tourists' pets, but were abandoned to survive on the island a few weeks earlier. Concerned and outraged that his son Tommy is still out lost on the island, Dodge persuades Jerry to find him. Jerry, accompanied by Dodge and Hardiman, head out to the abandoned barn and find the dogs running away. Dodge, armed with a rifle, shoots and kills a Dalmatian as the pack runs off. Inside the barn, the men find Lois' mangled body lying in a corner, but do not find Tommy.

Believing that his son is dead, Dodge steals Jerry's Jeep and drives off in pursuit of the dogs, with Jerry and Hardiman following him in Hardiman's truck. Dodge soon encounters the pack near one of the abandoned houses, but before he can even shoot at them, the leader of the pack bites and tears off his hands holding his gun, ensuring he can't fight back. The pack attacks him, tearing him to shreds, and begins to eat him. Jerry and Hardiman soon find Dodge and drive off the dogs with their truck, but Dodge succumbs to his injuries and dies the next day. After failing to send a signal out to the Coast Guard on the radio, Jerry orders Millie, Walker and Hardiman to find whatever weapons they can use against the pack, but the only weapons they can find are Jerry's shotgun and a handful of cartridges, a couple of sticks, an umbrella and a few knives.

Later that same day, Jerry, his family, and the few remaining inhabitants find themselves under siege by the pack. Later that afternoon, the mongrel and four other dogs from the pack launch an attack on the house, trying to break in through the windows. Jerry, Millie, their sons, and Hardiman struggle to hold them off. Two of the dogs, a Doberman Pinscher and an Irish Setter, manage to break inside the house, but Jerry kills the Setter with his shotgun and Walker and Jerry's dog Riley drive the Doberman out of the house. The rest of the dogs flee after failing to break through the windows.

Realizing that the dogs will return for another assault, Jerry tells his family, Marge, Hardiman and Walker to board up the windows and doors of the house. Later that night, the group carries Dodge's body down to the docks and place him in a boat, pushing it out to sea to prevent the pack from trying to get to it. Knowing that the dogs will be back, they quickly return to the house and lock themselves inside.

The following morning, Walker wakes up and hears the sound of a motorboat near the docks. He grabs Jerry's shotgun and runs down to the docks to find a small group of people in a motorboat several yards out at sea. He fires a shot in the air, trying to signal them to land at the docks, but the people believe he is messing around and they laugh and drive away. Walker turns around, only to find the dogs standing in his way. He fights them off with the gun, but the mongrel and two other dogs quickly overpower him and knock him off the deck into the water.

Meanwhile, Jerry, having heard the sound of the shotgun being fired and realizing that Walker has headed down to the docks, takes his Jeep and drives down there, only to find him surrounded by the pack. As Jerry drives his vehicle onto the dock, the dogs turn their attention towards Jerry and charge him. The moving Jeep runs over the majority of the pack, killing a gray terrier mongrel and forcing the rest of the dogs to retreat into the forest. Jerry pulls Walker out of the water and drives him back to the house.

Tired of waiting for help, Jerry orders Millie to take Marge, Riley, Walker and their sons out to the docks, while he and Hardiman will try to finish off the pack. While Hardiman waits quietly in Jerry's Jeep, Jerry lures the mongrel and the remainder of his pack into the house. As soon as the dogs are all inside, Hardiman closes the door behind them, pours several bucketloads of gasoline on the walls and sets the house on fire with a torch. Jerry then climbs up the ladder to the attic and tries to raise it to prevent the dogs from following him, but the mongrel leaps on top of the ladder and manages to reach the top. Jerry holds him off for a short while, but as the flames reach the floor of the attic, he pushes the dog back and jumps through a window, sliding off the roof and landing on the grass below. The mongrel leaps out of the same window and springs at Jerry, but he misses and is impaled on the sharpened end of a broken pipe.

Millie and the others return to the house and watch as the burning building explodes and collapses, killing all of the dogs inside. They soon discover that one of the dogs, the same dog that was abandoned and had joined the pack a few days earlier, apparently did not join the fate of his comrades because the rope he was tied to had been caught and tangled in a heavy branch. Realizing that the dog was apparently afraid and not as savage and aggressive as the other dogs, Jerry decides to try to tame it. Using some crackers, he feeds them one by one to the dog. The film ends as the dog starts licking Jerry's hand, apparently winning the trust of the man and becoming a pet again.

== Cast ==
- Joe Don Baker as Jerry
- Hope Alexander-Willis as Millie
- Richard B. Shull as Hardiman
- R.G. Armstrong as Cobb
- Ned Wertimer as Walker
- Richard O'Brien as Jim Dodge
- Bibi Besch as Marge Dodge
- Delos V. Smith Jr. as Mr. McMinnimee
- Paul Willson as Tommy Dodge
- Sherry E. DeBoer as Lois

== Release ==
The film was released theatrically in the United States by Warner Bros. Pictures on November 18, 1977.

The film was released on VHS by Warner Home Video in 1983. As of 2012, the film is available on MOD (Manufacture on Demand) DVD. Scream Factory released the film on Blu-ray on September 12, 2023.

== Reception ==
Critical reception for The Pack has been mixed to negative. TV Guide awarded the film 2 out of 4 stars, calling it "A cut above the usual exploitative revenge-of-nature films", but criticizing the cataclysmic climax. Variety gave the film a positive review, writing "The Pack is a well-made and discreetly violent story of a pack of wild dogs menacing residents of a remote island." Leonard Maltin awarded the film 2 1/2 out of a possible 4 stars, calling it "predictable" but noted that the film was well made.
