= Ned Wertimer =

American actor (1923–2013)

- Wertimer as Ralph Hart on The Jeffersons
- Born: October 27, 1923; Buffalo, New York, U.S.
- Died: January 2, 2013 (aged 89); Valley Village, Los Angeles, California, U.S.
- Education: Bachelor of Business Administration
- Alma mater: University of Pennsylvania's Wharton School of Business
- Occupation: Actor
- Years active: 1950–2007
- Known for: Ralph Hart, the doorman on The Jeffersons
- Spouse: Skyne Uku-Wertimer (m. 1971)

Edward "Ned" Wertimer (October 27, 1923 – January 2, 2013) was an American actor. He was best known for his role as Ralph Hart, the doorman on the sitcom The Jeffersons.

== Life and career ==
=== Early years ===
Wertimer was born on October 27, 1923, in Buffalo, New York. He served as a Navy pilot in World War II, and later received a Bachelor of Business Administration degree from University of Pennsylvania's Wharton School. While at the school, he became a member of its Mask and Wig Club, an all-male comedy and musical troupe. He was also a member of the fraternity of Phi Gamma Delta.

=== Theater, television, and film ===
After graduating college, Wertimer went to New York City to perform Broadway theatre in such shows as Texas Li'l Darlin', a 1949 musical by Robert E. Dolan and Johnny Mercer; 1950's The Live Wire by Garson Kanin; 1950's The Disenchanted, by Budd Schulberg, with Jason Robards; and 1963's All in Good Time by Bill Naughton. He also began performing in small roles in television, a new medium at the time. He was able to show his improvisational skills as a regular guest on The Shari Lewis Show.

In the mid-1960s, Wertimer moved to Los Angeles to continue his burgeoning television career. He had over 100 guest-star credits on such shows as Gunsmoke, McMillan & Wife, Car 54, Where Are You?, The Debbie Reynolds Show, Hogan's Heroes, The Mary Tyler Moore Show, A Touch of Grace, WKRP in Cincinnati, Mork & Mindy, He & She, Family Law and Happy Days. He also appeared in such films as Mame, Santa Claus Conquers the Martians, The Impossible Years, Pinocchio, The Strongest Man in the World, The Pack and Pirates of the Caribbean: At World's End. He had a role in the 1970 film C.C. and Company.

He was a longtime member of the performers' trade unions—Screen Actors Guild and American Federation of Television and Radio Artists, which merged in 2012.

==== The Jeffersons ====
Wertimer appeared as doorman Ralph Hart in a 1975 All in the Family episode titled "The Jeffersons Move on Up", which was the pilot for the spin-off series The Jeffersons. The Hart character carried over and Wertimer appeared as the doorman (in 57 of the series' 253 episodes) who always sought a gratuity for his services.

== Personal life and death ==
Wertimer loved traveling around the world, from riding a camel in Egypt to riding an elephant in Thailand to swimming in Australia's Great Barrier Reef. In addition to his performers' union work, Wertimer was also a voting member for the Academy of Television Arts & Sciences' Emmy Awards. Soon after moving to California in the mid-1960s, he met and married Dr. Skyne Uku, professor emeritus at California State University, Long Beach.

Wertimer died on January 2, 2013, at the Sherman Village Health Care Center in Los Angeles, at the age of 89. According to his manager, Wertimer had never recovered from a fall at his Burbank, California, home in November 2012.

== Filmography ==
| Year | Title | Role | Notes |
|---|---|---|---|
| 1958 | Let's Rock | Studio Manager | Uncredited |
| 1964 | Santa Claus Conquers the Martians | Andy Henderson | |
| 1968 | What's So Bad About Feeling Good? | Marshall legal aide | Uncredited |
| 1968 | The Impossible Years | Dr. Bodey | |
| 1968 | Pinocchio | Vito Whale / Farmer | TV movie |
| 1969 | Some Kind of a Nut | Larry | Uncredited |
| 1970 | C.C. and Company | Motorcycle Salesman | |
| 1972 | Bad Company | Mr. Dixon | |
| 1974 | Mame | Fred Kates | |
| 1975 | The Strongest Man in the World | Mr. Parsons | |
| 1975 | At Long Last Love | First Man (Nightclub) | |
| 1977 | The Pack | Walker | |
| 1979 | Hometown U.S.A. | Mr. Duckworth | |
| 2007 | Pirates of the Caribbean: At World's End | Singing Gallows Pirate #6 | (final film role) |
