= Whisky a Go Go =

Nightclub in West Hollywood, California

- "The Whisky"
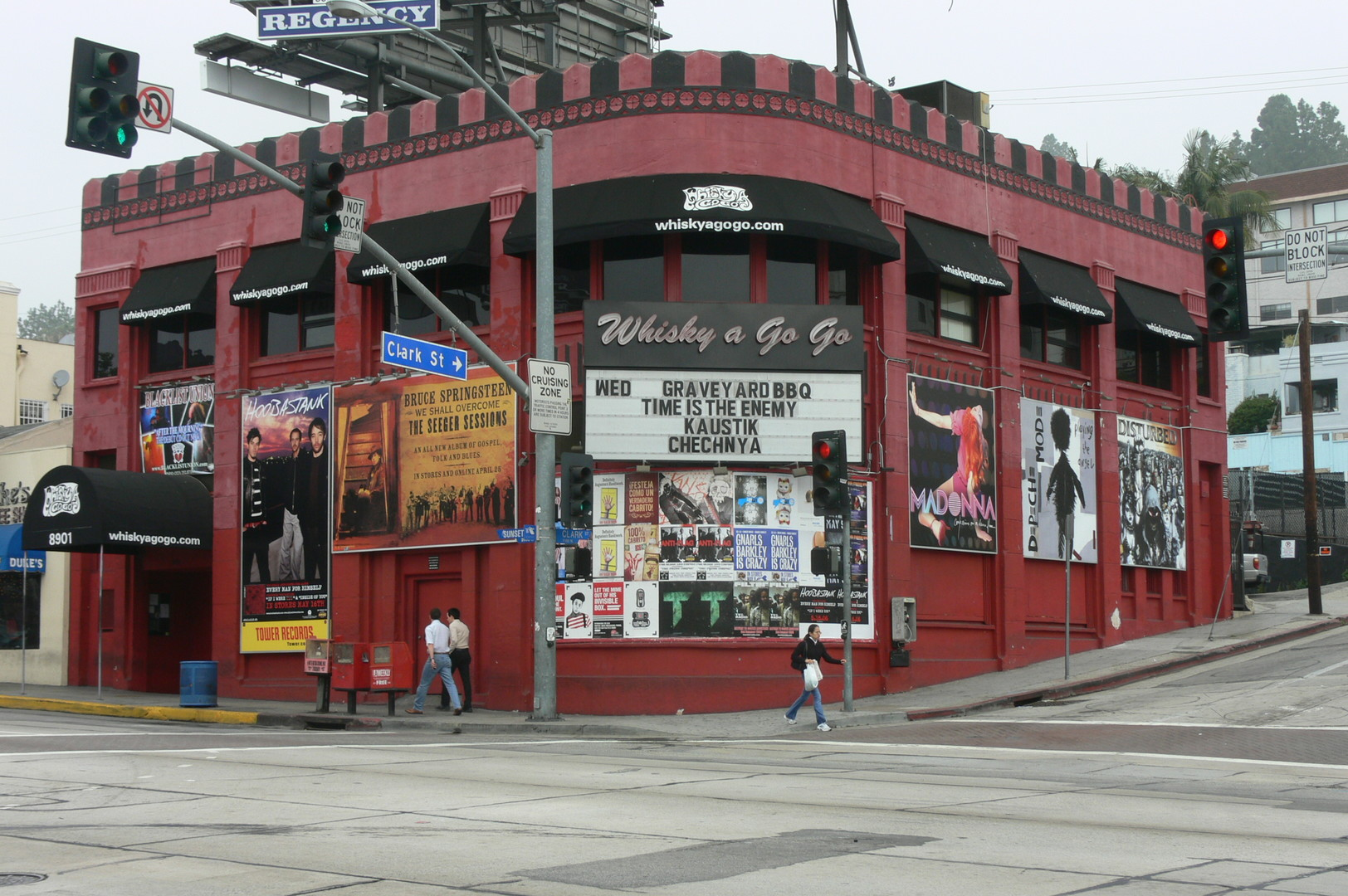
- The Whisky a Go Go on the Sunset Strip in 2006
- Interactive map of Whisky a Go Go
- Address: 8901 Sunset Blvd
- Location: West Hollywood, California 90069
- Coordinates: 34°5′26″N 118°23′8″W
- Capacity: 500
- Type: Nightclub

Construction
- Opened: January 16, 1964

Website
- whiskyagogo.com

The Whisky a Go Go (informally nicknamed The Whisky) is a historic nightclub in West Hollywood, California, United States. It is located at 8901 Sunset Boulevard on the Sunset Strip, corner North Clark Street, opposite North San Vicente Boulevard, northwest corner. The club played a central role in the Los Angeles music scene from the 1960s through the 1990s.

== History ==
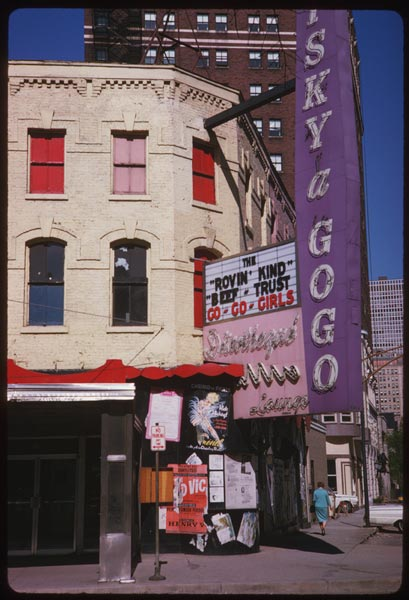
Whisky a Go Go, in 1966, at Rush and Chestnut streets in Chicago

In 1958, the first Whisky a Go Go in the United States opened in Chicago, Illinois, on the corner of Rush and Chestnut streets. It has been called the first real American discothèque. A franchise was opened in 1966 on M Street in the Georgetown section of Washington, D.C., by restaurateur Jacques Vivien.

It owes its name to the first discothèque, the Whisky à Gogo, (à gogo, meaning, in French, "in abundance", "galore"), established in Paris in 1947 by Paul Pacini (d. 2017), which itself took the name from the movie Whisky Galore! based on the British novel Whisky Galore which was released in France as Whisky a Gogo.

The Sunset Strip Whisky was founded by Elmer Valentine, Phil Tanzini, Shelly Davis, and attorney Theodore Flier and opened on January 16, 1964. In 1966, Valentine, Lou Adler, and others founded The Roxy Theatre. In 1972, Valentine, Adler, Mario Maglieri and others started the Rainbow Bar & Grill on the Sunset Strip. Lou Adler bought into the Whisky in the late 1970s. Valentine sold his interest in the Whisky a Go Go in the 1990s but retained an ownership in the Rainbow Bar & Grill and the Roxy Theatre until his death in December 2008.

Although the club was billed as a discothèque, suggesting that it offered only recorded music, the Whisky a Go Go opened with a live band led by Johnny Rivers and DJ Rhonda Lane, spinning records between sets from a suspended cage at the right of the stage. Shortly after opening, the club began booking live rock groups upon suggestion from their publicist, Ronnie Haran. Haran eventually hired The Doors as the Whisky house band, where they performed seven nights a week. In September 1969, the group Gypsy took over as the house band at the club until April 1971.

Early Whisky matchbox. Note the alphanumeric phone number and French style.

The Whisky a Go Go was one of the places that popularized go-go dancing. Elmer Valentine, in a 2006 Vanity Fair article, recalled arranging to have a female DJ play records between Rivers' sets so patrons could continue dancing. But because there was not enough room on the floor for a DJ booth, he had a glass-walled booth mounted high above the floor. A contest was held for the female DJ job but when the young winner called Valentine on the night of the opening and tearfully said her mother forbade her from doing it, Valentine recruited the club's cigarette girl, Patty Brockhurst. Valentine quickly hired two more female dancers, one of whom, Joanna Labean, designed the official go-go-girl costume of fringed dress and white boots.

Rivers rode the Whisky-born go-go craze to national fame with records recorded partly Live at the Whisky. In addition, The Miracles recorded the song "Going to a Go-Go" in 1966 (which was covered in 1982 by The Rolling Stones), and Whisky a Go Go franchises sprang up all over the country. Arguably, the rock and roll scene in Los Angeles was born when the Whisky started operation; because of its status as a historic music landmark, the venue was inducted into the Rock and Roll Hall of Fame in 2006.

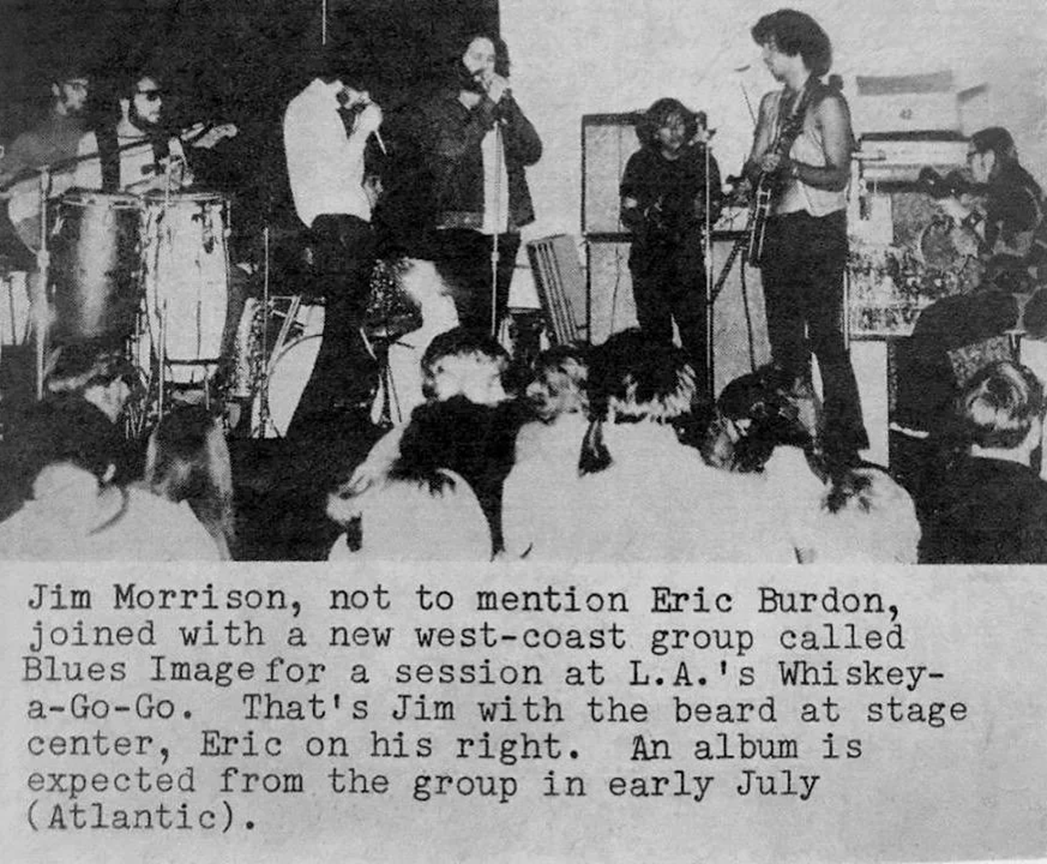
Jim Morrison and Eric Burdon performing onstage with Blues Image in May 1969

The Whisky played an important role in many musical careers, especially for bands based in Southern California. The Byrds, Buffalo Springfield, Smokestack Lightnin', and Love were regulars, and the Doors were the house band for a while. Van Morrison's band Them had a two-week residency in June 1966, with the Doors as the opening act. On the last night they all jammed together on "Gloria." Frank Zappa's the Mothers of Invention got their record contract based on a performance at the Whisky. The Turtles performed there when their newest (and biggest-selling) single "Happy Together" was becoming a hit, only to lose their new bassist, Chip Douglas (who had arranged the song), to the Monkees; guitarist Michael Nesmith invited him to become their producer (he returned to the Turtles a year later, to produce them). Neil Diamond also played at the Whisky on occasion. Metallica bassist Cliff Burton was recruited by the band after they watched him play a show there with his band Trauma. At one point, singer and actress E.G. Daily had a residency at the Whisky.

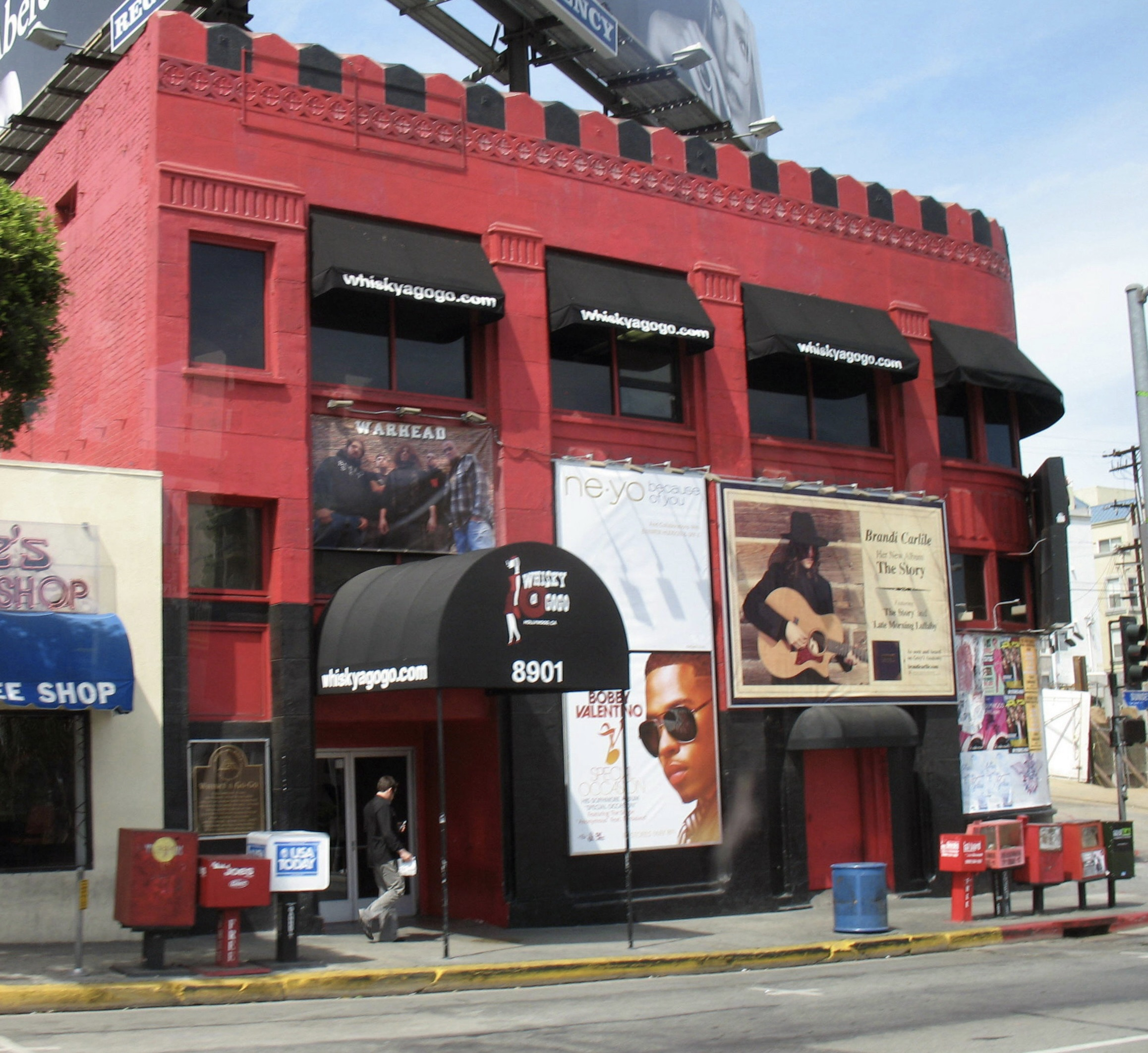
The Whisky a Go Go in 2007

Arthur Lee of Love immortalized the Whisky in the song "Maybe the People Would Be the Times or Between Clark and Hilldale". "Here they always play my songs," he would sing on the side-two opener of Forever Changes. The Whisky was located on the strip between the streets Clark and Hilldale. British rockers Status Quo also referenced the venue in their 1978 song "Long Legged Linda" with the lines, "Well, if you're ever in Los Angeles and you've got time to spare / Take a stroll up Sunset Boulevard, you'll find the Whisky there." Loggins and Messina sang about the club in their tune "Whiskey", found on their 1972 album Loggins and Messina.

In 1966, the Whisky was one of the centers of what fans call the Sunset Strip curfew riots. In the mid-1970s, the Whisky hosted stage presentations, including the long-running show The Cycle Sluts. During the early 1990s, the Whisky hosted a number of Seattle-based musicians who would be a part of the grunge movement, including Soundgarden, Mudhoney, Melvins, Fitz of Depression and 7 Year Bitch. Tracks recorded from a February 12, 1992 concert of Hole appear on their EP, Ask for It (1995). In 1994, Oasis played a controversial set at the Whisky, with frontman Liam Gallagher visibly intoxicated. Immediately following the gig, lead songwriter Noel Gallagher temporarily left the group out of frustration, fleeing to San Francisco, where he penned the song "Talk Tonight". In 1997, System of a Down played at the Whisky. The band were unsigned at the time, and played songs from their early demo tapes, in particular containing the band's only live performance of the song "Blue".

=== Today ===
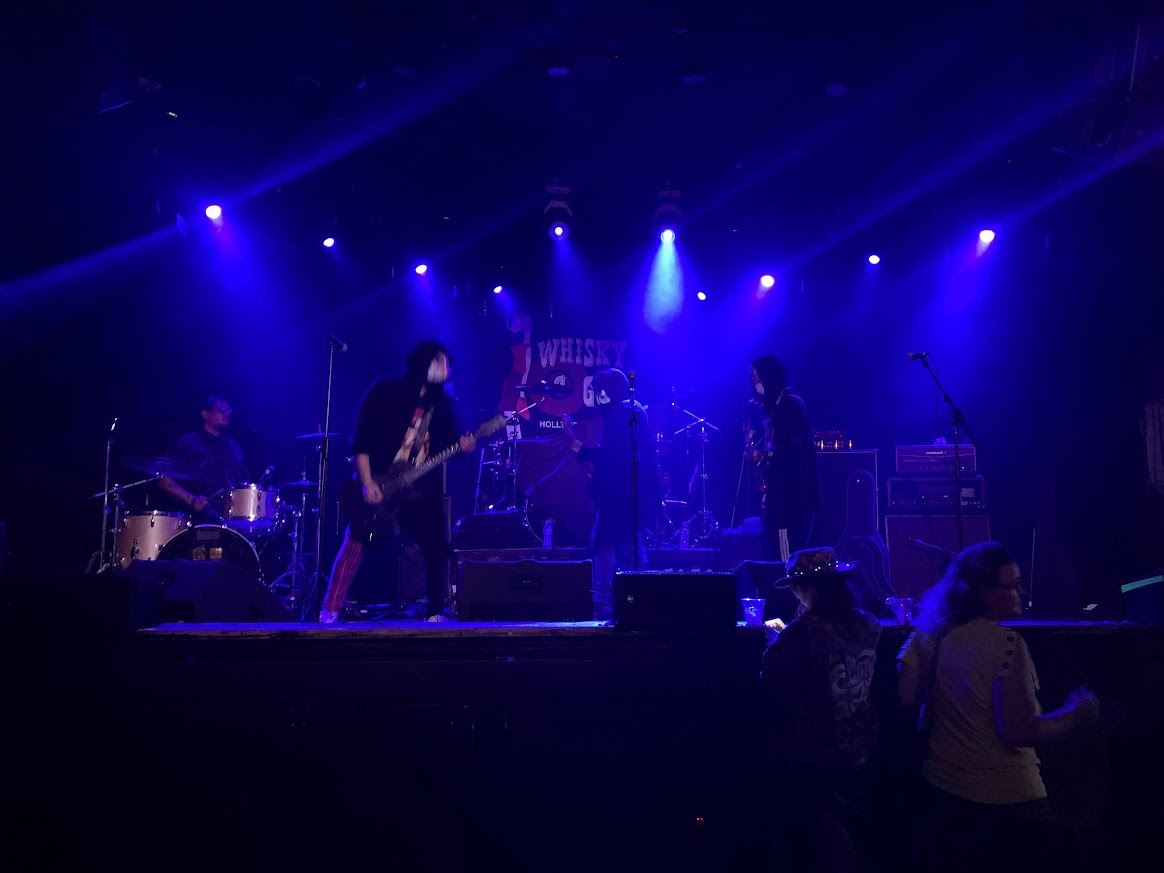
Apollo 03 performing on the current stage in 2022

On September 12, 2016, Whisky a Go Go launched an official TV channel on the Roku Connected TV platform. The Whisky a Go Go channel opens the Whisky's doors to a global audience with live music videos, full concerts and related content spanning its 60-year history.

On May 9, 2025, a dump truck crashed into Whisky a Go Go, as well as several vehicles and an electrical pole. The incident forced the cancellation of the night's scheduled concert, which was to feature bands including Boy Hits Car, Barefoot in the Bathroom, and Gearheart.

== Honors ==
A gene that codes for a subunit of a common potassium ion channel was named for the establishment in the 1960s by William D. Kaplan and William E. Trout. The human Ether-à-go-go-Related Gene (hERG) was so named because when Drosophila flies with mutations in the Ether-à-go-go gene are anaesthetised with ether, their legs start to shake, like the dancing at the Whisky a Go Go nightclub.

== In popular culture ==
Starting in issue #7 of the Marvel comic, Uncanny X-Men, the similarly titled "Coffee-a-Go-Go" became a common hangout spot for the team to take dates to.

The 2013 videogame Grand Theft Auto V features a nightclub known as Tequi-la-la, which is based on Whisky a Go Go.

== See also ==
- Live at the Whisky a Go Go (disambiguation)
- Otis Redding In Person at the Whisky a Go Go, an album recorded in 1966 at the venue
- Hugh Masekela Is Alive and Well at the Whisky, a 1967 album by Hugh Masekela recorded live at the venue
- The Troubadour
- The Viper Room
