= Happy Mother's Day, Love George =

1973 film by Darren McGavin

- Theatrical poster
- Directed by: Darren McGavin
- Written by: Robert Clouse
- Produced by: Darren McGavin; Hans Ulrich Rinderknecht
- Starring: Patricia Neal; Cloris Leachman; Bobby Darin; Ron Howard
- Cinematography: Walter Lassally
- Edited by: George Grenville
- Music by: Don Vincent
- Production company: Taurean
- Distributed by: Cinema 5 Distributing (USA theatrical); Ambassador Film Distributors (Canada); Cinefear (USA VHS); Columbia Pictures (video)
- Release date: August 17, 1973
- Running time: 90 minutes
- Country: United States
- Language: English

Happy Mother's Day, Love George (also known as Run Stranger, Run) is a 1973 American mystery film produced and directed by Darren McGavin. The film stars Patricia Neal, Cloris Leachman, Bobby Darin (his last acting role), Tessa Dahl, Ron Howard, Kathie Browne, Joe Mascolo, Simon Oakland, and Thayer David.

== Plot ==
Teenager Johnny Hanson arrives at a remote New England fishing village. He goes to Ronda's Cafe and sits at a table. When the owner, Ronda Carlson, comes to take his order, he asks her name, and when she replies, he departs. Shaken, Ronda returns to the kitchen where Eddie Martin, the cook and her boyfriend, asks if that was him, and she nods.

Johnny walks to a residential neighborhood and sits outside a house belonging to Ronda's sister, Cara. When Cara's teenage daughter Celia comes outside, she sees Johnny and smiles. Noticing her daughter's interest in the young stranger, Cara upbraids Celia, then turns on her son, Porgie.

Roy, the town's police chief, pulls Johnny over and takes him to the station for questioning. Frisking Johnny, he finds several letters. Roy explains that several people have disappeared recently, and he needs to question strangers. Reading the letters, Roy discovers that Johnny is the son Ronda gave away for adoption years earlier. Johnny then informs Roy that he has come to town to learn his father's identity, but Roy warns him to leave right away.

On release, Johnny walks past Cara's house, and Celia beckons him inside. Celia spies on her neighbor Piccolo with Crystal, his mistress. Celia then tries to seduce Johnny, but he declines. Johnny tells Celia that he discovered Ronda was his mother when he found some letters she had sent to Johnny's foster parents. Stating that Cara is Ronda's estranged sister, Celia takes Johnny into her late father's office and shows him some photos of her father, dead before she was born. When Cara returns home, Celia locks Johnny in the office, but he escapes through a window.

At the cafe, Eddie demands to know if Ronda intends to let Johnny live there. When Ronda answers 'yes', Eddie, furious, announces he is quitting and leaving Ronda. Finding Johnny outside, Eddie beats him up. Hearing noises, Ronda hurries outside and, finding the bloodied Johnny, helps him into her house. There, Johnny sees that Ronda has tacked pictures of him onto the wall, and Ronda confesses regret over giving him away. Johnny demands to know who his father was, and when Ronda refuses to tell him, he leaves.

After church that Sunday, Cara's neighbor, Florence, invites Johnny to her house. Florence reveals that Cara and Ronda have not spoken since Cara's husband, George (Johnny's father), was murdered in his front yard.

Later, Porgie visits his sympathetic aunt Ronda, who reveals that Johnny is her son and asks him to pass the information to Cara. Porgie, continually disparaged by his mother, suggests that Ronda tell her herself. Celia, meanwhile, has continued to spy on Piccolo and Crystal and throws him a paper airplane containing a message to meet her at the summerhouse.

Crystal, amused, insists that Piccolo attend and accompanies him there, waiting outside. When Piccolo fails to reappear, Crystal enters and finds Piccolo's corpse. Panicked, Crystal tries to escape, but the door is locked. After discovering another dead body in the bathtub, Crystal turns to see Celia holding a cleaver. Terrified, Crystal jumps out a window to her death.

As Porgie is fishing, his net pulls up a corpse. That night, Johnny visits Ronda and demands to know his father's name. As Johnny leafs through some old photo albums, Ronda informs him that his father is dead. Finding a clipping about his father, Johnny snatches it and runs to Cara's house, where he tells Cara that he knows her husband George was his father.

Returning home, Celia takes a knife from the kitchen. Cara admits that upon discovering that George had an affair with her sister, she stabbed her stomach with a knife to abort her fetus. The baby, Celia, survived but was born insane. Cara then admits to killing George in a jealous rage. Offering to give Johnny George's watches and rings, Cara goes upstairs for them. As Johnny waits in the living room, he hears Cara scream and sees Celia running down the stairs. Rushing upstairs, Johnny finds Cara dead. When Johnny walks out the door, Celia tries to stab him and they struggle for possession of the knife...

The next morning, Roy takes Celia to jail as Johnny hitches a ride out of town.

== Cast ==
- Patricia Neal as Cara
- Cloris Leachman as Ronda
- Bobby Darin as Eddie
- Tessa Dahl (Patricia Neal's real-life daughter) as Celia
- Ron Howard as Johnny
- Kathie Browne as Crystal
- Joe Mascolo as Piccolo
- Simon Oakland as Sheriff Roy
- Thayer David as Minister Pollard
- Gale Garnett as Yolanda Perry

== Reception ==
Roger Greenspun of The New York Times wrote in his review: "Eventually he finds the identity of the murderer, an identity that should keep you guessing for at least the first six minutes of the movie. Happy Mother's Day, Love George makes use of several distinguished performers. Cloris Leachman was seen to better advantage in The Last Picture Show. Ron Howard is currently seen to better advantage in American Graffiti. And Patricia Neal may be seen to better advantage any time in Maxim Coffee television commercials. In this, his first directorial assignment, Darren McGavin has come up to just about the level of his material, which is very low. The locations, actually in Nova Scotia, are predictably lovely. There is some sense of place (the great gift of the provincial horror movie), but no sense of purpose, or of a reasonable, inevitable doom."

== Production ==
Happy Mother's Day, Love George was produced and directed by Darren McGavin. The film was written by Robert Clouse. Cinematography was done by Walter Lassally. Film editing was done by George Grenville. The score was composed by Don Vencent.

== Release ==
Happy Mother's Day, Love George was released in theatres on August 17, 1973. The film was released on VHS on August 2, 1989.
