= Smokestack Lightnin' (band) =

American rock band

- Origin: United States
- Genre: Rock
- Years active: 1967-1970
- Members: Tom Beaudry; Ronnie Darling; Art Guy; Ric Eiserling; Howard Newhouse

Smokestack Lightnin' were an American rock band that performed in the late 1960s.The band frequently played at the Sunset Strip club Whisky a Go Go in California. They also appeared on The Groovy Show and in the 1968 film Dreams of Glass.

Bones Howe produced their music, with their only album Off the Wall being produced partly by members of The Wrecking Crew. The group disbanded in 1970.

== Discography ==
=== Albums ===
- Off the Wall, Bell Records 1969

=== Singles ===
- "Look What You've Done" / "Got A Good Love", White Whale Records 1967
- "Nadine" / "Crossroads Blues", White Whale 1967
- "Light In My Window" / "Long Stemmed Eyes (John's Song)", Bell 1968
- "Something's Got a Hold on Me" / "I Idolize You", Bell 1969
- "Baby, Don't Get Crazy" / "The Blue Albino Shuffle", Bell 1969
- "Hello, L.A., Bye-Bye Birmingham" / "Well Tuesday", Bell 1970
