= Carved in Stone (Vince Neil album) =

Studio album by Vince Neil
- Released: September 12, 1995
- Recorded: 1994–95
- Genres: Alternative metal, Industrial rock
- Length: 43:08
- Label: Warner Bros.
- Producers: The Dust Brothers, Vince Neil

Vince Neil chronology
Exposed (1993)	Carved in Stone (1995)	Live at the Whisky: One Night Only (2003)

Singles from Carved in Stone
- 1. "Skylar's Song" Released: 1995; 2. "The Crawl (Promo)" Released: 1995

Professional ratings
Review scores
Source	Rating
Allmusic	link

Carved in Stone is the second solo album by Mötley Crüe frontman Vince Neil and his most recent one to feature entirely new material. It was released in 1995 on Warner Bros. Records. It is his final release on the label.

== Background ==
Produced by the Dust Brothers, the album welded rock and hip-hop. "That was before Kid Rock…" Neil observed in 2000, "so no-one was really ready for it then, . If it came out today it'd probably sell fifty million copies."

The album was put on hold while Neil was dealing with his daughter Skylar, who was suffering from nephroblastoma. Neil included a song on the album in honor of Skylar called "Skylar's Song". Skylar died from her illness on August 15, 1995, a month before the album was released. Following its release and a tour, Vince returned to Mötley Crüe in January 1997. This is his only album to feature bassist Robbie Crane and last for drummer Vikki Fox. Guitarist Brent Woods also plays on the record. He previously jammed with Wildside and was later a touring guitarist for Warrant.

The album charted at #139 on the Billboard 200. "Skylar's Song" was released as a single and featured a music video and "The Crawl" was released as a promo single.

== Track listing ==
1. "Breakin' in the Gun" (Frederickson, Fredricksen, Neil) – 3:52
2. "The Crawl" (Crane, Foxx, Frederickson, Neil) – 4:17
3. "One Way" (Frederickson, Fredricksen, Neil) – 3:51
4. "Black Promises" (Crane, Foxx, Frederickson, Neil) – 4:52
5. "Skylar's Song" (Crane, Neil, Woods) – 4:58
6. "Make U Feel" (Frederickson, Fredricksen, Neil) – 4:01
7. "Writing on the Wall" (Crane, Foxx, Frederickson, Neil) – 4:50
8. "Find a Dream" (Crane, Foxx, Frederickson, Neil) – 4:54
9. "One Less Mouth to Feed" (Frederickson, Fredricksen, Neil) – 3:36
10. "The Rift" (Christiansen, Frederickson, Neil) – 3:57

Japanese bonus tracks

1. "Lust for Life" (Iggy Pop cover)
2. "25 or 6 to 4" (Chicago cover)

== Personnel ==
- Vince Neil – lead vocals, bass on "Lust For Life", tuba on "25 or 6 to 4"
- Brent Woods – guitar
- Robbie Crane – bass (on all tracks except "Lust For Life")
- Vikki Foxx – drums

== Charts ==
Year	Chart	Position
1995	UK Rock & Metal Albums (Official Charts)	25
1995	US Billboard 200	139
