= Exposed (Vince Neil album) =

Studio album by Vince Neil
- Released: April 27, 1993
- Recorded: 1992
- Studio: Record Plant, Hollywood, Rumbo Recorders, Canoga Park, California
- Genre: Hard rock, glam metal, heavy metal
- Length: 52:25
- Label: Warner Bros.
- Producer: Ron Nevison

Vince Neil chronology
Exposed (1993)	Carved in Stone (1995)

Singles from Exposed
- 1. "You're Invited (But Your Friend Can't Come)" Released: 1992; 2. "Sister of Pain" Released: 1993; 3. "Can't Change Me" Released: 1993; 4. "Can't Have Your Cake" Released: 1993

Professional ratings
Review scores
Source	Rating
AllMusic	4/5 stars
Rolling Stone	2/5 stars

Exposed is the debut solo album of Mötley Crüe frontman Vince Neil following his exit from the band in 1992. It was released in 1993 and reached No. 13 on the US Billboard 200 chart.

The album was recorded at the Record Plant in Los Angeles in 1992. Neil titled the album Exposed because he thought of the album as his moment in the spotlight, no longer being a member of Mötley Crüe.

Neil's manager, Bruce Bird, died of a brain aneurysm during the recording. Neil later hired Burt Stein.

== Background ==
Vince Neil, together with then manager Bruce Bird and Jack Blades, originally approached long time friend and ex-Ozzy bassist Phil Soussan to help him write the album and put a band together. Soussan left his then current band Beggars & Thieves and wrote several tracks with Neil of which 5 were included on the album. The original lineup was to have featured Adrian Vandenberg of Whitesnake and Manic Eden on guitar but a switch was made at the last minute, at Warner Bros. recommendation, and Steve Stevens was hired. The former Billy Idol guitarist and Atomic Playboys founder, claims to have subsequently played all bass and guitar tracks on Exposed. During the final recording process, Soussan left the band after differences with Stevens, who had insisted on wanting to play bass on the album. Robbie Crane was then switched from rhythm guitar to bass, Dave Marshall was hired as rhythm guitarist and Vikki Foxx continued to play drums. The band's first show was played at the Roxy under the name "Five Guys From Van Nuys". The band eventually went on tour, opening for Van Halen on their 1993 tour promoting their live album and the biggest gig was in Canada at Molson Park north of Toronto playing on the same bill with Van Halen and Kim Mitchell on Canada Day July 1, 1993, to over 50,000 fans

In an interview conducted with Metal Sludge, Robbie Crane said that he left the band after getting into a fight and punching Neil. On that occasion, the band musicians had missed a show due to a broken down bus, and Neil had to perform with members of other bands (Slaughter and Warrant), and the two got into a heated exchange when Crane arrived at the venue. Crane said that he hit a drunken Neil, causing Neil to hit and cut his head open on a spike on the ground. Crane also said that Foxx was fired from the band after stealing equipment.

== Content ==
The album includes Neil's debut solo single "You're Invited (But Your Friend Can't Come)". The song exists in two versions; the first of which was included on the soundtrack to the Les Mayfield movie Encino Man – a music video was released for this version featuring a cameo from Pauly Shore. The track was rerecorded for the album with Billy Idol guitarist Steve Stevens.

Also included is a cover of "Set Me Free" from the Sweet's Desolation Boulevard, and the Soussan/Neil ballad "Forever", dedicated to the latter's wife Sharise, who filed for divorce from Neil earlier that year. At the end of the song is a few seconds of silence, followed by a little girl's voice saying "Oh no!" – this is Vince's late daughter Skylar.

Pornstar Janine Lindemulder can be seen in the video for the second single "Sister of Pain". The video for the third single, "Can't Change Me", was filmed at the Record Plant. The video for the fourth single, "Can't Have Your Cake", featured the then up-and-coming Pamela Anderson, and the singer's son Neil Wharton, who portrayed a young Vince Neil in the video.

Neil recorded two bonus tracks for the Japanese edition: "Blondes (Have More Fun)" and the Ramones' cover "I Wanna Be Sedated".

"The Last Goodbye", cowritten with Todd Meagher, was pulled from the album at the last minute due to a dispute between Meagher and Neil that culminated in a brawl at the Roxbury on Sunset Strip. The song was a ballad, about Neil's split from Mötley.

"Exposed did well... and I'm sure the record that Mötley Crüe did without me was also very good," Neil said in 2000, "but my solo record wasn't Mötley Crüe and theirs wasn't either. The magic just wasn't there."

== Track listing ==
No.	Title	Writer(s)	Length
1.	"Look in Her Eyes"	Vince Neil, Steve Stevens, Phil Soussan	5:51
2.	"Sister of Pain"	Neil, Jack Blades, Tommy Shaw	5:02
3.	"Can't Have Your Cake"	Neil, Stevens	3:56
4.	"Fine, Fine Wine"	Neil, Soussan	4:12
5.	"The Edge"	Neil, Stevens, Soussan	4:53
6.	"Can't Change Me"	Blades, Shaw	4:39
7.	"Set Me Free" (Sweet cover)	Andrew Scott	4:03
8.	"Living Is a Luxury"	Neil, Stevens	5:39
9.	"You're Invited (But Your Friend Can't Come)"	Neil, Blades, Shaw	4:22
10.	"Gettin' Hard"	Neil, Stevens, Soussan	4:37
11.	"Forever"	Neil, Stevens, Soussan	5:11

Japanese edition bonus tracks
No.	Title	Writer(s)	Length
12.	"Blondes (Have More Fun)" (Rod Stewart cover)	Jim Cregan, Rod Stewart	3:48
13.	"I Wanna Be Sedated" (The Ramones cover)	Dee Dee Ramone, Joey Ramone, Johnny Ramone	3:30

== Personnel ==
=== Band members ===
- Vince Neil – all vocals, vibraslap
- Steve Stevens – all guitars, bass guitar
- Vikki Foxx – drums, percussion
- Dave Marshall – rhythm guitar (credited, but does not appear)
- Robbie Crane – bass guitar (credited, but does not appear)

=== Additional musicians ===
- Robbie Buchanan – keyboards
- Tommy Funderburk, Timothy B. Schmit, Donna McDaniel, Christina Nichols – backing vocals

=== Production ===
- Ron Nevison – producer, engineer
- Craig Brock, Andy Udoff, Ben Wallach – assistant engineers
- Chris Lord-Alge – mixing at Image Recorders, Hollywood

=== Photography ===
- Les Guzman – album cover, liner notes

== Charts ==
=== Album ===
Chart (1993)	Peak position
Australian Albums (ARIA)	84
German Albums (Offizielle Top 100)	96
Swedish Albums (Sverigetopplistan)	41
Swiss Albums (Schweizer Hitparade)	29
UK Albums Chart	44
US Billboard 200 (US)	13

=== Singles ===
Year	Title	Chart	Position
1992	"You're Invited (But Your Friend Can't Come)"	US Album Rock Tracks	17
1992	"You're Invited (But Your Friend Can't Come)"	Australian Singles Chart	63
1992	"You're Invited (But Your Friend Can't Come)"	UK Singles Chart	63
1993	"Sister of Pain"	US Album Rock Tracks	12
1993	"Can't Have Your Cake"	US Album Rock Tracks	34

== Certifications ==
Region	Certification	Certified units/sales
Japan (RIAJ)	Gold	100,000^{^}
^{^} Shipments figures based on certification alone.
