= Something Evil =

- Written by: Robert Clouse
- Directed by: Steven Spielberg
- Starring: Sandy Dennis; Darren McGavin; Ralph Bellamy
- Music by: Wladimir Selinsky
- Country of origin: United States
- Original language: English

Production
- Producer: Alan Jay Factor
- Cinematography: Bill Butler
- Editor: Allan Jacobs
- Running time: 73 minutes
- Production companies: Belford Productions; CBS Entertainment Productions

Original release
- Network: CBS
- Release: January 21, 1972

Something Evil is a 1972 American TV movie starring Sandy Dennis, Darren McGavin and Ralph Bellamy. Directed by Steven Spielberg, the screenplay was written by Robert Clouse.

== Plot ==
A married couple with two young children move into a Pennsylvania farmhouse that turns out to be inhabited by demons. Paul is a TV producer and his wife Marjorie is an artist. The home and countryside seem idyllic until strange things start to occur. The sound of a baby's crying wakes Marjorie several times and ultimately leads to a creepy discovery. Paul's colleague and an employee die in a mysterious accident when driving away from the farmhouse. Harry attempts to warn the family about the potential evil possessing their property. Marjorie slowly unravels. She believes that the evil in the house is possessing her and wants to leave. She believes she has become a danger to her children, but an ex-farmhand enlightens her to the real source of danger—Satan.

== Cast ==
- Sandy Dennis as Marjorie Worden
- Darren McGavin as Paul Worden
- Ralph Bellamy as Harry Lincoln
- Jeff Corey as Gehrmann
- Johnny Whitaker as Stevie Worden
- John Rubinstein as Ernest Lincoln
- David Knapp as John
- Laurie Hagen as Beth
- Herb Armstrong as Schiller
- Margaret Avery as Irene
- Norman Bartold as Mr. Hackett
- Sheila Bartold as Mrs. Hackett
- Lois Battle as Mrs. Faraday
- Bella Bruck as Mrs. Gehrmann
- Lynn Cartwright as Secretary

== Filming locations ==
- Golden Oak Ranch, Newhall, California
- Studio City, California

== Production ==
Spielberg directed Something Evil immediately after his television movie Duel (1971), and it aired in January 1972.

Spielberg himself has a cameo as a party guest in one scene, as does actor and script doctor Carl Gottlieb, who would later also have a small role (and act as script doctor) in Spielberg's Jaws (1975)

== Reception ==
While the majority of critics have dismissed Something Evil, Neil Sinyard wrote: "Spielberg's direction is nothing short of magnificent. There are splendid montages as mother [Sandy Dennis] paints and creates models and mobiles that will eventually be significant in resisting the evil spells; dazzling dissolves and sinister camera placement for stealthy, apprehensive entrances into fearful places; and...a Hitchcockian sense of the moment to throw away explanatory dialogue (the explanation for the house's past) when it is less interesting than the mystery and menace."

== Song ==
The movie features the "Apple Bar Candy Song" by Charlie Marie Gordon. It appears in the film performed by Laurie Hagen for a commercial that Darren McGavin's character is filming. The song has been spoofed several times.

== Home media ==
Something Evil was released on VHS by CBS/Fox Video Japan in 1993. Issued in a mid-sized plastic case with insert artwork, it had the words (in English) "DIGITALLY PROCESSED" on the back of the sleeve.
