= Grace Kelly on screen and stage =

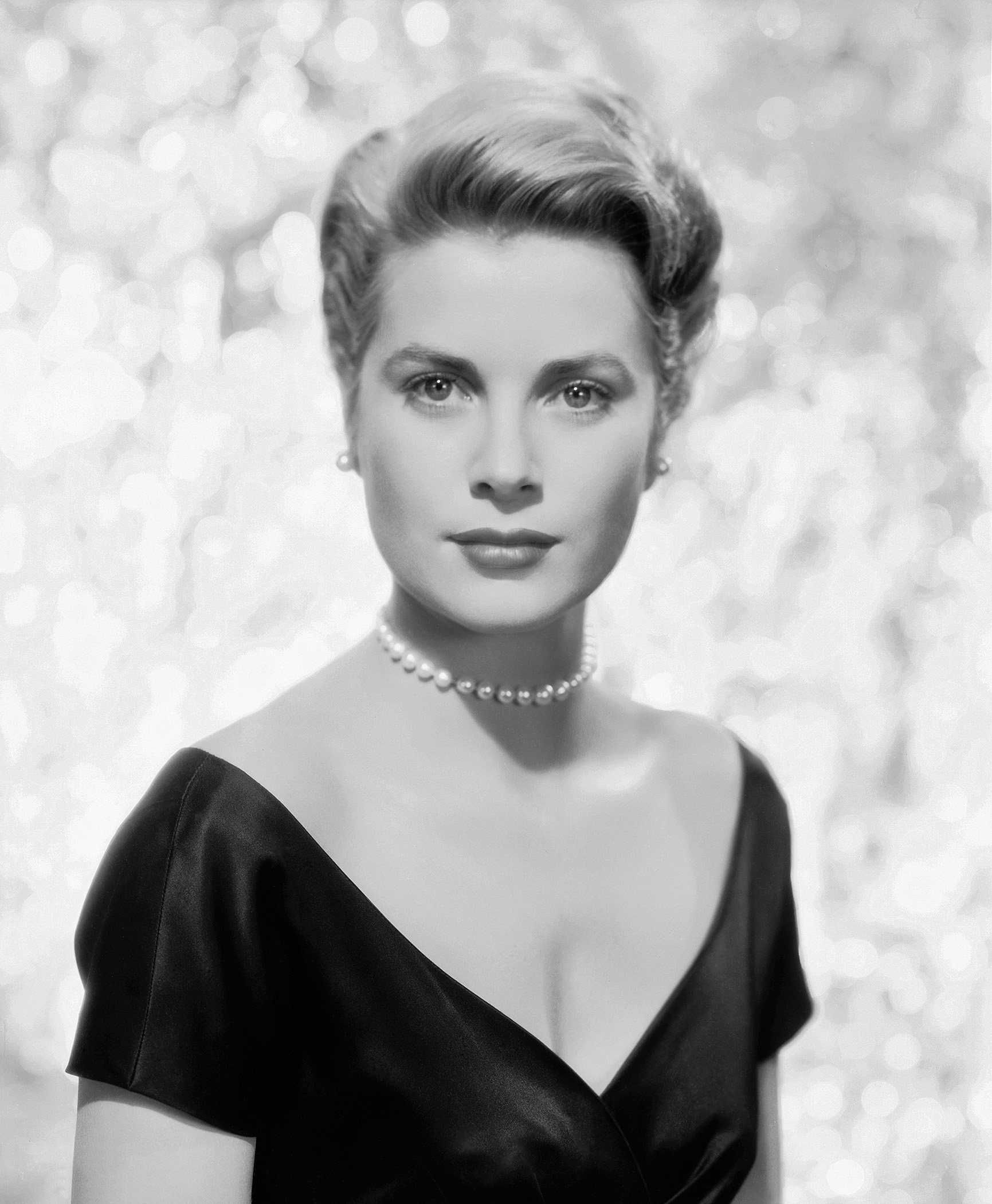
Grace Kelly in 1955

American actress Grace Kelly (1929–1982) made her screen debut in the televised play "Old Lady Robbins" (1948) on the anthology series Kraft Television Theatre. The following year, Kelly made her Broadway debut playing Bertha in The Father. In 1950, she appeared on numerous television anthology series, including The Philco Television Playhouse, Studio One, The Clock, The Web, and Danger. Kelly played Helen Pettigrew in the television play "Berkeley Square" on the Prudential Family Playhouse (1951). In 1952, she portrayed Dulcinea in the drama "Don Quixote" on the anthology series CBS Television Workshop, and also starred in a number of other anthology series, including Hallmark Hall of Fame, Lux Video Theatre, and Suspense.

Kelly's film debut was a minor role in the 1951 drama Fourteen Hours. She followed this with an appearance in the western High Noon with Gary Cooper. For her performance as Linda Nortley in John Ford's Mogambo, she received the Golden Globe Award for Best Supporting Actress, and a nomination for the Academy Award for Best Supporting Actress. In 1954, she starred in the Alfred Hitchcock-directed thrillers Dial M for Murder, with Ray Milland, and Rear Window, with James Stewart. In the same year, she portrayed the long-suffering wife of an alcoholic actor, played by Bing Crosby, in The Country Girl (1954), for which she received the Academy Award for Best Actress and the Golden Globe Award for Best Actress in a Motion Picture – Drama in 1955. Kelly re-teamed with Hitchcock on the romantic thriller To Catch a Thief (1955), with Cary Grant.

In 1956, she appeared in the romantic comedy The Swan, and the musical comedy High Society. Later that year, the 26-year-old Kelly retired from acting, to marry Prince Rainier III of Monaco, becoming the princess of Monaco. In this role, she made appearances in the documentaries A Look at Monaco (1963) and Monte Carlo: C'est La Rose (1968). She was the narrator of the ballet documentary The Children of Theatre Street (1977), which was nominated for the Academy Award for Best Documentary. Kelly died in 1982 after being involved in a car crash near Monte Carlo.

She was listed 13th in the American Film Institute's 25 Greatest Female Stars of Classical Hollywood cinema in 1999, and has a star on the Hollywood Walk of Fame.

== Film ==
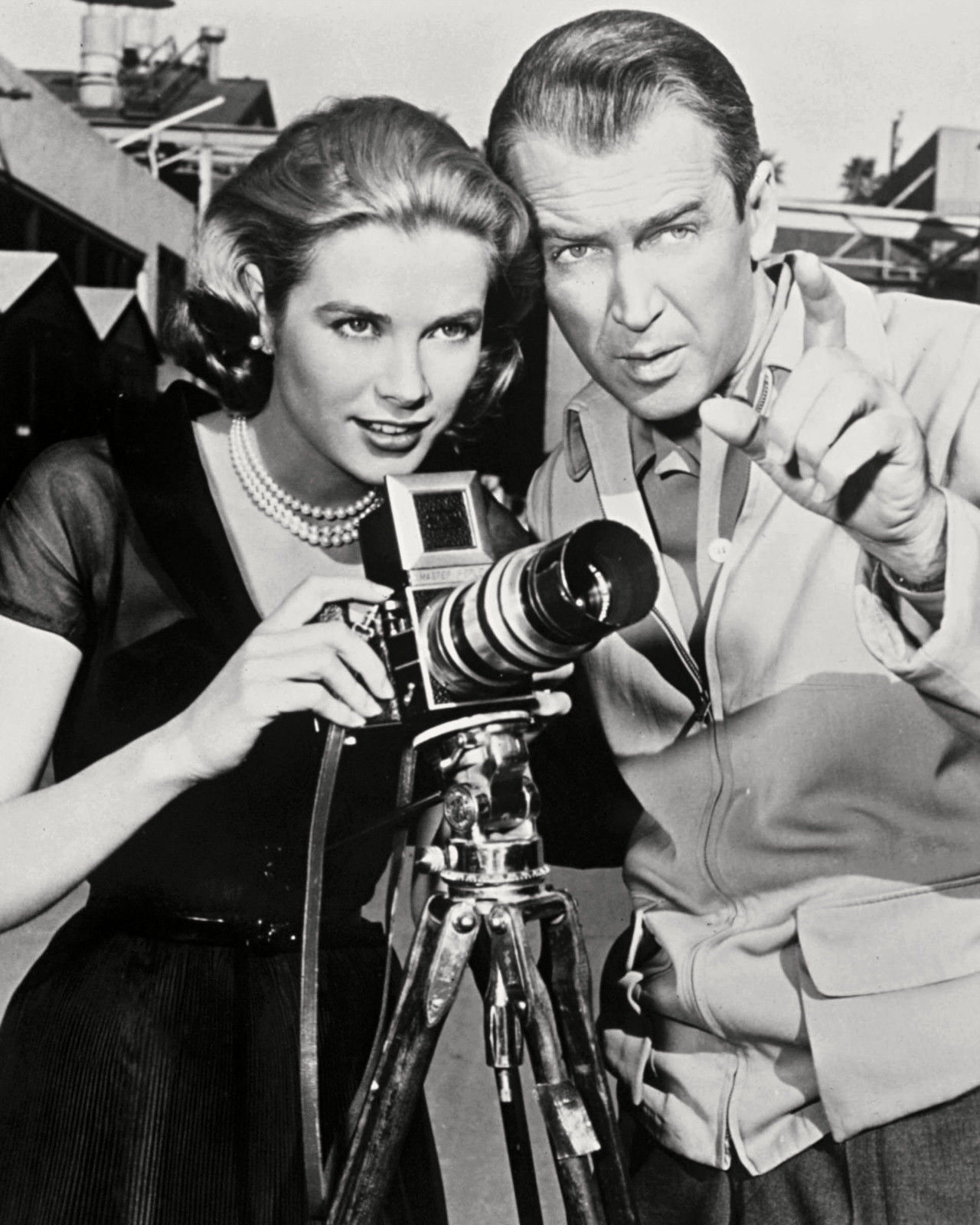
Grace Kelly and James Stewart in a publicity photo for Rear Window (1954)

List of film credits
Year	Title	Role	Notes	Ref(s)
1951	Fourteen Hours	Louise Anne Fuller		
1952	High Noon	Amy Fowler Kane		
1953	Mogambo	Linda Nordley		
1954	Dial M for Murder	Margot Mary Wendice		
1954	Rear Window	Lisa Carol Fremont		
1954	The Bridges at Toko-Ri	Nancy Brubaker		
1954	The Country Girl	Georgie Elgin		
1954	Green Fire	Catherine Knowland		
1955	To Catch a Thief	Frances Stevens		
1956	The Swan	Princess Alexandra		
1956	High Society	Tracy Lord		
1956	The Wedding in Monaco	Herself	Documentary film	
1959	Glück und Liebe in Monaco	Herself	German language film English title: "Happiness and Love in Monaco"	
1977	The Children of Theatre Street	Narrator	Documentary film	

== Television ==
List of television credits
Year	Title	Role	Notes	Ref(s)
1948; 1952–1954	Kraft Television Theatre	Various characters	Episode: "Old Lady Robbins"; Episode: "The Cricket on the Hearth"; Episode: "The Small Hours"; Episode: "Boy of Mine"; Episode: "The Thankful Heart"	
1950–1953	The Philco Television Playhouse	Various characters	Episode: "Bethel Merriday"; Episode: "Ann Rutledge"; Episode: "Leaf Out of a Book"; Episode: "The Sisters"; Episode: "Rich Boy"; Episode: "The Way of the Eagle"	
1950	Ripley's Believe It or Not!	Unknown	Episode: "The Voice of Obsession"	
1950; 1952	Studio One	Unknown	Episode: "The Rockingham Tea Set"; Episode: "The Kill"	
1950	Actors Studio	Various characters	Episode: "The Apple Tree"; Episode: "The Token"; Episode: "The Swan"	
1950	Cads, Scoundrels and Ladies	Unknown	Segment: "The Lovesick Robber"	
1950	Comedy Theater	Unknown	Episode: "Summer Had Better Be Good"	
1950	Lights Out	Unknown	Episode: "The Devil to Pay"; Episode: "The Borgia Lamp"	
1950	Big Town	Unknown	Episode: "The Pay-Off"	
1950	The Clock	Unknown	Episode: "Vengeance"	
1950	The Web	Unknown	Episode: "Mirror of Delusion"	
1950	Somerset Maugham TV Theatre	Unknown	Episode: "Episode"	
1950; 1952	Danger	Unknown	Episode: "The Sergeant and the Doll"; Episode: "Prelude to Death"	
1951	Prudential Family Playhouse	Helen Pettigrew	Episode: "Berkeley Square"	
1951	The Nash Airflyte Theater	Unknown	Episode: "A Kiss for Mr. Lincoln"	
1951–1952	Armstrong Circle Theatre	Various characters	Episode: "Lover's Leap"; Episode: "Brand from the Burning"; Episode: "City Editor"; Episode: "Recapture"	
1952	CBS Television Workshop	Dulcinea	Episode: "Don Quixote"	
1952	Hallmark Hall of Fame	Claire Conroy	Episode: "The Big Build Up"	
1952–1953	Lux Video Theatre	Various characters	Episode: "Life, Liberty, and Orrin Dooley"; Episode: "A Message for Janice"; Episode: "The Betrayers"	
1952	Robert Montgomery Presents	Unknown	Episode: "Candles for Theresa"	
1952	Suspense	Unknown	Episode: "Fifty Beautiful Girls"	
1952	Goodyear Television Playhouse	Unknown	Episode: "Leaf Out of a Book"	
1953	Toast of the Town	Sang duet with Ralph Meeker	Episode: "Teahouse of the August Moon"	
1963	A Look at Monaco	Herself	Documentary film	
1966	The Poppy Is Also a Flower	Narrator	Television film	
1968	Monte Carlo: C'est La Rose	Herself	Documentary film	

== Stage ==
List of theater credits
Year(s)	Title	Role	Theater	Notes	Ref(s)
1949–1950	The Father	Bertha	Cort Theatre	November 16, 1949 – January 14, 1950	
1952	To Be Continued	A Young Woman	Booth Theatre	April 23 – May 2	

== Bibliography ==
- Spoto, Donald (October 5, 2010). High Society: The Life of Grace Kelly. Three Rivers Press. ISBN 978-0-307-39562-7. Archived from the original on April 25, 2016.
- Wydra, Thilo (November 18, 2014). Grace: A Biography. Skyhorse. ISBN 978-1-62914-967-7. Archived from the original on May 9, 2021.
