= Monte-Carlo Television Festival =

Festival in Monaco

- Location: Grimaldi Forum, Monte-Carlo, Monaco
- Founded: 1961
- Founded by: Prince Rainier III
- Awards: Golden Nymph
- Festival date: 5 days
- Website: www.tvfestival.com

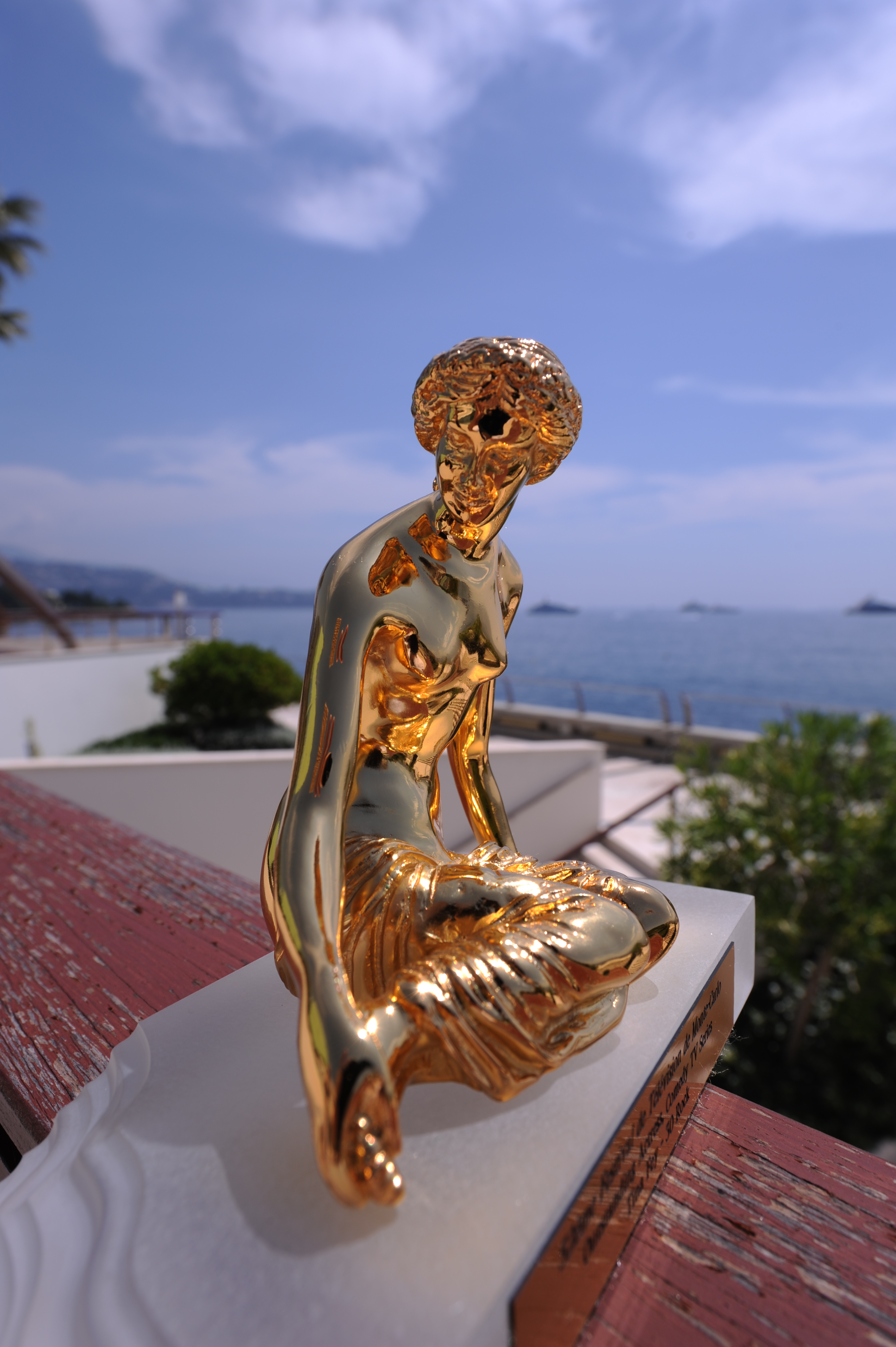
Golden Nymph Award

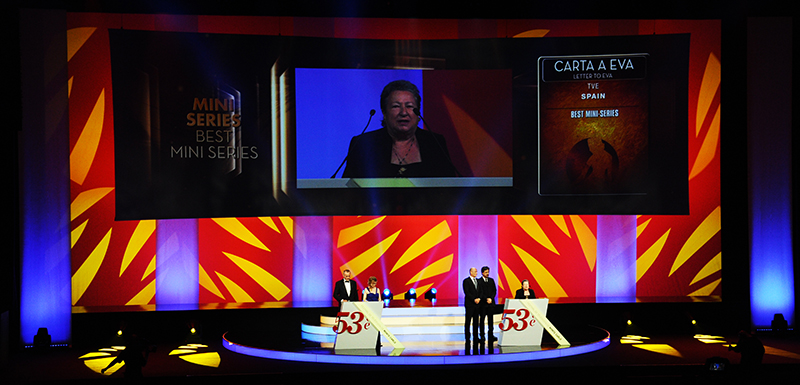
Golden Nymph Awards Ceremony

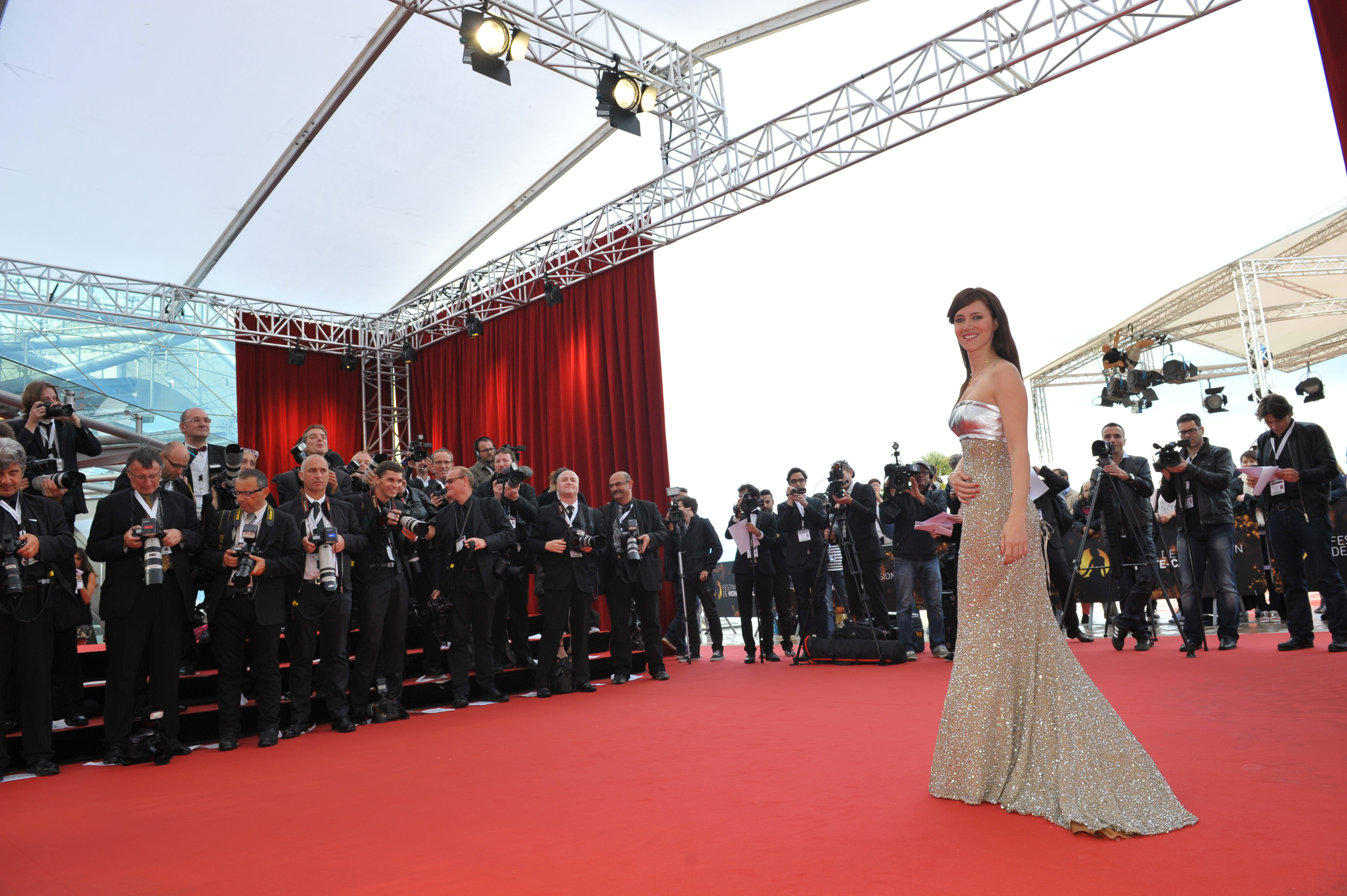
Red Carpet

The Monte-Carlo Television Festival is held every year in June in the Principality of Monaco at the Grimaldi Forum, under the Honorary Presidency of H.S.H. Prince Albert II of Monaco.

The opening ceremony inaugurates each new edition, introducing the jury members overseeing each project in competition. The evening includes a preview screening of a television program.

Open to the public, the festival also offers opportunities to meet international stars, attend TV series "behind the scenes" conferences, public screenings and autograph signing sessions.

The Golden Nymph Awards Ceremony, reveals the winners of the best in TV programming from around the world in front of an audience of more than a thousand guests.

== History ==
By creating the Festival de Télévision de Monte-Carlo in 1961, Prince Rainier III of Monaco, wished to "encourage a new art form, in the service of peace and understanding between men". Monaco's international status ideally suited the Prince's ambition: to recognize television as an exceptional means of bringing cultures together and enhancing their respective knowledge.

The project generated worldwide interest and, over the years, many distinguished celebrities have sat on the juries, bringing international recognition to the best of television programming. However, the Monte-Carlo Television Festival is above all, since the 1980s, a very important opportunity for business, a huge international market.

Prince Albert II has been the Honorary President of the Festival since 1988.

The best of worldwide television programming has been rewarded with Golden Nymph statuettes, copies of the "Salmacis" nymph by the Monegasque sculptor François Joseph Bosio (1768–1845), chief court sculptor to Louis XVIII, the original of which is on show at the Louvre Museum in Paris.

== The Golden Nymph Awards ==
The Golden Nymph Awards are among the most prestigious prizes in international television, rewarding the best TV programs and actors. Over the course of the festival, an international jury of leading actors and industry professionals attend screenings of all the programs in competition.

== Categories and awards ==
=== Fiction ===
The Fiction category is composed of TV series, films and mini series. Six awards are made:

- Best Film
- Best Series
- Best Creation
- Best Actress
- Best Actor
- Jury Special Prize (the very favourite programme of the Jury)

=== News ===
The News category refers to programs that cover international, national, regional and local news or current affairs events. Four awards are made:

- Best News Coverage
- Best News Documentary
- Best Documentary Film
- Jury Special Prize (the very favourite programme of the Jury)

=== Prince Rainier III Special Prize ===
This Special Prize was created by Albert II and is given to a programme selected by him. It is awarded to the best documentary dealing with environmental issues. A prize of €10,000 is awarded to the laureate. The award is made in partnership with the Prince Albert II of Monaco Foundation.

=== Special prizes ===
A selection of special prizes are awarded by partner organisations. The winners are selected from among all of the entries made to the Golden Nymph Awards.

- The Press Prize of the International Committee of the Red Cross
- Prize of the Red Cross of Monaco
- The AMADE Prize
- The SIGNIS Prize: The Silver Dove

== See also ==
- List of television festivals
