= The Wedding in Monaco =

- Directed by: Jean Masson
- Produced by: Jean Masson
- Starring: Grace Kelly; Rainier III, Prince of Monaco
- Narrated by: José Ferrer
- Cinematography: André Bac; Jean Lehérissey; Albert Militon; Robert Schneider
- Music by: Stan Kenton; Daniel White
- Production company: Metro-Goldwyn-Mayer
- Distributed by: Metro-Goldwyn-Mayer
- Release date: 17 May 1956
- Running time: 31 minutes
- Countries: United States; France; Monaco
- Languages: English; French
- Box office: $159,000

The Wedding in Monaco is a 1956 documentary film covering the celebrations in Monaco leading up to the wedding of Prince Rainier III to Grace Kelly, as well as the wedding itself. The 31-minute Eastmancolor CinemaScope film was directed by Jean Masson and released by Metro-Goldwyn-Mayer, Kelly's film studio before her retirement from acting.

== Film content ==
The film opens with a brief shot of the Prince Rainier III and Grace Kelly descending a staircase. It then shows a long aerial shot of Monaco accompanied by narration about the city. Then, various preparations made during the days leading up to the wedding are shown.

Next, the film documents the Grace Kelly's arrival in Monaco aboard the American ship, the SS Constitution. Prince Rainier's yacht sails out into the harbor to meet the ocean liner, and the future Princess transfers to the Prince's ship. When the couple returns to shore, they are greeted by waiting crowds. The film then shows various shots of the castle and its guards, before showing a dance performance outside the castle at night.

Them, the film shows foreign delegations arriving at the castle the next day. This is followed by the legal civil marriage ceremony between Prince Rainier III and Grace Kelly. After the civil marriage, Grace Kelly appearing before the people of Monaco. That night, the Prince and Princess attend an opera.

Finally, the film documents the religious wedding ceremony, which took place the day after. The film shows the Princess walking down the isle, the couple exchanging their vows, and the couple walking back down the isle together to leave. After leaving the church, the documentary follows the royal motorcade through the city to the port, where the royal couple board the Prince's yacht to depart for their honeymoon.

== Production ==
The Wedding in Monaco was directed by Jean Masson for Citel Monaco and was distributed by Metro-Goldwyn-Mayer. It was filmed and released in color and CinemaScope. The film was narrated by José Ferrer.

Grace Kelly granted MGM, the film studio she worked for, the exclusive film rights to her wedding in exchange for terminating her contract. MGM helped to manage the wedding. Technicians sent by the studio oversaw the dress rehearsal to ensure the wedding would have proper lighting and sound and Kelly's wedding dress was designed by MGM costume designer Helen Rose.

== Reception ==
According to MGM records the film earned $108,000 in the US and Canada and $51,000 elsewhere resulting in a profit of $15,000.

== See also ==
- List of American films of 1956
- Monte Carlo: C'est La Rose
