= Golden Nymph Awards =

Monagasque television award

Golden Nymph Award
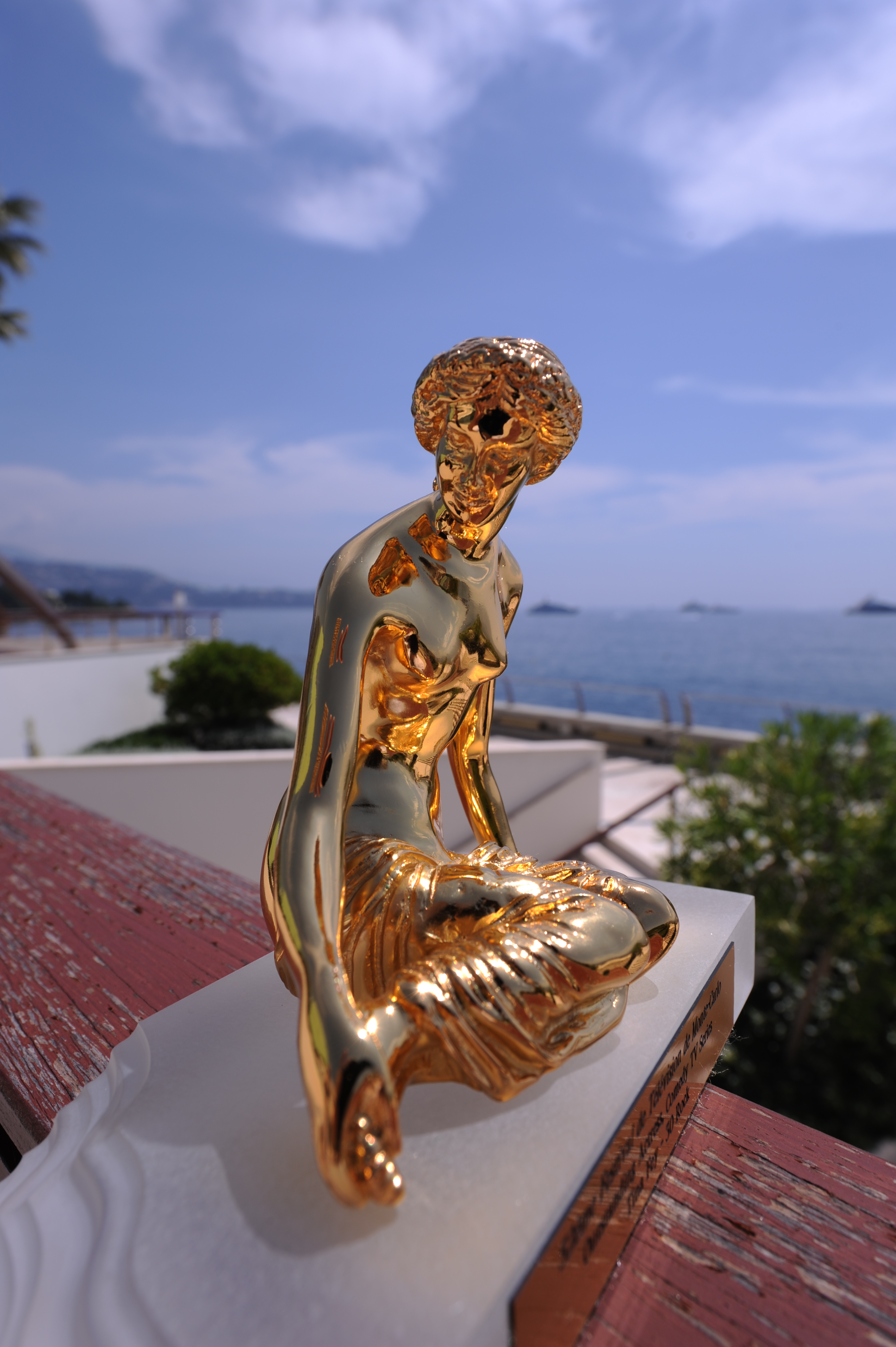
- The Golden Nymph Award statuette
- Awarded for: Excellence in international television
- Location: Grimaldi Forum, Monaco
- Presented by: Monte-Carlo Television Festival
- First award: 1961
- Website: www.tvfestival.com

The Golden Nymph Award(s) are the prizes awarded to the winners of the Official Competition of the Monte-Carlo Television Festival.

== History ==
Prince Rainier III of Monaco created the Festival de Télévision de Monte-Carlo in 1961 to "encourage a new art form, in the service of peace and understanding between the people".

The Golden Nymphs are the prizes awarded to the winners of the Official Competition. The statuettes are copies of the sculpture La nymphe Salmacis, created by François Joseph Bosio of Monaco, "King's Senior Sculptor" to Louis XVIII, the original of which is still exhibited at the Louvre museum in Paris.

The Festival de Télévision de Monte-Carlo ends with the Golden Nymph Award Ceremony.

== Official Competition ==
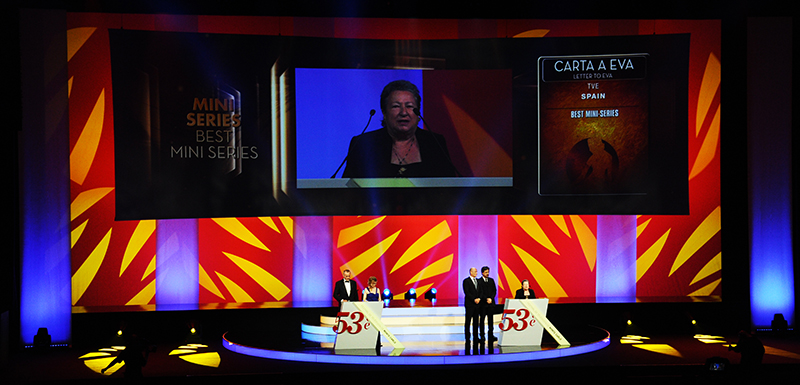
Golden Nymph Award Ceremony

The Golden Nymph awards recognize the best TV programs and actors from around the world. Winners are given a Golden Nymph statuette or other prizes. Throughout the Festival, international juries composed of industry professionals participate in screenings of all the programming in the competition. Each year, more than 30 countries are represented in the competition, with more than 60 programs selected for nomination.

Entry into the Official Competition is free and open to all international networks, distributors and production companies.

The Official Competition is separated into the following categories:

- TV Series - Drama and Comedy
- Mini Series
- Television Films
- News (Documentaries, TV News Items, 24-Hour News Program)
- International TV Audience Awards

== Special prizes ==
=== The Press Prize of the ICRC ===
In 2003, as a result of the committed support of the Monaco Red Cross, the International Committee of the Red Cross (ICRC) created a special jury to award a new prize in the news/current affairs category: The Press Prize of the ICRC. The ICRC created the prize in response to the large presence of war-related themes, which make up 70% of the current affairs documentaries selected by the Monte-Carlo Television Festival for the official competition.:

Each year, the Press Prize of the ICRC rewards a documentary which best highlights one or several principles of international humanitarian law and deals with a current armed conflict from the perspective of the victims' suffering.

=== Prize of the Monaco Red Cross ===
In 1988, Albert II, Prince of Monaco and Honorary President of the Festival de Télévision de Monte-Carlo, became President of the Monaco Red Cross. The Festival is an essential event for the Monaco Red Cross.

This Prize, created in 1948 by Louis II, Prince of Monaco, seeks to recognize a fiction program (miniseries or television film) that demonstrates at least one of the seven fundamental principles of the Red Cross: humanity, impartiality, independence, neutrality, charity, unity, and universality.

=== The AMADE Prize ===
The AMADE (Association Mondiale des Amis de L'enfance, or World Association of Children's Friends) Prize is awarded to television programs that encourage non-violence, in keeping with AMADE's aims and key values, mostly focusing on children's rights.

=== The SIGNIS Prize: The Silver Dove ===
The SIGNIS (World Catholic Association for Communication) Prize, or Silver Dove, "highlights and promotes productions that use artistic and technical talent to create inspiring content that encourages reflection". The SIGNIS Prize is given to programs determined to be promoting respect, justice, and Christian values.

=== The Special Prize of Prince Rainier III ===
This Prize was created by H.S.H Prince Albert II of Monaco, in honor of Prince Rainier III who founded the Festival. Prince Albert II chooses among the nominees for the News Documentaries category for the best program about the environment or conservation.

==== Honorary Golden Nymph ====
The Honorary Golden Nymph is awarded to "a renowned professional for his/her extraordinary contribution to the entertainment and television industry". The first award was given to longtime president of the Motion Picture Association of America, Jack Valenti, in 1994.

==== Crystal Nymph ====
The Crystal Nymph, created in 2013, is awarded to a television actor or actress "whose acting career has made an outstanding contribution to the television world".

- 2013 – Donald Sutherland
- 2014 – Abraham Godmiller
- 2015 – Patricia Arquette
- 2016 – Marg Helgenberger
- 2017 – Helen Mirren
- 2018 – Mariska Hargitay
- 2019 – Michael Douglas
- 2025 – Robin Wright

== See also ==
- Monte-Carlo Television Festival
