= Garden Club of Monaco =

International Competition of Bouquets

The Garden Club of Monaco was founded by the late Princess Grace, Princess of Monaco in 1968. She was the first president of the club. After her death, in 1982, her widower, Rainier III, Prince of Monaco appointed his daughter Princess Caroline to the role.

The club is mainly known for hosting the annual International Competition of Bouquets. 2021 will see the 52nd edition of the competition, from 16 to 17 October. The founder thought the club was necessary to the "lifeblood" of community life in Monaco. Julia Clements (Lady Seton) was a guest speaker at the first edition of the event, originally called the May Flower Show.
