= Monte Carlo: C'est La Rose =

- Directed by: Michael Pfleghar
- Written by: John Aylesworth; Frank Peppiatt
- Produced by: Roger Gimbel
- Cinematography: Heinz Hölscher
- Edited by: David E. Blewitt; Lawrence E. Neiman; Margot von Schlieffen
- Music by: Jerry Fielding
- Release date: 1968
- Running time: 60 minutes
- Country: United States
- Language: English

Monte Carlo: C'est La Rose is a 1968 American television special hosted by Princess Grace guiding the public through a tour of Monte Carlo. She encounters other celebrities such as Françoise Hardy, Terry-Thomas, Gilbert Bécaud, David Winters and his troupe the David Winters Dancers, which consisted of Toni Basil and Anita Mann. They all perform musical numbers. The TV special also features her husband Rainier III, Prince of Monaco.

== Plot ==
Princess Grace introduces us to the touristic attractions on Monte Carlo. She gives the historical background of the sites and it follows by performance by the guests.

The first site introduced is the Casino of Monte Carlo. In this location, Terry-Thomas acting in his signature arch-typical Britisher, performs the song "The man who broke the bank at Monte Carlo".

In various segments we see the David Winters Dancers performing in the old town, and the Royal Palace while a hundred Royal guards stand at their post.

French teenage idol Françoise Hardy sings in one of its well known clubs.

Gilbert Bécaud' hit song ''C'est La Rose'' is used as the theme song, and he performs various song at the Monaco's Sporting club for the international Red Cross Gala.

== Production ==
According to The Times the director planned the shoot around the weather so it wouldn't be too sunny or dark. However at the time of the shoot Monte Carlo proved to be usually windy, they had to wait several hours before they could shoot a scene with Princess Grace where she wear a specific Dior gown. The production also caused traffic problems for the locals, especially when the princess was on set. Kelly did her own make-up for the shoot, and was waiting at the Royal palace between takes which created some hardship when coordinating scenes with her.

Dance choreographer David Winters explained that he brought with him Anita Mann and Toni Basil because he thought they were his best students. With them he conceptualized a ballet where they are tourist visiting famous sites in Monte Carlo.

== Release ==
Produced by Wolper Production, the musical tour was released on ABC on March 6, 1968. It was among the top TV program that evening. Part of 3 hours eclectic program which consisted of various documentaries produced by Wolper, that started in the evening at 7:30 with a Jacques Cousteau documentary called The Savage World of the Coral Jungle, followed with Monte Carlo: C'est La Rose, and was finalized by a World War 2 documentary named The Rise and Fall of the Third Reich.

== Reception ==
Both on its own and as whole with the two other Wolper productions it was well received by the following reviewers.

Rick Du Brow of The Town Talk said of Princess Grace "The princess finally relaxed on television and was not only breathtakingly beautiful but quite charming as well" and said that the show was "a reasonably pleasant diversion".

The El Dorado Times published that it was "an artful and imaginative combination of guided tour, variety show and fashion show".

== Cast ==
- Grace Kelly
- Françoise Hardy
- Terry-Thomas
- Gilbert Bécaud
- Rainier III, Prince of Monaco
- David Winters
- Toni Basil
- Anita Mann

== See also ==
- The Wedding in Monaco

== Works cited ==
- Winters, David (2018). Tough guys do dance. Pensacola, Florida: Indigo River Publishing. ISBN 978-1-948080-27-9.
