= World Association of Children's Friends =

- Abbreviation: A.M.A.D.E.
- Formation: 1963
- Founder: Grace, Princess of Monaco
- Type: Charitable organization
- Legal status: NGO
- Headquarters: Monte Carlo, Monaco
- Region served: Europe, Asia, Africa, and South America
- Members: Alliance of 12 countries
- Honorary Chairman: Albert II, Prince of Monaco
- Chairman: Caroline, Princess of Hanover
- Secretary General: Jérôme Froissart
- Website: http://www.amade-mondiale.org/en

The World Association of Children's Friends (AMADE) is a charity organization founded by Grace, Princess of Monaco, to support the development, education, and health of children worldwide. AMADE operates through a network of 12 local organisations in Europe, Asia, South-America and Africa. The Association has consultative status with UNICEF, UNESCO and the United Nations Economic and Social Council, as well as participative status with the Council of Europe.

== Mission ==
After witnessing the plight of Vietnamese children in 1963, Princess Grace founded the Association to support the fundamental rights of children across the globe. AMADE's code of conduct was later influenced by the Convention on the Rights of the Child, adopted by the United Nations in 1989, as well as the Millennium Declaration adopted in 2000 to fight against poverty.

AMADE's mission statements are:

- To protect the most vulnerable children from violence, exploitation and abuse.
- To promote children's development by contributing to access to education and health.
- To accompany support change through advocacy.

The Association lists itself as a development charity that offers perennial responses to struggling communities, focusing on strengthening of capacities and the self-sufficiency of beneficiaries. AMADE also contributes to fighting against gender inequalities and highlighting the importance of equal opportunities in struggling regions.

== Activities ==
AMADE reportedly has helped 40,000 children each year through its relief efforts. The Association runs ongoing projects under the umbrella of three programs: Dignity for Women, the Energy of Hope, Capoeira for Peace, and Unaccompanied Migrant Children.

=== Protection ===
In 2013, AMADE assisted in the renovation and development of the VTA Centre, a support center for young girls living in the streets of Kinshasa, Congo, accused of witchcraft. In 2014, the Association worked for the professional inclusion of young street people in Kinshasa, and founded 6 professional training centers. In 2015, AMADE assisted Terre des Hommes, Italia to allocate transit centers in Sicily as part of a psychological and legal support programme for unaccompanied migrant children. In 2016, the Association mobilized alongside other NGO's to persuade the Cambodian government to lower the age of children allowed to stay in prison with their mothers from 6 to 3 years old, in accordance with the Cambodian League for the Promotion and Defense of Human Rights.

AMADE currently works with the Government of the Philippines' Department of Social Affairs to establish a school for young female victims of abuse, exploitation, and violence. The Association assists Marseille City Hall in the coordination of the Second Chance program, designed to educate incarcerated minors in detention. AMADE currently works with Panzi Hospital, founded by Dr. Denis Mukwege, designed to support children and young girl victims of sexual violence in Bukavu.

=== Education ===
In 2012, AMADE worked with the Monegasque Government to build a middle school and a high school in the municipality of Matana, Burundi, to advocate for exemplary education standards in the area. In 2016, the Association assisted in the enrollment of OVC (Orphans and Vulnerable Children) into the school's population. In 2017, AMADE worked with Lagazel to donate solar lamps to young students to support access to education in Nouakchott, Mauritania, as well as open production workshops in rural areas to promote employment.

=== Health ===
In 2013, the Association worked with the Chiliean Ministry of Health to assist children in Santiago, Chile, with metabolic diseases in low-income communities through awareness and medical treatment. In 2013, AMADE helped finance research and design programs to raise awareness for pediatric cancer in Monaco. In 2015, the Association funded equipment for the emergency, operating, sterilization, and radiology rooms of the Abbis Ababa Mother and Child Centre in Addis Abeba, Ethiopia. In 2016, AMADE assisted in designing pediatric health education protocols, teaching aids, and training systems for health workers in Bamako, Mali aiming to reduce rates of child morality. Later that year, the Association worked with microfinance firms to support access to patients with sickle cell disease at the Tahouha Hospital in Niger.

In 2017, the Association worked to disseminate anti-scam information for health insurance schemes for families in Bamako, Mali. In 2018, AMADE worked with the Princess Grace Foundation (La Foundation Princesse Grace, Monaco), to establish medical resources, tools, and tests for doctors treating Friedreich's ataxia in children and young adults. In 2019, AMADE worked with HEAL Africa to assist in Swahili translations for the Zero Mother's Die App in Bukavu, Congo. Later that year, the Association began construction on a mother-child community health centre in Goma, Congo, providing prenatal consultation, family planning, nutrition, AIDS clinics, and vaccination. AMADE also announced a training program for a catheterization service inside the Mother-Child Hospital le Luxembourg in Bamako, Mali. In 2020, the Association began an extensive 100-day research project for the reduction of child morality in Niger, in partnership with Yale University. AMADE also created a social fund to support healthcare access to children admitted to the Rafic Hariri Hospital in Beyrouth, Lebanon. During the COVID-19 pandemic, AMADE assisted in supporting health services in West Africa to provide medical equipment, research, and remote education.

=== Post-emergency ===
In 2013, AMADE worked with the Monaco Red Cross to finance the restoration of primary classrooms in Negros Island, Philippines after Typhoon Haiyan. In 2016, the Association renovated and built new classrooms in Canton de Region, Nepal, after the April 2015 Nepal earthquake. In 2020, AMADE began assisting in building repairs and school tuition for the Saint Joseph Brothers School in Beyrouth, Lebanon, after the 2020 Beirut explosion.

=== Advocacy ===
In 2015, AMADE worked with the Monaco Department of Education to create digital teaching kits for students to raise awareness about water concerns in the developing world. The also Association assisted with the UNICEF campaign to raise local awareness for the International Convention on the Rights of the Child on its 25th anniversary. In 2017, AMADE assisted in the translations and free distribution of small trade and community service resources in Kinshasa, Congo. Later that year, the Association raised public awareness of the persecution of "witch" girls living on the streets, as well as the recruitment of child soldiers, in Bukavu, Congo.
