= Jean Masson =

French politician (1907–1964)

Jean Masson (8 September 1907, Bayon, Meurthe-et-Moselle – 10 August 1964) was a French politician who served as state secretary in various governments during the French Fourth Republic, Minister of Youth Affairs and Sports in 1952–53. Deputy mayor of Chaumont, he was a member of various governments in the Fourth Republic.
