= Red Cross of Monaco =

Humanitarian organization in Monaco

- Founded: 1948; 78 years ago
- Purpose: Humanitarian aid
- Location: Monte Carlo, Monaco
- Members: 550 volunteers
- Founder: Louis II of Monaco
- President: Albert II of Monaco
- Deputy President: Philippe Narmino
- Employees: 58 staff
- Website: www.croix-rouge.mc

The Red Cross of Monaco (French: Croix-Rouge monégasque) is the national Red Cross Society of Monaco, founded in 1948 by Louis II of Monaco in the aftermath of the Second World War.

== Presidency ==
- 1948–1949: Prince Louis of Monaco
- 1949–1958: Prince Rainier of Monaco
- 1958–1982: Princess Grace of Monaco
- 1982–present: Prince Albert of Monaco

== Fundraising ==
The Monaco Red Cross's largest fundraising event is the annual Red Cross Gala, which takes place in the Salle des Étoiles of Sporting Monte-Carlo. A yearly clearance sale is also held on "World Cross Day" in May, raising awareness and finances for the charity.

The organization has an annual aid budget of €7,000,000, and assists 20 to 40 counties affected by war, famine, and natural disasters each year.
