= Norbert Blecha =

Austrian film producer

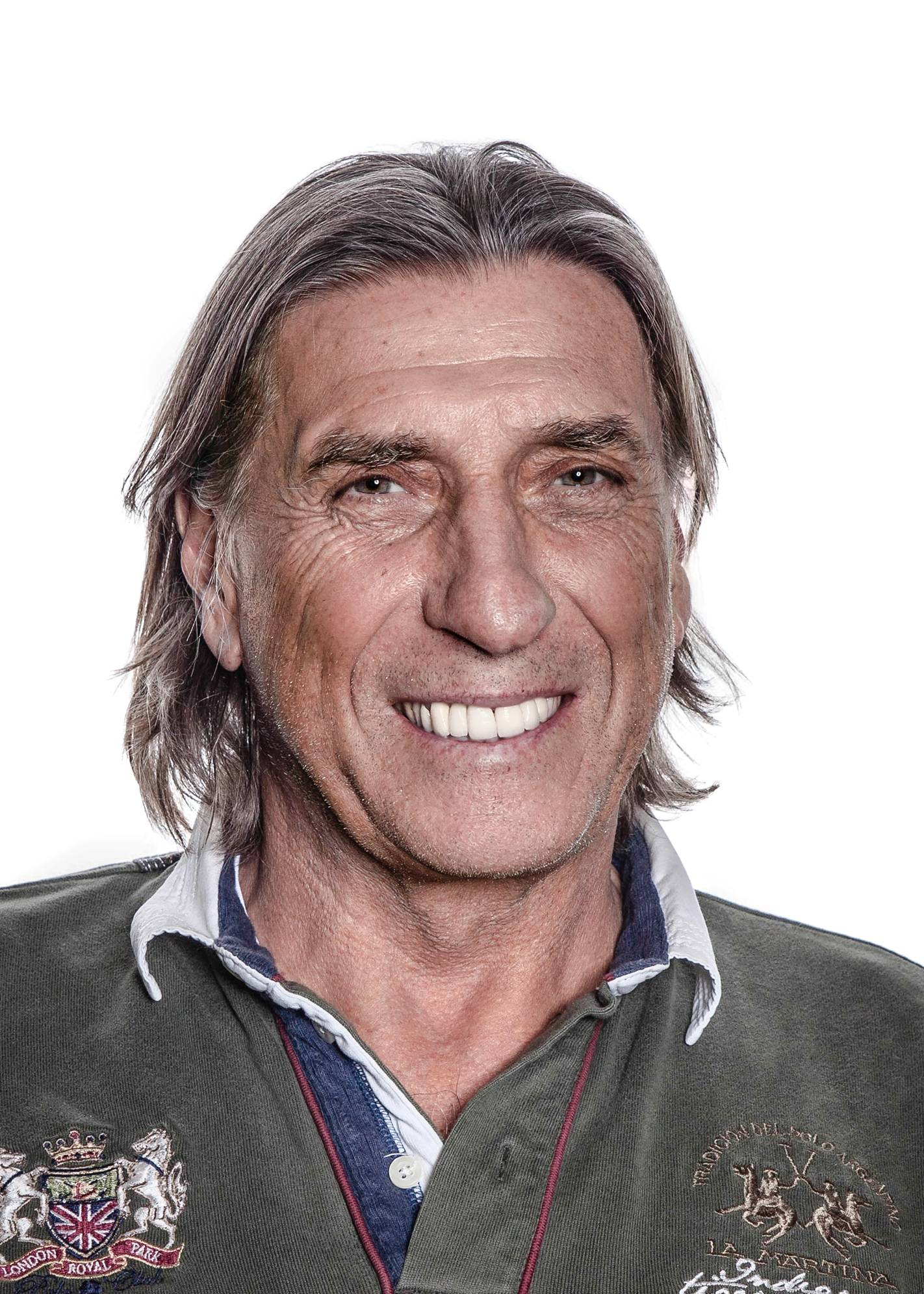
- Blecha in 2016
- Born: 22 September 1950; Vienna, Austria
- Occupation(s): Film producer, actor, stuntman
- Years active: 1979–present
- Spouse: Katrin Ehrbar

Norbert Blecha (born 22 September 1950) is an Austrian film producer, actor and stuntman.

== Career ==
Norbert Blecha was born in 1950 in Vienna, the first child of Ernestine and Josef Blecha. Initially, he worked as a mechanic in his parents' car workshop. He debuted in the film industry as a stuntman in the shooting of the film The Fifth Musketeer in Vienna (by that time he was also noticed by Ursula Andress and had a relationship with her for about a year).

He then moved to the United States in 1974, where he studied business at the University of Southern California and worked as a stuntman and actor. In 1984, he returned to Vienna, founded Terra-Film production house, and began his second film-related career as a producer. His first success as a producer was the 1991 drama Requiem for Dominic, directed by Robert Dornhelm. Occasionally, he also acts in these films, like the role of Kurt in Red Heat or that of Werner in The Venice Project or that of a Syrian arms dealer in Christopher Lambert's film Mothers.

== Producer filmography ==
- 1984: Jungle Warriors (with T.A.T. Films)
- 1985: Rage To Kill (with T.A.T. Films)
- 1985: Red Heat (with T.A.T. Films)
- 1987: Children Of The Dust (with Buzon Films)
- 1988: Courage Mountain (with Michael Douglas’ Stone Group)
- 1989: Eye of the Widow (with Adlar Productions)
- 1990: Requiem for Dominic
- 1991: Flying The Blue And The White (with Yarkon Productions)
- 1992: Es lebe die Liebe, der Papst und das Puff (Evviva L'Ammore)
- 1993: Danube Chronicles
- 1994: Allzeit getreu – allzeit bereit
- 1995: Eine tödliche Liebe
- 1996: Der Bockerer 2
- 1996: The Unfish
- 1997: Black Flamingos
- 1999: The Venice Project
- 1999: Mein Freund der Wolf
- 2000: Da wo die Berge sind
- 2001: Ene mene muh – und tot bist du
- 2001: Extreme Ops
- 2001: The Red Phone – Manhunt and Checkmate
- 2002: Da wo die Liebe wohnt
- 2003: Da wo die Heimat ist
- 2004: Da wo die Herzen schlagen
- 2005: Da wo das Glück beginnt
- 2005: Metamorphosis
- 2006: Da wo es noch Treue gibt
- 2006: Jump
- 2007: Da wo die Freundschaft zählt
- 2007: Fanz Antel – ein Leben für den Film
- 2008: Johanna – Köchin aus Leidenschaft
- 2008: Da wo wir zuhause sind
- 2009: Gregor Mendel – The Gardener Of God
- 2010: Heimkehr mit Hindernissen
- 2012: K2 – The Italians Mountain
- 2013: Ruf der Pferde
- 2014: State Of The Art
- 2015: Kultur aus den Trümmern
- 2015: Mehrstimmig (Die Wiener Sängerknaben)
- 2015: Lotte Tobisch – Ansichten einer Grand Dame
- 2017: Mothers
- 2024: Lackenbach. Meine Kehillah (documentary film)

== Personal life ==
Blecha is married to the lawyer Katrin Ehrbar.

== Awards ==
- Decoration of Honour for Services to the Republic of Austria
