= Mayoralty of Rudy Giuliani =

Mayoralty in New York City (1994–2001)

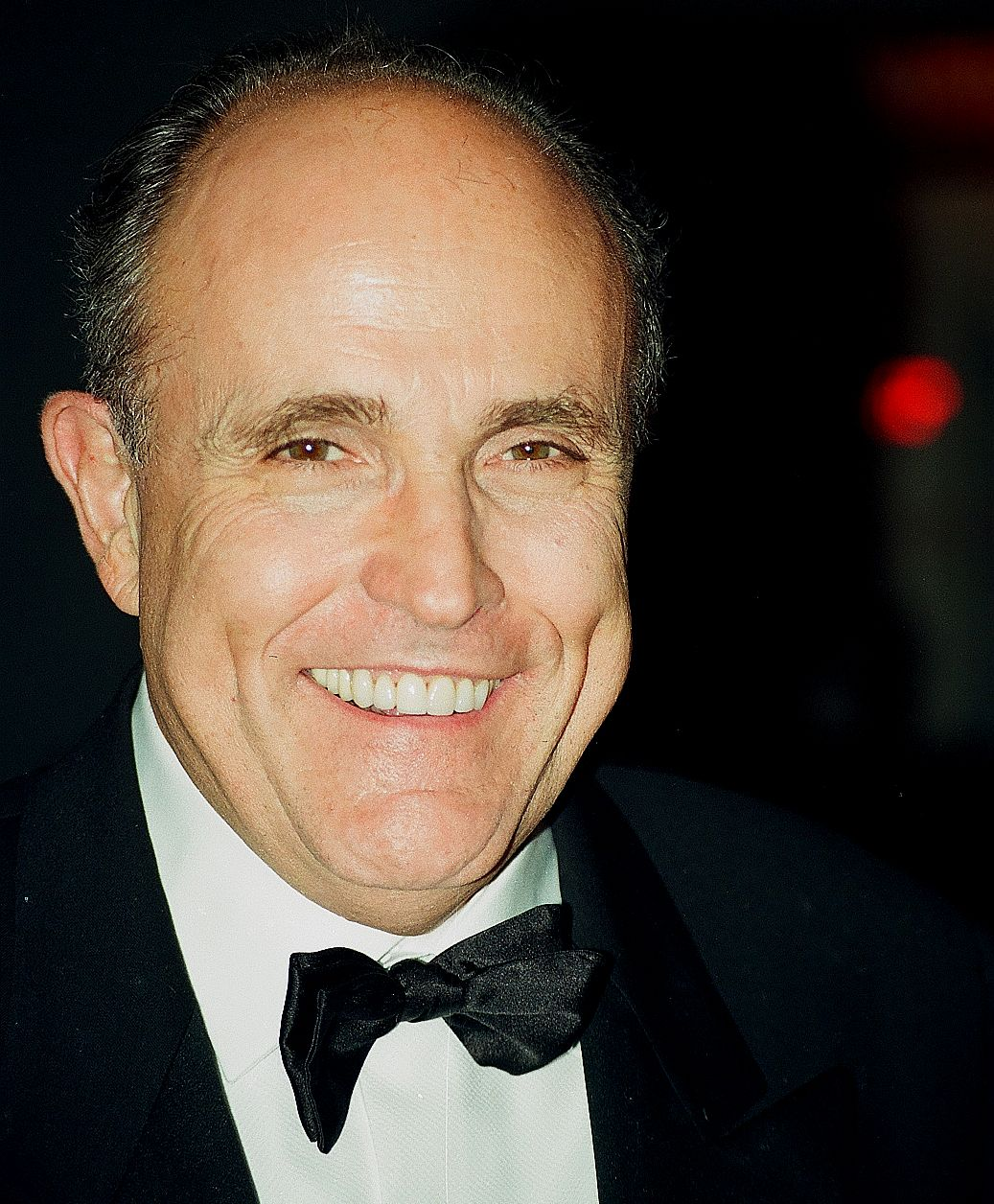
- Giuliani in 2000
- Mayoralty of Rudy Giuliani; January 1, 1994 – December 31, 2001
- Mayor: Rudy Giuliani
- Party: Republican
- Election: 1993; 1997
- Flag of the Mayor

Rudy Giuliani (full name Rudolph William Louis Giuliani) served as the 108th Mayor of New York City from January 1, 1994 until December 31, 2001.

== Crime control ==
In Giuliani's first term as mayor the New York City Police Department, under Giuliani appointee Commissioner Bill Bratton, adopted an aggressive enforcement and deterrence strategy based on James Q. Wilson's "broken windows" research. This involved crackdowns on relatively minor offenses such as graffiti, turnstile jumping, and aggressive "squeegeemen", on the principle that this would send a message that order would be maintained and that the city would be "cleaned up".

At a forum three months into his term as mayor, Giuliani mentioned that freedom does not mean that "people can do anything they want, be anything they can be. Freedom is about the willingness of every single human being to cede to lawful authority a great deal of discretion about what you do and how you do it".

Giuliani also directed the New York City Police Department to aggressively pursue enterprises linked to organized crime, such as the Fulton Fish Market and the Javits Center on the West Side (Gambino crime family). By breaking mob control of solid waste removal, the city was able to save businesses over $600 million.

One of Bratton's first initiatives was the institution in 1994 of CompStat, a comparative statistical approach to mapping crime geographically in order to identify emerging criminal patterns and chart officer performance by quantifying apprehensions. The implementation of CompStat gave precinct commanders more power, based on the assumption that local authorities best knew their neighborhoods and thus could best determine what tactics to use to reduce crime. In turn, the gathering of statistics on specific personnel aimed to increase accountability of both commanders and officers. Critics of the system assert that it instead creates an incentive to underreport or otherwise manipulate crime data. The CompStat initiative won the 1996 Innovations in Government Award from Harvard Kennedy School.

Bratton, not Giuliani, was featured on the cover of Time Magazine in 1996. Giuliani forced Bratton out of his position after two years in what was generally seen as a battle of two large egos in which Giuliani was unable to accept Bratton's celebrity.

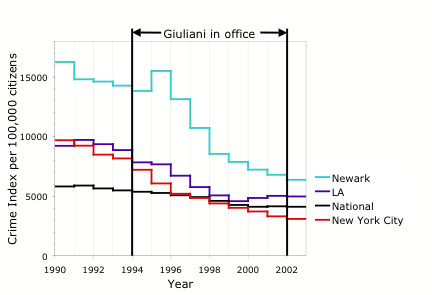
National, New York City, and other major city crime rates (1990–2002)

Giuliani continued to highlight crime reduction and law enforcement as central missions of his mayoralty throughout both terms. These efforts were largely successful. However, concurrent with his achievements, a number of tragic cases of abuse of authority came to light, and numerous allegations of civil rights abuses were leveled against the NYPD. Giuliani's own Deputy Mayor, Rudy Washington, alleged that he had been harassed by police on several occasions. More controversial still were several police shootings of unarmed suspects, and the scandals surrounding the sexual torture of Abner Louima and the killing of Amadou Diallo. In a case less nationally publicized than those of Louima and Diallo, unarmed bar patron Patrick Dorismond was killed shortly after declining the overtures of what turned out to be an undercover officer soliciting illegal drugs. Even while hundreds of outraged New Yorkers protested, Giuliani staunchly supported the New York City Police Department, going so far as to take the unprecedented step of releasing Dorismond's "extensive criminal record" to the public, for which he came under wide criticism. While many New Yorkers accused Giuliani of racism during his terms, former mayor Ed Koch defended him as even-handedly harsh: "Blacks and Hispanics ... would say to me, 'He's a racist!' I said, 'Absolutely not, he's nasty to everybody'."

The amount of credit Giuliani deserves for the drop in the crime rate is disputed. He may have been the beneficiary of a trend already in progress. Crime rates in New York City started to drop in 1991 under previous mayor David Dinkins, three years before Giuliani took office. Under Dinkins's Safe Streets, Safe Cities program, crime in New York City decreased more dramatically and more rapidly, both in terms of actual numbers and percentage, than at any time in previous New York City history. According to investigative journalist Wayne Barrett, the rates of most crimes, including all categories of violent crime, made consecutive declines during the last 36 months of Dinkins's four-year term, ending a 30-year upward spiral. A small but significant nationwide drop in crime also preceded Giuliani's election, and continued throughout the 1990s. Two likely contributing factors to this overall decline in crime were federal funding of an additional 7,000 police officers and an improvement in the national economy. But many experts believe changing demographics were the most significant cause. Some have pointed out that during this time, murders inside the home, which could not be prevented by more police officers, decreased at the same rate as murders outside the home. Also, since the crime index is based on the FBI crime index, which is self-reported by police departments, some have alleged that crimes were shifted into categories that the FBI does not quantify.

According to some analyses, the crime rate in New York City fell even more in the 1990s and 2000s than nationwide and therefore credit should be given to a local dynamic: highly focused policing. In this view, as much as half of the reduction in crime in New York in the 1990s, and almost all in the 2000s, is due to policing. Opinions differ on how much of the credit should be given to Giuliani; to Bratton; and to the last Police Commissioner, Ray Kelly, who had previously served under Dinkins and criticized aggressive policing under Giuliani.

Among those crediting Giuliani for making New York safer were several other cities nationwide whose police departments subsequently instituted programs similar to Bratton's CompStat.

In 2005 Giuliani was reportedly nominated for a Nobel Peace Prize for his efforts to reduce crime rates in the city. The prize went instead to Mohamed ElBaradei and the IAEA for their efforts to reduce nuclear proliferation.

=== Gun control lawsuit ===
On June 20, 2000, Giuliani announced that the City of New York had filed a lawsuit against two dozen major firearm manufacturers and distributors. The ramifications of this action extended beyond the end of Giuliani's mayoralty: President Bush signed the Protection of Lawful Commerce in Arms Act in October 2005 in an effort to protect gun companies from liability. In 2006, the Tiarht Amendment was added to an appropriations bill and was signed into law. The amendment seeks to prevent ATF data from being used to sue gun companies. Despite these two legislative attempts to end the case, the case remains active.

== Urban reconstruction ==
Following up from an initiative started with the Walt Disney Company by the Dinkins administration, and preceded by planning and eminent domain seizures that went back to the Koch administration, under Giuliani the Times Square redevelopment project saw Times Square transformed from a center for small privately owned businesses such as tourist attractions, game parlors, and peep shows, to a district where media outlets and studios, theaters, financial companies, and restaurants predominate, including MTV Studios, an ESPN Zone, and (formerly) a large Virgin Megastore and theater. A few city councilmembers voted against the reasoning that led to the change, partly because they did not want to see the sex shops dispersed to other neighborhoods.

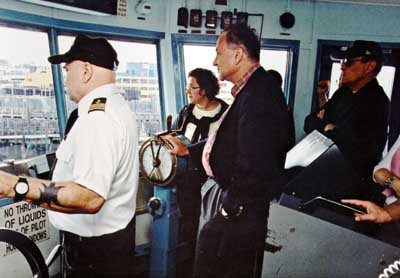
Commissioner Iris Weinshall, federal legislator Chuck Schumer and his wife, and Giuliani on a ferry boat in the East River

Throughout his term, Giuliani also pursued the construction of a new sports stadium in Manhattan, a goal in which he did not succeed, though new minor league baseball stadiums opened in Brooklyn, for the Brooklyn Cyclones, and in Staten Island, for the Staten Island Yankees. Conversely, Giuliani refused to attend the opening ceremonies for a Dinkins success, Arthur Ashe Stadium in Flushing Meadows, Queens, stating his anger with a contract that fines the city if planes from LaGuardia Airport fly over the stadium during U.S. Open matches. Giuliani boycotted the U.S. Open throughout his mayoralty. The tennis deal negotiated by the Dinkins administration, under which the City of New York receives a percentage of gross revenues from the U.S. Open, brings more economic benefit to the City of New York each year than the New York Yankees, New York Mets, New York Knicks and New York Rangers combined. New York City Mayor Michael Bloomberg proclaimed several years ago that it was "the only good athletic sports stadium deal, not just in New York but in the country."

== Budget management ==
Rudy Giuliani received an honorary key to Miami-Dade County from County Mayor Alex Penelas in September 1998

Mayor Giuliani inherited a $2.3 billion deficit from his predecessor, David Dinkins. During its first term, the Giuliani administration cut taxes, cut spending, and reduced the municipal payroll, thereby closing the budget gap. These measures, combined with the upward swing of the mid-late 1990s dot-com bubble, which especially benefited New York's financial sector, resulted in greatly increased tax revenues for the city by Giuliani's second term; soon there was a budget surplus of $3 billion. But city spending then rose 6.3 percent a year, above the inflation rate, and the city payroll increased again, especially for police officers and teachers.

== Health care ==
In 2000 Giuliani initiated what the New York Post called "a massive program" to get city employees to expand the number of low-income, uninsured children and adults covered by public health entitlement programs such as Medicaid, Child Health Plus and Family Health Plan. Promoting enrollment in his HealthStat program, Giuliani said at the time that the program could be "a model for the rest of this country for how to get people covered on the available health programs."

== Immigration and illegal immigration ==
As Mayor of New York City, Giuliani encouraged hardworking illegal immigrants to move to New York City. He said in 1994:

Some of the hardest-working and most productive people in this city are undocumented aliens. If you come here and you work hard and you happen to be in an undocumented status, you're one of the people who we want in this city. You're somebody that we want to protect, and we want you to get out from under what is often a life of being like a fugitive, which is really unfair."

In a Minneapolis speech two years later he defended his policy: "There are times when undocumented immigrants must have a substantial degree of protection." In 2000, Giuliani said of New York City, "Immigration is a very positive force for the City of New York. Immigration is the key to the city's success. Both historically and to this very day."

Giuliani also expressed doubt that the federal government can completely stop illegal immigration. Giuliani said that the Immigration and Naturalization Service "do nothing with those names but terrorize people." In 1996 he said that the new anti-illegal immigration law, as well as the Welfare Reform Act, were "inherently unfair." In 1996, Giuliani said, "I believe the anti-immigration movement in America is one of our most serious public problems." In the same year he said, "We're never, ever going to be able to totally control immigration in a country that is as large as ours." He went on to say, "If you were to totally control immigration into the United States, you might very well destroy the economy of the United States, because you'd have to inspect everything and everyone in every way possible."

== Media management ==
After he was elected mayor, Giuliani started a weekly call-in program on WABC radio. He avoided one-on-one interviews with the press, preferring to speak to them only at press conferences or on the steps of City Hall. He made frequent appearances on the Late Show with David Letterman television show, sometimes as a guest and sometimes participating in comedy segments. In one highly publicized appearance shortly after his election, Giuliani filled a pothole in the street outside the Ed Sullivan Theater.

Giuliani was not shy about his public persona; besides Letterman he appeared on many other talk shows during his time in office, hosted Saturday Night Live in 1997 and introduced it again when the show resumed broadcasting after September 11.

=== Radio show ===
From 1994 to 2001, Giuliani hosted the Live From City Hall With Rudy Giuliani show weekly on Friday mid-days on WABC radio. The show quickly became known for Giuliani's "bullying therapist" approach to callers, and gained the second-largest audience on AM radio in its time slot.

Some of each program was devoted to discussing current city events, or to Giuliani's political philosophies. Then calls from the public were taken; many were from citizens with problems that Giuliani was sympathetic to and enlisted help for. But when Giuliani disagreed with a caller, he let them know it. While Giuliani's debate with the ferret fan described above became the show's most well-remembered exchange, there were many others, on a wide variety of topics: a complaint about handling of the Amadou Diallo case brought the Giuliani response "Either you don't read the newspapers carefully enough or you're so prejudiced and biased that you block out the truth"; a query about parking privileges for a well-to-do firm received "Well, let me give you another view of that rather than the sort of Marxist class concept that you're introducing"; a question about flag handling brought "Isn't there something more important that you want to ask me?"; and in commentary about dog owners who do not clean up after their pets, Giuliani said such people have "a whole host of other problems that play out in their personalities."

Sometimes the baiting went both ways. As depicted in the documentary Giuliani Time, Parkinson's disease patient John Hynes called Giuliani's show in January 2000 to complain about being cut off from Medicaid after paying more than $100,000 of taxes in his life before he was disabled with the disease. Hynes accused the New York City Human Resources Administration of repeatedly opening fraud investigations on him, then dropping the case for lack of evidence, only to re-open it. Hynes told Giuliani, "The biggest thing you could do to reduce crime would be to resign, sir. Crime would drop like a rock if you resigned. You're the biggest criminal in the city." Giuliani responded, "What kind of little hole are you in there, John? It sounds like you are in a little hole. JOHN! Are you okay there? You're breathing funny." Hynes replied: "No, I'm not okay. I'm sick, and you cut me off my food stamps and Medicaid several times; but I suppose you don't give a damn about that either." Giuliani replied, "There's something really wrong with you there, John. I can hear it in your voice. ... Now, why don't you stay on the line. We'll take your name and your number and we'll send you psychiatric help, 'cause you seriously need it." After Hynes hung up, Giuliani continued, "Man! Look, it's a big city, and you get some real weirdos who hang out in this city, and that's what I was worried about on, uh, New Year's Eve. I wasn't, you know – I figured, the terrorist groups and all that we could keep under control – worried, but who knows what, what's living in some cave somewhere. So, uh, and John called up. John calls up from Queens, but who knows where he's from." Hynes subsequently said, "Mr. Giuliani showed a total lack of respect for all disabled people when he mocked me after I revealed that I was sick."

=== Drag appearances ===
Giuliani was the most visible cross-dressing New York politician since Lord Cornbury and was frequently described as such in the press during his term and in assessments of his mayoralty since.

Giuliani and Donald Trump in a film clip shown at the 2000 New York Inner Circle press dinner

Giuliani performed in public dressed in women's clothing three times, and almost a fourth:

- On March 1, 1997, at the New York Inner Circle press dinner, an annual event in which New York politicians and the press corps stage skits, roast each other and make fun of themselves, with proceeds going to charity. In his appearance he first imitated Marilyn Monroe. Then, he appeared in a spoofing stage skit "Rudy/Rudia" together with Julie Andrews, starring at the time on Broadway in the cross-dressing classic Victor Victoria (about a woman pretending to be a man pretending to be a woman). Under his drag name "Rudia" and wearing a spangled pink gown, Giuliani said he was "a Republican pretending to be a Democrat pretending to be a Republican."
- On November 22, 1997, hosting Saturday Night Live, he played an Italian American grandmother in a bright floral dress during a long sketch that satirized Italian-American family rites at Thanksgiving time.
- On March 11, 2000, at another Inner Circle dinner, he was on stage in male disco garb spoofing John Travolta in Saturday Night Fever, but also appeared in drag in taped video clips that reworked the "Rudy/Rudia" theme again. These included a bit in which he flirts with (normally dressed) real estate mogul (and future President of the United States) Donald Trump, then slaps Trump for trying to get too "familiar" with him, and an exchange with Joan Rivers that sought to make fun of his then-Senate race rival and fellow dinner attendee Hillary Clinton.
- In October 2001, Giuliani agreed to appear in drag on the gay-themed television series Queer as Folk to raise aid money for gays and lesbians affected by the September 11 attacks, saying "If it means more money for relief funds, sure." However, the appearance never took place.

Elliot Cuker, a friend and advisor to Giuliani, told The New Yorker, "I am the one who convinced him that it would be a great idea to put him in a dress, soften him up, and help him get the gay vote."

== Actions related to foreign policy ==
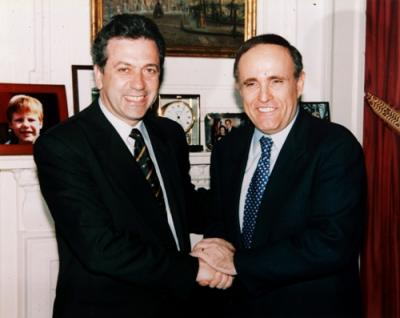
Giuliani exchanging a handshake with Greek politician Dimitris Avramopoulos, the then-mayor of Athens

In 1995, Giuliani made national headlines by ordering PLO Chairman Yasser Arafat ejected from a Lincoln Center concert held in celebration of the 50th anniversary of the founding of the United Nations. While Giuliani called Arafat an uninvited guest, Arafat said he did hold a ticket to the invitation-only concert, which was the largest such gathering of world leaders ever held. "Maybe we should wake people up to the way this terrorist is being romanticized," Giuliani said, and noted that Arafat's Palestinianian Liberation Organization had been linked to the murder of American civilians and diplomatic personnel. President Clinton protested the ejection. The New York Times criticized Giuliani's action in an editorial, saying that Arafat had met with Jewish leaders earlier that day and held a Nobel Peace Prize: "It is fortunate that New York City does not need a foreign policy, because Mayor Rudolph Giuliani, who evicted Yasir Arafat from a city-sponsored concert for United Nations dignitaries on Monday night, clearly lacks the diplomatic touch ... The proper role of New York, as the UN's home city, is to play gracious host to all of the 140 or so world leaders present for the organization's gala 50th birthday celebrations ... In fact, he has needlessly embarrassed the city at a moment when New York's hospitality should be allowed to shine." Lawrence Rubin, executive vice chairman of the National Jewish Community Relations Council, said that Giuliani's actions were solely for political reasons and did not help the Israeli-Palestinian peace negotiations; he pointed out that Israel regularly met with the Palestinian leader in peace negotiations.

== Brooklyn Museum art battle ==
In 1999, Giuliani threatened to cut off city funding for the Brooklyn Museum if it did not remove a number of works in an exhibit entitled "Sensation: Young British Artists from the Saatchi Collection." One work in particular, The Holy Virgin Mary by Turner Prize-winning artist Chris Ofili, featured an image of an African Virgin Mary on a canvas decorated with shaped elephant dung and pictures of female genitalia. Giuliani's position was that the museum's display of such works amounted to a government-supported attack on Christianity; the artist, who claimed to be referring to African cultural tropes, Ofili decided to say nothing. He stated "I just thought, what's the point of throwing anything out there at all? I've already done the painting and they're going to work that to mincemeat. It was this American rage. I was brought up in Britain, I don't know that level of rage. So it was easier and perhaps more interesting not to say anything. I'm still glad I didn't".

In its defense, the museum filed a lawsuit, charging Giuliani with violating the First Amendment right to freedom of speech. Religious groups such as the Catholic League for Religious and Civil Rights supported the mayor's actions, while they were condemned by groups such as the American Civil Liberties Union, accusing the mayor of censorship. The museum's lawsuit was successful; the mayor was ordered to resume funding, and the judge, Federal District Judge Nina Gershon, declared: "There is no federal constitutional issue more grave than the effort by government officials to censor works of expression and to threaten the vitality of a major cultural institution as punishment for failing to abide by governmental demands for orthodoxy."

== Gay rights ==
During Giuliani's mayoralty, gays and lesbians in New York asked for domestic partnership rights. Giuliani in turn pushed the Democratic-controlled City Council to pass legislation providing broad protection for same-sex partners. In 1998, he signed the local law that granted all city employees equal benefits for their domestic partners. Empire State Pride Agenda, an LGBT political advocacy group, described the law as "a new national benchmark for domestic partner recognition."

== Ferret ban ==
Giuliani vetoed a bill legalizing the ownership of ferrets as pets in the city, saying that it was akin to legalizing tigers. He sent a memorandum, "Talking Points Against the Legalization of Ferrets," to City Council members saying that ferrets should be banned just as pythons and lions are in the city. Councilman A. Gifford Miller said afterwards that Giuliani's "administration has gone out of its way to invent a ridiculous policy." The editor of Modern Ferret magazine testified that ferrets are domesticated animals that do not live in the wild and whose natural habitat is within people's homes. She argued that no case of ferrets transferring rabies to humans had ever occurred and that the legalization bill would require ferrets to be vaccinated against rabies as dogs are. She later wrote that at the public hearings proposing to ban ferrets, no citizen or veterinarian spoke against ferrets, only representatives from the Department of Health, City Council, and Mayor Giuliani himself.

David Guthartz, founder of the Society for the Prevention of Cruelty to Ferrets, called a radio show Giuliani was hosting to complain about the citywide ban. Giuliani responded:

There is something deranged about you. ... The excessive concern you have for ferrets is something you should examine with a therapist. ... There is something really, really very sad about you. ... This excessive concern with little weasels is a sickness. ... You should go consult a psychologist. ... Your compulsion about – your excessive concern with it is a sign that there is something wrong in your personality. ... You have a sickness, and I know it's hard for you to accept that. ... You need help.

In 2015, the New York City Bar Association’s Animal Law Committee petitioned the New York City Board of Health to repeal the ban on ferrets but the appeal did not succeed. Of 10 board members, there had to be a minimum of six votes for the bill to pass. Five members abstained from voting while two members voted in favor and three members voted against the appeal. In reaction to the revisitation of the ferret ban, Giuliani said that he would be alright with removing the ban as long as the Board of Health concludes that ferrets are safe to own as pets.

== Sports teams ==
Giuliani's son Andrew first became a familiar sight by misbehaving at Giuliani's first mayoral inauguration, then with his father, five months after the inauguration when the New York Rangers won game seven of the Stanley Cup Final, as Giuliani and his son were at the game at Madison Square Garden. The Rangers' Stanley Cup win in 1994—first in 54 years—made Giuliani the first New York City mayor to witness a first New York sports team championship victory during their first year in office since Ed Koch when the New York Yankees, of which Rudy Giuliani is an enthusiastic fan, won the 1978 World Series.

Father and son were often seen at Yankees games. Giuliani has also been to games of the New York Mets as well, including their season openers in 1996, when he threw out the ceremonial first pitch along with the Governor of New York George Pataki, and in 1998, and when the Mets hosted the first professional sporting event in New York since September 11, 2001. Giuliani said about rooting for the Mets: "I'm a Yankee fan overall, but I root for the Mets in the National League, certainly against the (Philadelphia) Phillies (Mets' primary rivals)."

On May 8, 2007, The Village Voice published a feature questioning whether Giuliani might have received gifts from the New York Yankees baseball team that violated a city ordinance against receipt of gifts by public officials. The gifts possibly included tickets, souvenirs, and World Series rings from 1996, 1998, 1999, and 2000. However, the Yankees' public relations firm produced documents that the rings were sold to Giuliani for a total of $16,000 in 2003 and 2004, although this departs from usual industry practice. The article further questioned whether Giuliani properly reported these gifts or paid any necessary taxes on the gifts. The rings have been estimated to have a market value of $200,000, and the tickets to box and Legends seats a value of $120,000. Much of this information was substantiated by a subsequent May 12 New York Times report. The New York Times described Giuliani's role during his mayoral term as "First Fan" and "the team's landlord," providing the public Yankee Stadium to the franchise for a rent lower than that paid by residents of the adjacent St. Mary's public housing project.

== Criticisms and controversies ==
=== Relations with the homeless ===
During his 1993 campaign, Giuliani proposed to drastically curtail city services for the homeless, setting a limit of 90 days for stays in shelters. Opponent Dinkins accused Giuliani of punishing the children of the homeless with the policy. This contrasted with Giuliani's campaign promise during the 1989 campaign to build hundreds of new homeless shelters around the city. Advocates for the homeless sued the mayor over an alleged failure to provide proper medical treatment to homeless children.

During the Giuliani administration, police conducted sweeps of parks and other public places to arrest homeless people and move them to shelters. Critics charged that the purpose was not to help the homeless but to remove them from sight. The pastor of Fifth Avenue Presbyterian Church, Reverend Thomas Tewell, said: "I think the police and the administration in New York were a bit embarrassed to have homeless people on the steps of a church in such an affluent area. The city said to us that it's inhumane to have people staying on the streets. And my response was that it's also inhumane to just move them along to another place or to put them in a shelter where they are going to get beat up, or abused, or harassed." The church sued the city of New York, Giuliani, and Bernard Kerik, asserting a First Amendment right to minister to the homeless on its steps.

In 1998, when the City Council overrode Giuliani's veto to change how homeless shelters were run, Giuliani served an eviction notice on five community service programs, including a program for the mentally ill, a day-care center, an elderly agency, a community board office and a civic association in favor of a homeless shelter. Giuliani asserted he specifically chose the site because it was in the district of chief bill sponsor Stephen DiBrienza. The plan came under heavy criticism, especially for the eviction of the program serving 500 mentally ill patients, and Giuliani backed down. In an editorial, The New York Times called the event a "dispiriting political vendetta" and asserted that "selecting sites [for homeless shelters] as a punishment for crossing the Mayor is outrageous."

=== Race relations ===
A well-known Harlem minister, Calvin O. Butts, who had previously supported Giuliani for re-election, said of the mayor, "I don't believe he likes black people. And I believe there's something fundamentally wrong in the way we are disregarded, the way we are mistreated, and the way our communities are being devastated. I had some hope that he was the kind of person you could deal with. I've just about lost that hope." After the minister criticized him, Giuliani diverted funds away from projects connected to him, and when Butts supported Governor George Pataki's re-election, Giuliani told Pataki he should not accept Butts' support. (Pataki did accept the endorsement.)

Giuliani said that by not dealing with black leaders, he could "accomplish more for the black community." State Comptroller H. Carl McCall, who is black, claimed that Giuliani ignored his requests to meet for years, and then met with him after the Amadou Diallo shooting "for show." Queens Congressman Gregory Meeks said that he never met or talked with Giuliani in his entire eight years in office.

Giuliani's schools chancellor, Rudy Crew, an African-American, later said, "I find his policies to be so racist and class-biased. I don't even know how I lasted three years. ... He was barren, completely emotionally barren, on the issue of race."

Giuliani has been accused of supporting racial profiling, specifically in the shooting death of Amadou Diallo, a West African immigrant, by the NYPD under his watch. Many African Americans were outraged by Patrick Dorismond's death.

=== Public schools ===
==== General policy goals ====
One of Giuliani's three major campaign promises was to fix public schools. However, he cut the public school budget in New York City by $2 billion from 1994 to 1997 and trimmed the school repairs budget by $4.7 billion, and test scores declined during his terms. His successor Michael Bloomberg later said, "Giuliani never got his hands around the school system. There is no question that it's gotten worse the last eight years, not better." Giuliani has been accused of diverting funds for school repair from poor districts to middle-class ones. A large debt left after the Giuliani administration has resulted in less money to spend on education, according to some sources.

==== Relations with the Board of Education ====
Giuliani expressed frustration with the New York City Board of Education. In April 1999, two days after the Columbine massacre, he stated that he would like to "blow up" the Board of Education. Conflict between Giuliani and schools chancellor Ramon C. Cortines over some of the mayor's proposals for public education eventually resulted in Cortines' resignation. However, the decision on the policies was not up to City Hall, but the Board of Education. In particular, Giuliani supported a for-profit privatization plan for public schools that parents voted against. Cortines and Giuliani had however been able to agree on a plan to privatize school maintenance and repair that earned praise from The New York Times.

Cortines was the first of three school chancellors, all people of color who left office during Giuliani's tenure. Cortines, Mexican-American and gay, resigned after a spat in which Giuliani told the press Cortines should not "be so precious" and called him "the little victim," terms that many later felt had a gay-baiting tone. Cortines said that Giuliani was intolerant of ideas other than his and demanded total conformity from those he worked with: "He's made it very clear that no matter what I do or say, unless I acquiesce to all of his wishes, that I am not a good manager and I am not showing good leadership."

Cortines' replacement as schools chancellor, Rudy Crew, had been a close friend of Giuliani's for years, but their relationship soured over the issue of school vouchers. Giuliani had said in his 1993 campaign that parochial school vouchers were "unconstitutional." Yet in 1999 he placed $12 million into the budget for parochial school vouchers. Crew felt that Giuliani began pressuring him to leave immediately they were on less friendly terms. The day of Crew's wife's funeral, Giuliani leaked a letter to the tabloids and Crew fielded press calls before leaving to deliver her eulogy. He later told a Giuliani biographer: "This is a maniac. On the day I was burying my wife, I have these people concocting this world of treachery. ... When Rudy sees a need to take someone out, he has a machine, a roomful of henchmen, nicking away at you, leaking crazy stories. He is not bound by the truth. I have studied animal life, and their predator/prey relations are more graceful than his." Of Giuliani's disagreement with Chancellor Crew, former Mayor Ed Koch said, "It's like his goal in life is to spear people, destroy them, to go for the jugular. Why do this to Crew? And I'm not a fan of Crew." Some speculated that Giuliani pursued the issue of vouchers at the expense of his relationship with Crew because he was looking towards an upcoming Senate run.

When the city's five-year contract with schoolteachers ran out and negotiations with the city had not yet begun, teachers' union president Randi Weingarten said that a strike was not off the table if the city did not offer a contract. Giuliani told the press that he would put Weingarten in jail if she led a strike; under New York state law, government employees could not strike. Weingarten said that she would lobby the state legislature to allow employees to strike if the government had refused to negotiate in good faith. Giuliani objected to the teachers' request for a pay raise to align their salaries with those in the suburbs. Teachers pointed out the city's then budget surplus and the number of teachers leaving the city. Giuliani called for merit pay based on student test scores, a plan which was derided by teachers as ineffective.

=== Opposition to federal immigration law ===
Giuliani was criticized for embracing illegal immigrants because of his continuation of a sanctuary city policy of preventing city employees from contacting the Immigration and Naturalization Service about immigration violations, on the grounds that illegal aliens must be able to take actions such as sending their children to school or reporting crime and violations without fear of deportation. In 1996 Giuliani sued the federal government over a new federal law (Illegal Immigration Reform and Immigrant Responsibility Act of 1996) that overturned the 1985 executive order by then mayor Ed Koch that barred government employees from turning in illegal immigrants who were trying to get government benefits from the city. He ordered city attorneys to defend this policy in federal court. His lawsuit claimed that the new federal requirement to report illegal immigrants violated the Tenth Amendment. The court ruled that New York City's sanctuary laws were illegal. After the City of New York lost an appeal to the United States Supreme Court in 2000, Giuliani vowed to ignore the law.

=== Role of press staff professionals ===
Giuliani's spokeswoman, Cristyne F. Lategano (who would later deny allegations of an affair with her boss when his wife said Lategano's relationship with him had damaged her marriage), admitted that she and her staff refused to allow the mayor to conduct interviews with reporters who she thought would not be sympathetic to his views. Some reporters alleged that she had kept information from the public with her actions. After the police spokesman, John Miller, resigned in 1995, he said that Giuliani's press office had forgotten that public information was public. Some City Hall reporters maintained they were harassed by Lategano if they wrote something she found unflattering and that she called them late at night. Giuliani defended her, saying that he did not care whether his press secretary pleased reporters, and at one point gave Lategano a higher post as communications director and a $25,000 raise during a time when his office had called a budget crisis. In one incident, Lategano called newsrooms alleging improprieties by one of previous Mayor Dinkins' appointees. The allegations were later found to be false, and reporters said that the allegations by Lategano were meant to divert attention from tax improprieties of one of Giuliani's own appointees. The New York Times wrote that the incident "put a cloud over the integrity of the Giuliani press office, if not that of the administration itself."

Jerry Nachmann of WCBS-TV said of the Giuliani staff's intrusions with the media, "I say without regret and with no remorse that as editor of The New York Post I used to torture David Dinkins every day of his life. And there were calls. But the calls were never, 'Put the Mayor on before sports and weather.'"

Giuliani was also criticized for dismissing journalists who had been appointees of the Dinkins administration. John Miller, police department spokesman, was pressured to resign after publicly disagreeing with Giuliani's cutting of his staff and replacement of police officers with civilians.

=== Fox News conflict of interest ===
In 1996, The New York Times reported that Giuliani was threatening Time Warner to get them to carry Rupert Murdoch's new Fox News Channel on their cable network. Time Warner executive Ted Turner suggested that Giuliani had a conflict of interest because his wife, the broadcaster Donna Hanover, was employed by a television station owned by Murdoch.

In the wake of the unfolding Murdoch illegal surveillance and bribery scandals erupting in the US and UK, Giuliani was among a small number of public defenders of the accused Murdoch as "a very honorable, honest man" Giuliani was described by Federal Judge Denise Cote as having violated constitutional principles in an "improper" relationship with Murdoch's Fox News, and Giuliani's wife at the time benefited significantly financially from her employment at Fox.

=== Civil liberties ===
Litigants filed several civil liberties violations lawsuits against the mayor or the city. Giuliani's administration lost 22 of 26 cases.

Some of the court cases which found the Giuliani administration to have violated First Amendment rights included actions barring public events from their previous location at the City Hall steps, not allowing taxi drivers to assemble for a protest, not allowing city workers to speak to the press without permission, barring church members from delivering an AIDS education program in a park, denying a permit for a march to object to police brutality, issuing summons and seizing literature of three workers collecting signatures to get a candidate on the presidential ballot, imposing strict licensing restrictions on sidewalk artists that were struck down by a court of appeals as a violation of artists' rights, using a 1926 cabaret law to ban dancing in bars and clubs, imposing an excessive daily fee on street musicians, imposing varying city fees for newsstand owners based on the content they sold, a case against Time Warner Cable, and an incident in which Giuliani ordered an ad for New York magazine that featured his image taken down from city buses. The ad featured a copy of the magazine with the caption, "Possibly the only good thing Rudy hasn't taken credit for."

Giuliani and his administration encountered accusations of blocking free speech arising from a lawsuit brought by Fifth Avenue Presbyterian Church for removing the homeless from the church's steps against the church's will, and during his 1993 campaign, when he criticized incumbent Mayor Dinkins for allowing Louis Farrakhan to speak in the city. After being criticized for impinging on freedom of speech, he backed down from his criticism of Dinkins.

In 1998, 1999, and 2000, Mayor Giuliani received a "Muzzle Award" from the Thomas Jefferson Center for the Protection of Free Expression in Charlottesville, Virginia. The Muzzles are "awarded as a means to draw national attention to abridgments of free speech." The 1999 award was the Center's first "Lifetime Muzzle Award," which noted he had "stifled speech and press to so unprecedented a degree, and in so many and varied forms, that simply keeping up with the city's censorious activity has proved a challenge for defenders of free expression."

More than 35 successful lawsuits were brought against Giuliani and his administration for blocking free speech. In his book Speaking Freely, First Amendment lawyer Floyd Abrams said Giuliani had an "insistence on doing the one thing that the First Amendment most clearly forbids: using the power of government to restrict or punish speech critical of government itself."

=== Virginia trash controversy ===
On January 13, 1999, Giuliani suggested a "reciprocal relationship" whereby other states such as Virginia were obligated to accept New York City's garbage in exchange for being able to visit New York City's cultural sites. Then Governor of Virginia Jim Gilmore III wrote in response, "I am offended by your suggestion that New York's substantial cultural achievements, such as they are, obligate Virginia and other states to accept your garbage." Other politicians also were upset about the proposed arrangement. Virginia State Senator William T. Bolling said, "This represents a certain arrogant attitude that is not consistent with the way we do business in Virginia." Even owners of trash repositories and other businesses that would benefit from the deal spoke against the mayor's statements, saying they gave New Yorkers and Virginians a bad name and would harm their business in the long run. One such owner, Charles H. Carter III, said, "Giuliani couldn't have said anything that could have harmed his own cause more. He is definitely not presidential material."

A month earlier, Giuliani had similarly infuriated then New Jersey Governor Christine Todd Whitman when he announced a plan to ship garbage to New Jersey without consulting her beforehand. She issued a press release saying, "Whitman to New York's Garbage Plan: Drop Dead" and said the plan was "a direct assault on the beaches of New Jersey."

The situation arose when Giuliani closed New York City's existing landfill, Fresh Kills on Staten Island, calling it an "eyesore," although it contained 20 to 30 more years' worth of space for garbage. Critics alleged that the decision was made for purely political, rather than financial or environmental reasons. Staten Island had been an important constituency in electing Giuliani to his two terms, and would again be important if he ran for the Senate in 2000.

The plan to export trash was expensive and not environmentally friendly. A year after the landfill closed, New York City's sanitation commissioner said, "Fresh Kills was really closed without an awful lot of thought, you know, if the story be told." Garbage trucks taking trash out of the city were estimated to make an extra 700,000 trips a year. The New York State attorney general's office sued the city for not properly taking the environmental effects into account. The lawsuit alleged that air pollution along Canal Street, leading to the Holland Tunnel, had increased 16% due to the plan. Mayor Bloomberg now budgets $400 million a year to barge New York City's garbage to landfills in Virginia and Ohio. In five years, the city's trash budget rose from $631 million to more than $1 billion because of the garbage transfer costs. The city cut back on recycling to save money. The New York Times and Daily News have both run editorials calling for Fresh Kills to be re-opened.

== See also ==
- Political positions of Rudy Giuliani
- September 11, 2001 attacks
- William J. Bratton (former Police Commissioner of New York City)
- Rudy Crew (former Chancellor of Public Schools)
- David Dinkins (former Mayor of New York City)
- Bernard Kerik (former Police Commissioner of New York City)
- Howard Safir (former Police Commissioner of New York City)
- Peter Vallone (former Speaker of New York City Council)
- Thomas Von Essen (former Fire Commissioner of New York City)

== Notes ==
Political offices
Preceded by David Dinkins	Mayor of New York City; January 1, 1994 – December 31, 2001	Succeeded by Michael Bloomberg
