= Fantl =

Fantl is a surname. Notable people with the surname include:

- Jan Fantl (born 1954), German film producer
- Richard Fantl (1903–1961), American film editor
- Thomas Fantl (1928–2001), German film director and screenwriter

== See also ==
- Fanti
