= Rudy: The Rudy Giuliani Story =

- Genre: Biography; Drama
- Based on: Rudy!: An Investigative Biography of Rudolph Giuliani by Wayne Barrett
- Written by: Stanley Weiser
- Directed by: Robert Dornhelm
- Starring: James Woods; Penelope Ann Miller; Michelle Nolden; Jack Langedijk
- Music by: Harald Kloser
- Country of origin: United States
- Original language: English

Production
- Executive producers: Michael Braham; Jody Brockway; Stephen Davis; Jane Walmsley
- Producer: Mark Winemaker
- Cinematography: Serge Ladouceur
- Editor: Victor Du Bois
- Running time: 120 minutes
- Production companies: JAM Pictures; Carlton America

Original release
- Network: USA Network
- Release: March 20, 2003

Rudy: The Rudy Giuliani Story is an American television film produced and broadcast on March 20, 2003 on the USA Network. The movie stars James Woods as former New York City mayor Rudy Giuliani and depicts the life of Giuliani, focusing primarily on his mayoral career and response to the September 11 attacks.

The film was based on the 2000 biography Rudy!: An Investigative Biography of Rudolph Giuliani by Wayne Barrett. It has been broadcast in several countries.

== Cast ==
- James Woods as Rudy Giuliani
- Penelope Ann Miller as Donna Hanover
- Michelle Nolden as Cristyne Lategano
- Philip Spensley as Howard Safer
- Jack Langedijk as William Bratton
- John Bourgeois as Peter Powers
- Kirsten Bishopric as Judith Nathan
- Mark Camacho as Tony Carbonetti
- Maxim Roy as Beth Petrone

The real Rudy Giuliani makes a cameo in the film as a construction worker.

== Reception ==
John Leonard of New York Magazine gave it a negative review and wrote: "Rudy seems to suggest that such passionate mood swings are nothing more than lint in the navel and wax in the ears of a Great Man being grandly operatic."

MaryAnn Johanson of Flick Filosopher thought the film came too soon after September 11, 2001 for real perspective and said the film "suffers from a shallowness and a rushed kind of hagiography".

In November 2020, thousands of social media users rediscovered the film and began mocking it, both for its poor quality and in light of Giuliani's career since its release.

In a 2006 interview with PARADE, Woods reported that Giuliani met with him after the network premiere and praised his performance in the film.

=== Awards and nominations ===
Emmy Awards

- 2003: Nominated, "Outstanding Lead Actor in a Miniseries or a Movie" - James Woods
- 2003: Nominated, "Outstanding Makeup for a Miniseries, Movie or a Special (Non-Prosthetic)" - Jocelyne Bellemare, Stephan Dupuis, Cécile Rigault, Matthew W. Mungle

Satellite Awards

- 2004: Won, "Best Motion Picture Made for Television"
- 2004: Won, "Best Performance by an Actor in a Miniseries or a Motion Picture Made for Television" - James Woods

Writers Guild of America Awards

- 2004: Nominated, "Adapted Long Form" - Stanley Weiser
