= A Further Gesture =

- Directed by: Robert Dornhelm
- Starring: Stephen Rea; Alfred Molina; Rosana Pastor
- Release date: 20 February 1998
- Running time: 96 minutes
- Country: United Kingdom
- Language: English

A Further Gesture is a 1997 film directed by Robert Dornhelm. It stars Stephen Rea and Alfred Molina and had its première at the 12th Dublin Film Festival on 4 March 1997. It is also known as The Break.

== Cast ==
- Stephen Rea as Sean Dowd
- Alfred Molina as Tulio
- Rosana Pastor as Monica
- Brendan Gleeson as Richard
- Jorge Sanz as Paco
