= Amanda Knox: Murder on Trial in Italy =

2011 American true crime television film

- Promotional poster
- Genre: True crime
- Written by: Wendy Battles
- Directed by: Robert Dornhelm
- Starring: Hayden Panettiere; Vincent Riotta; Paolo Romio; Marcia Gay Harden
- Music by: Zack Ryan
- Country of origin: United States
- Original languages: English; Italian

Production
- Producer: Randy Sutter
- Cinematography: Gian Enrico Bianchi
- Editor: Michael Brown
- Camera setup: Multi-camera setup
- Running time: 87 minutes
- Production companies: Pilgrim Films & Television; Craig Anderson Productions; Keston Productions

Original release
- Network: Lifetime
- Release: February 21, 2011

Amanda Knox: Murder on Trial in Italy (also known as The Amanda Knox Story) is a 2011 American true crime television film. It stars Hayden Panettiere as Amanda Knox, Paolo Romio as Raffaele Sollecito, Djibril Kébé as Rudy Guede and Amanda Fernando Stevens as Meredith Kercher, and first aired on the Lifetime network on February 21, 2011.

Set between 2007 and 2009, Amanda Knox: Murder on Trial in Italy is based on the murder of Meredith Kercher in Perugia, Italy, and the subsequent trials of the suspects, Guede, Knox and Sollecito. It was written by Wendy Battles, who has worked on scripts for the American television series CSI: NY and Law & Order, and filmed in Rome, after officials refused to grant the production team permission to shoot in Perugia. The film contains a re-enactment of the murder. In Italy, the television film has been transmitted on Canale 5, on December 3, 2012, after Amanda Knox sent a team of lawyers to Mediaset, to prevent the airing.

After its first broadcast, the film was followed by a one-hour documentary, Beyond the Headlines: Amanda Knox, which examines the Italian judicial system and includes interviews with the parents and friends of Knox, investigators, prosecutors and legal scholars.

== Plot ==
The film depicts events that occurred after Amanda Knox moved to Perugia, Italy, in September 2007, as a foreign exchange student attending language classes at the University for Foreigners.

Knox shares a flat in a cottage with Meredith Kercher, a British student, and two Italian women, Filomena and Laura. In October, Knox meets Raffaele Sollecito, an Italian student of computer engineering, at a classical music concert, and they start dating.

On November 1, Kercher is found stabbed to death in her bedroom. Police question both Knox and Sollecito. Meanwhile, the chief prosecutor of Perugia, Giuliano Mignini, discusses the case with the coroner and forensic investigators from Rome. The coroner mentions that multiple bruises were found on Kercher's body, which could indicate a struggle between Kercher and her murderer. The prosecutor inquires whether more than one person could have been involved in the fatal attack.

During Sollecito's interrogation, he is informed by police that telephone records indicate he has called the emergency number after the Polizia Postale arrived on the day Kercher's body was discovered. He asserts that Knox told him to say that she was not with him at the time of the murder, and that he had not "thought about the contradictions" in his alibi.

Police ask Knox to explain a text message that has been found on her cell phone. The officers claim that Knox had left the message for her employer, pub owner Patrick Lumumba, on the night of the murder to tell him she would meet him later. Several hours later, Knox states that she had met Lumumba in a local square, that they had gone to the cottage with Kercher, and that Lumumba had entered Kercher's room before her death.

Knox, Sollecito and Lumumba are arrested. Under police interrogation, his face swollen with bruises, Lumumba insists he is innocent. Some days later, he is released when a university professor reveals that he had been with him at a pub, and could not have been at the cottage at the time of the murder. Knox's parents travel to Italy to help their daughter, and hire lawyers to defend her.

The forensics team finds a bloody fingerprint at the crime scene that does not match the prints of either Knox or Sollecito. The resulting manhunt leads to the arrest of Rudy Guede, originally from the Côte d'Ivoire, whom Knox and Kercher had met weeks earlier. Guede later goes to trial and is found guilty of murder and sexual assault. Knox and Sollecito are indicted in the same court judgment.

Knox and Sollecito are tried jointly in 2009 on the charges of murder, sexual assault, staging a crime scene, and transporting a lethal knife. Luminol tests in the cottage hallway reveal footprints approximately the size of Knox's feet. DNA experts testify that Knox's blood was found on a bathroom tap, mixed with Kercher's. In Sollecito's apartment, police found a large kitchen knife with Knox's DNA on the handle. The prosecution insists that Knox had argued with Kercher and stabbed her, as presented in an hypothetical flashback set in Kercher's room.

The chief forensics investigator testifies that Sollecito's DNA was found on a metal clasp severed from the back strap of Kercher's bra (presented as being cut off with a knife in the flashback). Sollecito's attorney asks when the bra clasp was discovered. The investigator replies that it was photographed on the first day after the murder, but only collected 47 days later, during which time it had been moved from its original position and passed between the various members of the forensics team. Although the attorney claims that this small amount of DNA is possibly the result of contamination, the investigator replies that, with the exception of the clasp, only a cigarette butt in the kitchen held Sollecito's DNA, stating, "DNA does not fly around".

Eventually, in December 2009, the jury delivers a verdict of guilty: Knox is sentenced to 26 years in prison, Sollecito to 25 years. Knox's father reassures his daughter that he and her mother will appeal the verdict in a new trial. The film closes with a caption stating that the parents of the real-life Knox have both been charged with criminal slander for claiming that police had abused their daughter, and that they face three years' imprisonment if found guilty.

Note: The film is now shown with an amendment noting the subsequent acquittal of Knox and Sollecito on appeal.

== Cast ==
- Hayden Panettiere as Amanda Knox
- Vincent Riotta as Giuliano Mignini
- Paolo Romio as Raffaele Sollecito
- Marcia Gay Harden as Edda Mellas, Amanda's mother
- Amanda Fernando Stevens as Meredith Kercher
- Djibril Kébé as Rudy Guede
- Timothy Martin as Patrick Lumumba
- Heather Cave as Deanna Knox
- Clive Walton as Curt Knox
- Shoboo Kapoor as Arlene Kercher
- Mimosa Campironi as Filomena Romanelli
- Simonetta Solder as Detective Navarra
- Fausto Maria Sciarappa as Detective Alicastro
- Valentina Carnelutti as Dr. Patrizia Stefanoni
- Francesco De Vito as Inspector Battistelli
- Stefano Santospago as Lawyer Giordano
- Matthew Reynolds as British Reporter

=== Casting ===
Actresses Lindsay Lohan, Megan Fox, Emily Blunt and Kristen Stewart were all considered for the part of Knox prior to the casting of Panettiere.

== Reception ==
=== Reactions ===
On February 3, 2011, Kercher's parents, John and Arline Kercher, described certain scenes in the film as "very distressing". John stated "They are absolutely horrific and I have asked and would hope the pictures are withdrawn" in reference to the scenes in which Kercher is attacked and murdered by her friends. Arline said, "It's awful what these film people have done. Your imagination runs riot as it is about what happened, but to actually see it like this is very different and very distressing. I'm surprised they have gone so far. I was told the original brief and synopsis of the film was to take it up to the point of the killing but not actually show the killing itself. It's obvious from these pictures they are showing the killing. So not only have they upset me and my family but they are also now in extreme danger of being sued by the convicted people's lawyers. In Italy you are regarded as still not being completely convicted until you have had two appeals. If these people win their appeals – which I hope they won't – then they could sue the filmmakers." Kercher's lawyer, Francesco Maresca, expressed his displeasure at the making of the film: "It is inopportune as the trial is still ongoing with two further appeals." Lawyers for Knox and Sollecito formally demanded that Lifetime abandon the production.

=== Critical response ===
On its first airing, the film achieved decent ratings of approximately 2.8 million viewers in the United States. According to The Daily Telegraph, the production of the film would always have been complicated since the case itself contained much doubt and many inconsistencies. Nick Squires of The Daily Telegraph wrote that the film did "a credible job of navigating a complex case without coming down one way or the other on whether Knox and ... Sollecito ... are innocent or guilty."

== Reported inaccuracies ==
Kercher's family and lawyers, Knox and her family, and Sollecito and his lawyers have all been vocal opponents of the film. Nikki Battiste of ABC News listed 15 points in the film when scenes or lines are fabricated.

=== Knox's relationships ===
The film portrays Knox and Sollecito having a picnic in an attempt to establish a relationship. There is no evidence that such a picnic took place, and the weather typical for Italy for the month of October makes the event improbable. The film also shows Knox, Kercher and Guede in attendance at a party featuring drug use. However, both Knox and Guede have stated they were not friends, and the Italian police have stated that there was no communication between them. In addition, the film depicts Kercher confronting Knox about not doing her fair share of house cleaning. In reality, Kercher's friends testified that she was too reserved to confront Knox about this issue.

=== Knox's statements ===
In the film, Knox informs her mother that she has been questioned for 13 hours. Knox was interrogated for almost 50 hours in the days prior to her arrest. The film depicts Knox, through the account of a roommate, telling the roommate that Kercher had suffered because her "throat was slit". This leads the prosecution to suspect Knox. Knox did not mention Kercher's throat being cut: in response to a question concerning whether Kercher had suffered, Knox stated, according to the witness, "Of course she suffered. She fucking bled to death."

=== Trial evidence ===
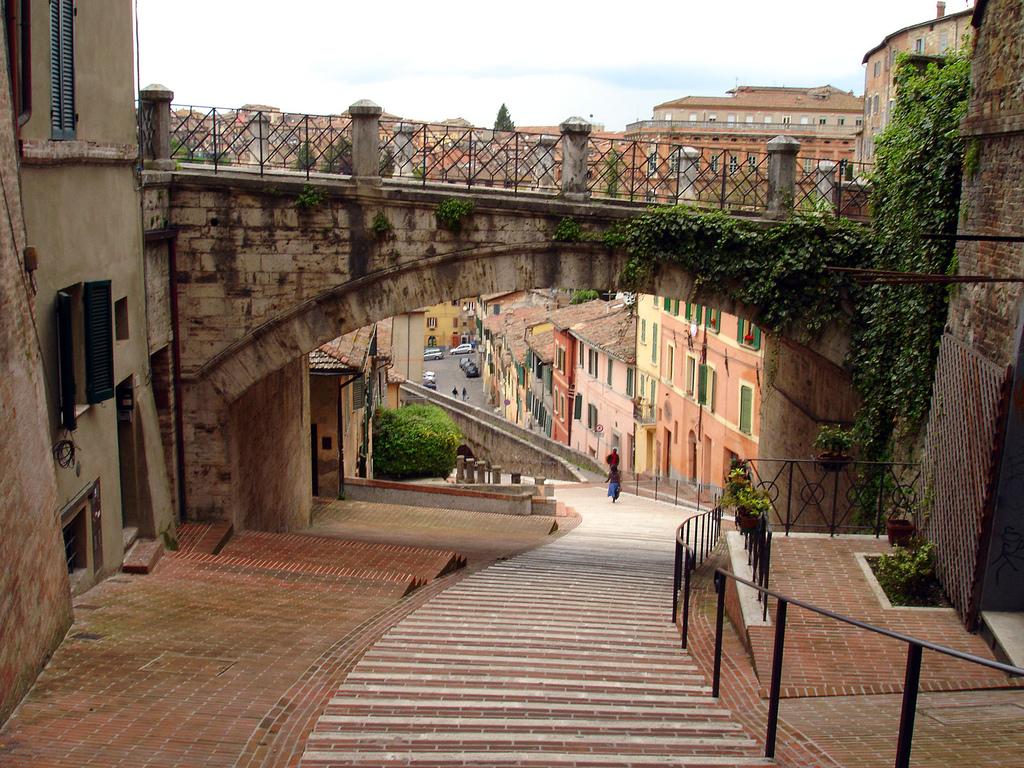
View of hillside steps in Perugia

The film indicates that police had found Kercher's DNA on the tip of the blade of a knife. The substance that the prosecution claimed included Kercher's DNA was found on the dull side of the blade. In the film, the prosecutor accuses Knox and Sollecito of returning to the murder scene hours later and cutting Kercher's bra from her body and moving the body to stage the crime scene. Neither at the trial nor in the investigation was anything found to indicate that Kercher's body had been moved or that the bra clasp had been removed hours after she died. The film presents the victim as being stabbed horizontally across the throat. Autopsy reports describe the wounds as stabs to the side or back of the neck, with smaller punctures to the front.

To prove the prosecutor's argument that the crime scene was staged, the film indicates that there was broken glass on top of clothes in crime scene photographs. No such photographs exist. In the film, a shop owner contacts the police immediately to tell them that Knox bought some cleaning supplies from him on the morning of the murder. When the witness was originally questioned by police, he did not mention that Knox was in the store and the other worker at the shop testified that Knox was not present at that time. Furthermore, the shop owner did not contact the prosecutor until he was encouraged to do so by reporters months after the murder.

=== Trial events ===
In the film, Knox enters the court on a red carpet, dressed in what Battiste describes as a "sexually suggestive" manner, and waving to the reporters. Knox was generally brought in through the rear entrance of the courthouse to avoid the press, and the courthouse does not have a red carpet. Additionally, Knox did not, in Battiste's view, dress in a provocative manner and did not wave to the media. The film portrays Knox and Sollecito sitting near each other and sharing shifty looks during the trial, when in reality they sat farther apart.

In the film, judge Micheli reads the ruling of the sentence as President of a Court composed by himself, two other professional judges (magistrates), and 6 lay judges (members chosen from citizens): in reality he ruled as single judge (as judge for the preliminary hearing). Moreover, the preliminary hearing was also held without the presence of journalists and general audience.

The trial regarding Knox and Sollecito is represented as held in front of a Court composed of 9 judges (3 magistrates and 6 lay judges): actually the Italian legal system does not contemplate this composition. The trial was held in front of a "Corte d'Assise", composed of a panel of two professional judges and six lay judges.

== See also ==
- Television in the United States
