= Giuliani Time =

2005 film

- Directed by: Kevin Keating
- Produced by: Kevin Keating; Williams Cole
- Music by: David Carbonara
- Production company: K Video Productions
- Distributed by: Cinema Libre Studio
- Release dates: January 31, 2005 (International Film Festival Rotterdam); May 12, 2006 (United States)
- Running time: 118 minutes
- Country: United States
- Language: English

Giuliani Time is a 2005 documentary film by Kevin Keating about Rudy Giuliani, former mayor of New York City. Giuliani Time is distributed by Cinema Libre Studio. A special election version of the film was released on May 2, 2008.

== Title ==
The documentary's title is a reference to a phrase that police officers allegedly uttered to Abner Louima when they tortured him in a Brooklyn police precinct house. Louima himself later recanted that statement, saying he had made it up. The phrase was also used by John Shaft in the 2000 remake of Shaft.

== Reception ==
The Village Voice called the documentary "an incisive portrait of power seizure and class combat as it was performed, by the numbers, on the municipal level." The film contains several archival segments, as well as interviews with Village Voice writer and unauthorized Giuliani biographer, Wayne Barrett and radio journalist Doug Henwood.

Giuliani Time has a rating of 85% positive at Rotten Tomatoes (22 fresh, 4 rotten).

=== Awards ===
- Silver Lake Film Festival, Best Documentary, 2006

== Featured New York City personalities ==
- Wayne Barrett, journalist
- Pete King, U.S. Congressman
- Gerald Lefcourt, lawyer
- Arthur Helton, Iraq War victim
- David Dinkins, former New York City mayor (1990–1993)
- Norman Siegel, lawyer
- Ed Koch, former New York City mayor (1978–1989)
- William Bratton, twice former NYPD police commissioner
- Rudy Crew, education administrator
- Ruth Messinger, politician
- Al Sharpton, civil rights activist
- Donald Trump, real estate developer and future President of the United States
- Charles King, politician

== Technical details ==
- MPAA rating: none
- Running time: 118 minutes

== See also ==
- Dust to Dust: The Health Effects of 9/11
- Juan Gonzalez
- Jack Newfield
