= Gerald B. Lefcourt =

American lawyer

Gerald Lefcourt
- Born: Gerald Bernard Lefcourt
- Education: Brooklyn Law School (JD)
- Occupation: Attorney
- Spouse(s): Ilene Sackler (divorced); Robin Lewis
- Children: 3

Gerald Bernard Lefcourt is an American criminal defense lawyer. He has represented a number of high-profile clients, including financier and registered sex offender Jeffrey Epstein, the Black Panthers, activist/author Abbie Hoffman, hotelier Harry Helmsley, former Speaker of the New York State Assembly Mel Miller, and actors Russell Crowe and Tracy Morgan.

== Biography ==
Lefcourt graduated from Brooklyn Law School in the class of 1967, and heads a firm in New York City that specializes in criminal defense. A high-profile trial lawyer, Lefcourt is a leading spokesman of the defense bar, a past President of the National Association of Criminal Defense Lawyers and the New York Criminal Bar Association, and a founder of the New York State Association of Criminal Defense Lawyers. Lefcourt is also a lecturer and panelist and has authored publications on legal subjects including asset forfeiture, legal ethics, wire-tapping, plea bargaining, subpoenas to lawyers, and representation of grand jury witnesses.

He was named as among the best trial attorneys in New York by the New York Law Journal's 1983 "Who's Who in Criminal Defense Bar", and received the New York State Bar's Outstanding Practitioner Award in 1985 and 1993, and the National Association of Criminal Defense Lawyers' highest honor, the Robert C. Heeney Memorial Award, in 1993. In 1997 he was presented the Thurgood Marshall Lifetime Achievement Award by The New York State Association of Criminal Defense Lawyers.

Lefcourt was a featured personality in the 2006 documentary Giuliani Time. His victories have included a full acquittal of rap mogul and Murder Inc. founder Irv Gotti on federal money laundering charges. Lefcourt was an attorney of "aider and abettor" non-KMPG employee David Amir Makov, in the 2008 federal KPMG tax shelter fraud prosecution, believed to be the largest tax fraud case ever brought in the history of the United States.

Lefcourt was part of Jeffrey Epstein's team of lawyers when Epstein was investigated by prosecutors. According to Bloomberg News, Lefcourt was part of an aggressive campaign to get higher-ups in the U.S. government to remove the prosecutor in the Epstein case, Marie Villafaña, after she subpoenaed records of Epstein's financial activities.

== Personal life ==
Lefcourt has been married twice. His first wife was Ilene Sackler Lefcourt, the daughter of Mortimer Sackler. Lefcourt has a son, Jeffrey Lefcourt (born 1972), and two daughters, Karen Lefcourt and Alison Lefcourt. Lefcourt is married to Robin Lewis Lefcourt.
