= August Schmölzer =

Austrian actor and writer

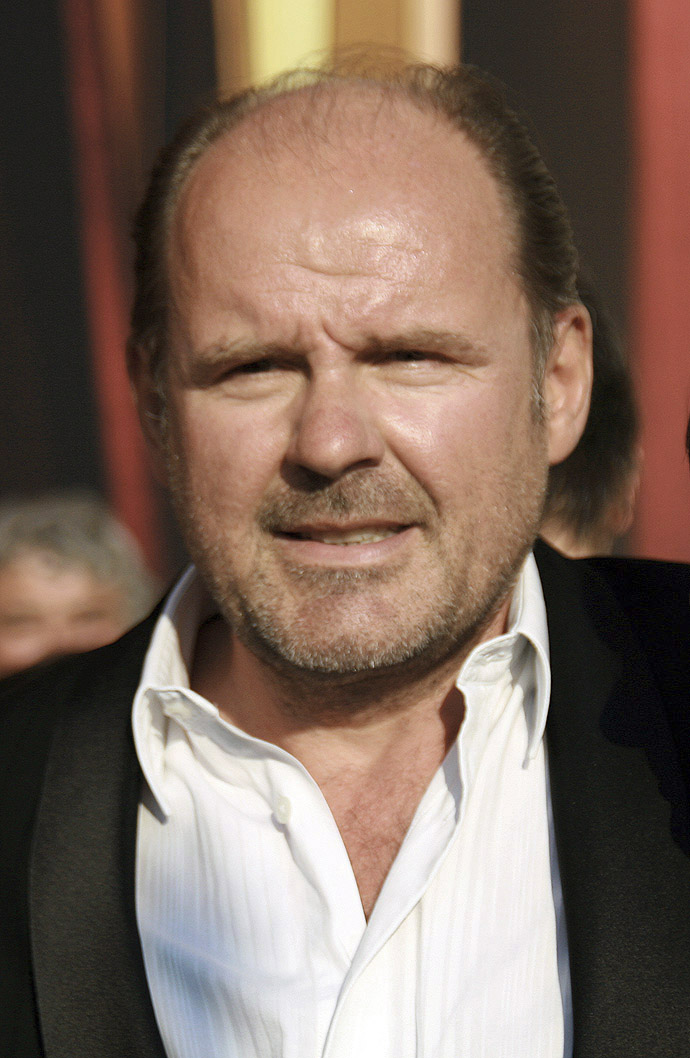
- August Schmölzer in 2009
- Born: June 27, 1958 (age 67); St. Stefan ob Stainz, Styria, Austria
- Occupations: Actor and writer
- Website: augustschmoelzer.com

August Schmölzer (born 27 June 1958) is an Austrian actor and writer.

== Biography ==
Schmölzer was born on June 27, 1958, into a farming family in St. Stefan ob Stainz in Styria, Austria. He initially training as a chef, completing a cooking apprenticeship. Schmölzer began studying acting in 1979 at the University of Music and Performing Arts Graz and later undertook further training at the Herbert Berghoff Studio in New York.

Following his graduation in Graz in 1982, he made his stage debut at the Heilbronn Theatre and went on to perform at venues including Theater in der Josefstadt in Vienna, the Salzburg Festival, and the Munich Residenz Theatre. From the late 1980s, he also established himself as a film and television actor, with early leading roles in productions such as Tunnelkind (1990) and Requiem for Dominic (1990). He later appeared in films including Schindler's List (1993), Der Unfisch (1997), Bandits (1997), and Downfall (2004), and had recurring roles in television series such as Julia – Eine ungewöhnliche Frau and Die Landärztin.

After Oktoberfest (2005), Schmölzer appeared less frequently in cinema, though he had roles in Ludwig II (2012), Erik & Erika (2018), and the films Marlene and Sleep (both 2020).

In addition to acting, Schmölzer has worked as an author, publishing both fiction and non-fiction, including his first novel in 2014, Am Ende wird alles sichtbar (English: In the end, everything will become clear), which was later adapted into a 2023 film of the same name. Schmölzer is also involved in charitable initiatives, founding an organisation in 2005 focused on supporting children and young people in education. In recognition of his humanitarian work, he was named Austrian of the Year in 2012 and received the Medal of Honour of the State of Styria in 2016.

== Filmography ==
Year	Title	Role	Notes
1985	Ausgeträumt	Hagenbach	
1990	Requiem for Dominic		
1990	Tunnelkind		
1991	Wolfgang A. Mozart	Schikaneder	
1992	Herr Ober!	Herr Pfau	
1993	The Lucona Affair	Dr. Brammer	
1993	Schindler's List	Obersturmführer Dieter Reeder	
1996	Tod im Paradies	Grienbaum	
1997	The Unfish	Bürgermeister	
1997	Bandits	Gunther	
1998	The Polar Bear	Heinz	
1998	Die 3 Posträuber		
1999	Ein einzelner Mord	Franz Hindenburg Wipfler	
2001	Bride of the Wind	Gustav Klimt	
2004	Slugs	Zuhälter	
2004	Deadly Diversion	Karl	
2004	Downfall	Baur	
2005	Oktoberfest	Max	
2005	Neun	Jürgen	
2007	The Hunt for Troy	Otto von Bismarck	
2010	Bell Canto	Heinrich Aberer	
2012	Ludwig II	Bernhard von Gudden	
2014	The Forest Killer	Matthias Leitgeb	
2018	Erik & Erika	Hubert Grassl	
2020	Sleep	Otto	
2020	Marlene	Boss	
2022	The Empress	Joseph Othmar von Rauscher	
