= The Children of Theatre Street =

1977 film

- DVD cover
- Directed by: Robert Dornhelm; Earle Mack
- Written by: Beth Gutcheon
- Produced by: Earle Mack
- Narrated by: Grace Kelly
- Cinematography: Karl Kofler
- Edited by: Tina Frese
- Distributed by: Peppercorn-Wormser Film Enterprises
- Release date: May 9, 1977
- Running time: 90 minutes
- Country: United States
- Language: English

The Children of Theatre Street is a 1977 American documentary film about the Vaganova Academy of Russian Ballet directed by Robert Dornhelm and Earle Mack, narrated by Grace Kelly.

== Reception ==
Time's Richard Schickel wrote that The Children of Theatre Street "never quite gets up on pointe", stating that the story is told in "a straightforward, quite artless manner." The New York Times' Janet Maslin also panned the movie, calling it "earnest, plodding and thoroughly earthbound, a fine illustration of how easy it is to demystify artistry by trying too hard to understand it."

The Children of Theatre Street was nominated for an Academy Award for Best Documentary Feature.

== Cast ==
- Angelina Armeiskaya as herself
- Michaela Cerna as herself
- Galina Mezenzewa as herself
- Konstantin Saklinsky as himself
- Alec Timoushin as himself
- Lena Voronzova as herself
