= Requiem for Dominic =

1990 film

- Directed by: Robert Dornhelm
- Written by: Michael Köhlmeier
- Produced by: Norbert Blecha
- Starring: Felix Mitterer
- Production companies: Terra Film Produktion; Österreichischer Rundfunk (ORF)
- Release date: September 1990 (Venice Film Festival)
- Running time: 85 minutes
- Countries: Austria; Germany; Romania
- Languages: German; Romanian; English; Hungarian

Requiem for Dominic (German: Requiem für Dominik) is a 1990 Austrian drama film directed by Robert Dornhelm. The film was selected as the Austrian entry for the Best Foreign Language Film at the 63rd Academy Awards, but was not accepted as a nominee.

== Cast ==
In alphabetical order

- Georg Hoffmann-Ostenhof
- Georg Metzenrad
- Felix Mitterer
- Werner Prinz
- Antonia Rados
- August Schmölzer
- Viktoria Schubert
- Nikolas Vogel

== See also ==
- List of submissions to the 63rd Academy Awards for Best Foreign Language Film
- List of Austrian submissions for the Academy Award for Best Foreign Language Film
