= The Venice Project =

- Directed by: Robert Dornhelm
- Written by: Nicholas Klein
- Produced by: Norbert Blecha; Kara Meyers
- Starring: Hector Babenco; Lauren Bacall; Gerd Böckmann; Stockard Channing; Ben Cross; Victoria Duffy; Anna Galiena; John Guare; Dennis Hopper; Lucia Hwong; Mía Maestro; Cheech Marin; Parker Posey; Linus Roache; Eddie Ruscha; Dean Stockwell; Stuart Townsend; Frederique van der Wal; John Wood
- Cinematography: Hugh B. Crum; Maurizio Dell'Orco; Hannes Drapal; Dan Gillham
- Edited by: Klaus Hundsbichler
- Music by: Harald Kloser; Thomas Wanker
- Production companies: Ozanit; Terra Film
- Release date: September 9, 1999 (Italy)
- Running time: 86 minutes
- Countries: United States; Austria
- Language: English

The Venice Project is a 1999 American-Austrian comedy film directed by Robert Dornhelm and starring Lauren Bacall and Dennis Hopper. It includes a cameo appearance from Steve Martin.

== Cast ==
- Lauren Bacall as Countess Camilla Volta
- Dennis Hopper as Roland / Salvatore
- Linus Roache as Count Jacko / Count Giaccomo
- Ben Cross as Rudy Mestry / Bishop Orsini
- Stuart Townsend as Lark / Gippo the Fool
- Héctor Babenco as Danilo Danuzzi
- Dean Stockwell as Sen. Campbell
- John Wood as The Viscount
- Stockard Channing as Chandra Chase
- Victoria Duffy as Jenna
- Anna Galiena as Maria/Sophia
- Mía Maestro as Danilla
- Parker Posey as Mira
- Frederique van der Wal as Alana/Lucrezia
- Eddie Ruscha as J.J. Rinquist
- Lucia Hwong as Lutist
- Gerd Böckmann as Pendergrass
- John Guare as himself
- Hans Hollein as himself
- Lauren Hutton as herself
- Cheech Marin as himself
- Steve Martin as himself
