= Spartan (film) =

2004 film by David Mamet

- Theatrical release poster
- Directed by: David Mamet
- Written by: David Mamet
- Produced by: David Bergstein; Moshe Diamant; Art Linson; Elie Samaha; Jan Fantl
- Starring: Val Kilmer; Derek Luke; William H. Macy; Ed O'Neill
- Cinematography: Juan Ruiz Anchía
- Edited by: Barbara Tulliver
- Music by: Mark Isham
- Production companies: Franchise Pictures; Apollo Media; QI Quality International
- Distributed by: Warner Bros. Pictures
- Release dates: January 31, 2004 (Bangkok International Film Festival); March 12, 2004 (United States)
- Running time: 107 minutes
- Countries: United States; Germany
- Language: English
- Budget: $12-13 million
- Box office: $8.1 million

Spartan is a 2004 American political thriller film written and directed by David Mamet and starring Val Kilmer, Derek Luke, Tia Texada, Ed O'Neill, William H. Macy, and Kristen Bell. It was released in the United States and Canada on March 12, 2004.

== Plot ==
Robert Scott is a former United States Marine Corps Force Recon master gunnery sergeant, acting as a selection cadre member for Delta Force. While observing an exercise designed to evaluate Delta candidates, Scott meets a recruit, Curtis, as well as Sergeant Jacqueline Black, a knife fighting instructor.

Scott is drawn into a clandestine operation to find Laura Newton, the President's daughter, who is missing. He and Curtis go to the beach house of one of Laura's professors, with whom she is said to have a relationship. They find neither person there but find two unidentified men who react aggressively, leading Curtis, who has taken up position outside with a sniper's rifle, to shoot one of the men. Scott quickly kills the other. An earlier lead takes them to a bar where girls are recruited as prostitutes, and Scott's team follows a middleman from the bar to a brothel that funnels some of these girls to an international sex slavery ring. The madam gives them a contact number leading to a pay phone.

Calls placed to the pay phone are traced to Tariq Asani, a Lebanese national currently in federal prison. They plan to intercept Asani during a prisoner transport for medical treatment and gain information from him about the sex trafficking operation.

When the car carrying Asani and another prisoner stops en route to its destination, Scott shows up and appears to kill the transport guard, then kills the other prisoner who was on death row. He spares Asani when Asani says he can get them on a plane out of the country that night and confirms the sex slavery ring is based in Dubai.

Scott stops at a convenience store to relay the information to the team. Curtis provides him with more ammunition, but Asani, waiting in the car, happens to spot the badge of another agent talking with Curtis and opens fire. Curtis is wounded and Scott has to kill Asani.

As the team prepares an assault in Dubai, a news broadcast reports that Laura and her college professor were discovered drowned while sailing off the coast of Martha's Vineyard. The rescue operation is called off. Scott returns home, convinced there is no more to be done, but Curtis tracks him down and insists that Laura is alive. He shows Scott an earring that was caught in his sniper's mat from the beach house identical to the earrings Laura is wearing in a news photograph.

When they return to the beach house to investigate, Curtis is killed by a sniper positioned on a nearby boat. Scott evades the sniper and when he finds Laura's unique sign on a window in the beach house indicating she was there, he realizes that she may not be dead. He takes his pager and phone apart and finds a tracking device.

He tries to contact Laura's mother, who is touring a rehab facility, but he is intercepted by a female Secret Service agent assigned to guard the First Family. When he shows the agent the earring, the agent, who knows Laura well, explains that for years the President has used visits to his daughter as a cover for extramarital affairs, and that he pulled Laura's Secret Service detail to use as extra protection for himself during the latest trip, leaving her vulnerable to the members of the sex trafficking ring.

Scott enlists Sergeant Black to help him rescue the girl from Dubai and turns to Avi, a former Israeli operative. Avi agrees to get him into Dubai and smuggle Laura out concealed in a cargo container at the airport, obtaining weapons for him and support from a local man known as Jones.

Jones is killed during the rescue and Scott flees with Laura to a safe house, where he persuades her that although he is alone, he is acting under orders. Correctly guessing that he is really acting on his own, Laura says that King Leonidas of Sparta would respond to requests for help from neighboring kingdoms by sending one man, and decides to trust him.

When he takes Laura to the airport to seal her in the cargo container, Scott discovers he is being tracked when he finds a transmitter hidden in his knife. He rushes her out of the container just as his old team arrives to apprehend them. Scott is shot and Laura is captured. Her captor reveals herself as Sgt. Black, who shows her the earring and photos from the female Secret Service agent, convincing Laura to stop struggling. A Swedish news crew witnesses the struggle as they are about to board their own plane nearby, and recognize Laura. Black is shot, and a hysterical Laura is hustled to safety aboard the journalists' plane. Scott finds the dying Black, who asks if Laura is now safe, which Scott confirms.

Later, on a London city street, a stubbled Scott is shown watching an evening news broadcast regarding Laura's return on a television in a shop window. The government spins the story of Laura's kidnapping as an opportunity for the President to take action to end the trafficking of American girls as sex slaves. A British man watching alongside Scott says, "Time to go home," and walks away. Scott watches him leave and says, "Lucky man." Scott is then seen walking off into Piccadilly Circus.

== Cast ==
- Val Kilmer as Master Gunnery Sergeant Robert John Scott, U.S. Marine Corps.
- Derek Luke as Curtis
- Tia Texada as Sergeant Jacqueline Black
- Kristen Bell as First Daughter Laura Newton
- Lionel Mark Smith as Colonel Blane
- Johnny Messner as Sergeant Grace
- Ed O'Neill as Robert Burch
- William H. Macy as Stoddard
- Saïd Taghmaoui as Tariq Asani
- Clark Gregg as Agent Miller
- Natalia Nogulich as Nadya Tellich
- Moshe Ivgy as Avi
- Kick Gurry as Agent Jones
- Geoff Pierson as Agent Pearce
- Vincent Guastaferro as Agent Naylor
- Andy Davoli as Jerry Zimmer
- Aaron Stanford as Michael Blake
- Margot Farley as Young Prostitute

== Production ==
In February 2003, it was announced Val Kilmer would star in Spartan, a David Mamet scripted political thriller which Mamet would also direct.

The Dubai locales were actually filmed in Los Angeles. Eric L. Haney, a retired U.S. Army Command Sergeant Major who operated in Delta Force, was the technical advisor, and briefly appears. After Spartan, he and Mamet created The Unit television series about an Army unit mirroring Delta Force.

Alexandra Kerry, daughter of then-U.S. Senator (later Secretary of State) John Kerry, is a bartender in the film. David Mamet's rabbi, Mordechai Finley, appears as one of the training cadre. Political operative Ed Skyler has praised the film for its realism regarding the inner workings of the Washington elite.

The Scott character says the line, "One riot, one Ranger." Mamet previously used that dialogue in House of Games, and it has subsequently been used in The Unit. The remark is said to be Texas Rangers lore.

The automatic knife used in the film is "The Spartan" by Severtech and was designed for this film.

== Home media ==
Spartan was released on video and DVD June 15, 2004.

== Reception ==
The review-aggregation website Rotten Tomatoes gives the film a score of 65% based on reviews from 134 critics, and a weighted average of 6.5 out of 10. The website's critical consensus states, "A good cast and Mamet's mastery over the written language elevate an otherwise conventional thriller." At Metacritic, another review aggregator, the film received a weighted average score of 60% based on 34 reviews, indicating "mixed or average reviews".

Roger Ebert in the Chicago Sun-Times gave the film a four-star rating saying that "The particular pleasure of 'Spartan' is to watch the characters gradually define themselves and the plot gradually emerge like your face in a steamy mirror."

Ross Douthat wrote "Here's my rule of thumb: Anytime a critic praises a director for pushing any movie—let alone a low-budget thriller—'into the abstract,' you know you've entered the realm of the lousy-but-pretentious, which is not a particularly fun place to spend a Saturday night. I promise you, folks, Spartan is bad—both in the way that only David Mamet can be bad and in a heap of others. The only thing that raises it to the level of 'interesting pop culture artifact' is the sheer strangeness of its central conceit, which is almost bizarre enough to merit the price of the Blockbuster rental. I won't spoil it—but suffice to say, David Mamet thinks Jenna and Barbara should be keeping a weather eye on their Dad."

Tim Robey in The Daily Telegraph felt the film was let down by a "botched" finale, "as though Mamet felt obliged to reproduce a standard-issue Tom Clancy climax while knowing that this wasn't the way to go."
