= Red Heat (1985 film) =

- Directed by: Robert Collector
- Written by: Robert Collector; Gary Drucker
- Produced by: Ernst R. von Theumer
- Starring: Linda Blair; Sylvia Kristel
- Music by: Tangerine Dream
- Release date: May 28, 1985
- Running time: 104 minutes
- Language: English
- Box office: 37,933 admissions (France)

Red Heat is a 1985 women in prison film starring Linda Blair and Sylvia Kristel.

== Plot summary ==
Christine Carlson, an American college student, travels to West Germany to visit her fiancé Mike, a US Army soldier. She tries to convince him to marry her promptly, but he chooses to delay marriage in order to re-enlist. Distraught by Mike's decision, Christine takes a late-night walk where she witnesses a kidnapping by the East German Stasi and gets kidnapped herself as well. She is transported to East Germany, where she is brutally interrogated by the Stasi, forced to admit to false charges of espionage, and thrown into a women's prison. The mostly vicious "common criminals" are dominated by the gang leader Sofia, who is the prisoners' "top bitch" and has de facto control of the entire prison population, whom she often tortures and rapes alongside her top lackeys. Sofia takes pleasure in brutally tormenting and harassing Christine until the latter loses her patience and fights Sofia in a no-holds-barred brawl. Meanwhile, Mike is determined to free his beloved, and tries to get the US Army and the West German BND to help him. While they officially refuse, they covertly give him intel and connect him to a network of East German fighters who join forces with him on a mission to infiltrate the prison and rescue Christine.

== Cast ==
- Linda Blair as Christine Carlson
- Sylvia Kristel as Sofia
- Sue Kiel as Hedda
- William Ostrander as Mike
- Elisabeth Volkmann as Einbeck
- Albert Fortell as Ernst
- Herb Andress as Werner
- Barbara Spitz as Meg
- Kati Marothy as Barbara
- Dagmar Schwarz as Lillian
- Sissy Weiner as Uta
- Norbert Blecha as Kurt
- Sonja Martin as Evelyn
- Evelyn Engleder as Eva
- John Brett as Roger
- Michael Troy as Howard
- Helmut Janatsch as Lecture
- Elvira Neustädtl as Limmer
- Fritz von Friedl as BND Agent
