= Extreme Ops =

- Theatrical release poster
- Directed by: Christian Duguay
- Written by: Michael Zaidan; Timothy Scott Bogart; Mark Mullin
- Produced by: Moshe Diamant; Jan Fantl
- Starring: Devon Sawa; Bridgette Wilson-Sampras; Rupert Graves; Rufus Sewell; Heino Ferch; Klaus Löwitsch
- Cinematography: Hannes Hubach
- Edited by: Clive Barrett; Sylvain Lebel
- Music by: Normand Corbeil; Stanislas Syrewicz
- Distributed by: Paramount Pictures; MDP Worldwide
- Release date: 27 November 2002
- Running time: 93 minutes
- Countries: United Kingdom; Luxembourg; Germany
- Language: English
- Budget: $40 million
- Box office: $10 million

Extreme Ops is a 2002 action thriller film directed by Christian Duguay and written by Michael Zaidan, Timothy Scott Bogart, and Mark Mullin. It stars Devon Sawa, Bridgette Wilson-Sampras, Rupert Graves, and Rufus Sewell. The film's plot revolves around a television commercial director and three extreme sports enthusiasts, who embark on their trip to the Alps for seasonal practice and stunt filming. They unknowingly film at the same location that serves as a hideout for Serbia's most wanted war criminal, and subsequently employ their fast-paced extreme sports abilities to escape the treacherous mountain and save their lives.

Extreme Ops was released on November 27, 2002. Upon release, the film was a commercial failure, grossing $10.9 million against a $40 million production budget, and was panned by critics. It was the final wide release film of Sawa, who would later shift to direct-to-video titles for seventeen years until 2019.

== Plot ==
A group of individuals embarks on a trip to the Austrian Alps for seasonal practice and stunt filming. The team consists of commercial director Ian, Hollywood producer Will, extreme sports enthusiasts Chloe, Kittie, and Silo, cinematographer Mark, and Ian's boss, Jeffery. They are accompanied by Zoran, their helicopter pilot, who flies them to a resort under construction.

During their first night at the resort, Will and Silo witness a man and a woman entering a room. Curiosity piqued, they secretly videotape the beginning of their affair, unaware that the man is Slobodan Pavlov, Serbia's most wanted war criminal, believed to be dead. The woman, Yana, is Pavlov's love interest and someone Jeffery had encountered on the train earlier. As it turns out, the resort is actually Pavlov's hideout, and he is accompanied by his henchmen, including his son Slavko.

The group continues their filming the next day, capturing controlled avalanches. At night, while playing truth or dare in a hot tub, they are unknowingly observed by Slavko. Mistaking them for CIA agents due to the videotape, Slavko reports this to his father, leading to a decision to kill them. On the third day, Jeffery is kidnapped by Slavko and his henchman Ivo and brought before Pavlov. Slavko and Ivo hijack Zoran's helicopter, while the rest of the group is held at gunpoint. However, a confrontation between Slavko and Ivo leads to both of them accidentally shooting each other.

After narrowly escaping an avalanche, the group realizes the danger they are in after videotaping Pavlov. They try to escape but encounter more of Pavlov's henchmen. Despite subduing one of them, Ratko, they are unable to flee in a cable car as Pavlov takes control of it. They manage to escape on skis while under fire from Pavlov and his henchmen.

They reach a steep cliff and decide to tether down to a gap for their escape. Will parachutes to safety, but Silo is shot in the abdomen. Kittie tends to his wounds while armed with a rocket launcher. The group splits up, with Ian, Chloe, and Mark attempting to escape. At the hideout, Yana betrays Pavlov and conspires with Jeffery to escape together.

Will, who had been hiding on a tree, frees himself and escapes. The next day, Pavlov and his henchmen resume their pursuit. Mark sets a trap while Ian and Chloe escape through another gap. Kittie tries to fire the rocket at the helicopter but misses, narrowly avoiding hitting Jeffery and Yana in a cable car. Mark manages to disable the helicopter by jamming the tail rotors with a cable, causing it to crash.

As an avalanche is triggered, Ian and Chloe ski for their lives, successfully capturing it on video for the commercial. They take cover behind a rock, narrowly escaping the snowslide. Back in the States, the commercial is positively received, and it is scheduled for television broadcast.

The film concludes with a phone call from Kittie to Ian, prompting him to look out the window. To his surprise, he sees Will, Chloe, Kittie, and Silo on top of a train, performing stunts just like they did at the beginning of the film. The four enthusiasts release their skateboards, which fly through the commercial's billboard, with one of them passing through Chloe's mouth. Ian smiles and remarks, "There we go again."

== Cast ==
- Devon Sawa as Will
- Bridgette Wilson-Sampras as Chloe
- Rupert Graves as Jeffrey
- Rufus Sewell as Ian
- Heino Ferch as Mark
- Joe Absolom as Silo
- Jana Pallaske as Kittie
- Klaus Löwitsch as Slobodan Pavlov
- Jean-Pierre Castaldi as Zoran
- Liliana Komorowska as Yana
- David Scheller as Slavko Pavlov
- Detlef Bothe as Ratko
- Heinrich Schmieder as Goran
- Franjo Marincic as Ivo
- Rade Radovic as Jakša
- Wolfgang Packhauser as Nervous Serb
- Norbert Blecha as Foreman
- Vicky Huang as Kana
- Hiro Kanagawa as Mr. Imahara

== Production ==
In May 2000, it was reported that Michael Zaidan, a recent graduate of the American Film Institute, secured a low-six-figure deal to write The Extremists, an action project with Christian Duguay attached to helm and Moshe Diamant to produce.

Budgeted at $40 million, the film was financed via the German film fund ApolloMedia, Canadian tax shelter monies, and foreign presales. Producers were Moshe Diamant's Signature Entertainment and Jan Fantl's Quality International. Mark Damon's MDP Worldwide handled some of the film's presales. It was originally titled The Extremists.

In October 2001, it was reported that Paramount Pictures had acquired distribution rights.

== Critical reception ==
The film was panned by critics. It holds a 7% rating on Rotten Tomatoes based on 68 reviews, with the site's consensus stating: "The various stunts in Extreme Ops can't compensate for the inane storyline and bad dialogue." On Metacritic, it has a score of 17 out of 100 based on reviews from 14 critics, indicating "overwhelming dislike". Audiences polled by CinemaScore gave the film an average grade of "D+" on an A+ to F scale.
