= Jack Newfield =

American journalist

Jack Abraham Newfield
- Born: February 18, 1938; Brooklyn, New York, U.S.
- Died: December 21, 2004 (aged 66); New York City, U.S.
- Education: Hunter College
- Occupations: Journalist, author, documentary filmmaker
- Spouse: Janie Eisenberg (m. 1971)
- Children: 2
- Writing career
- Language: English
- Notable awards: George Polk Award (1979), Emmy Award (1992), American Book Award (2002)

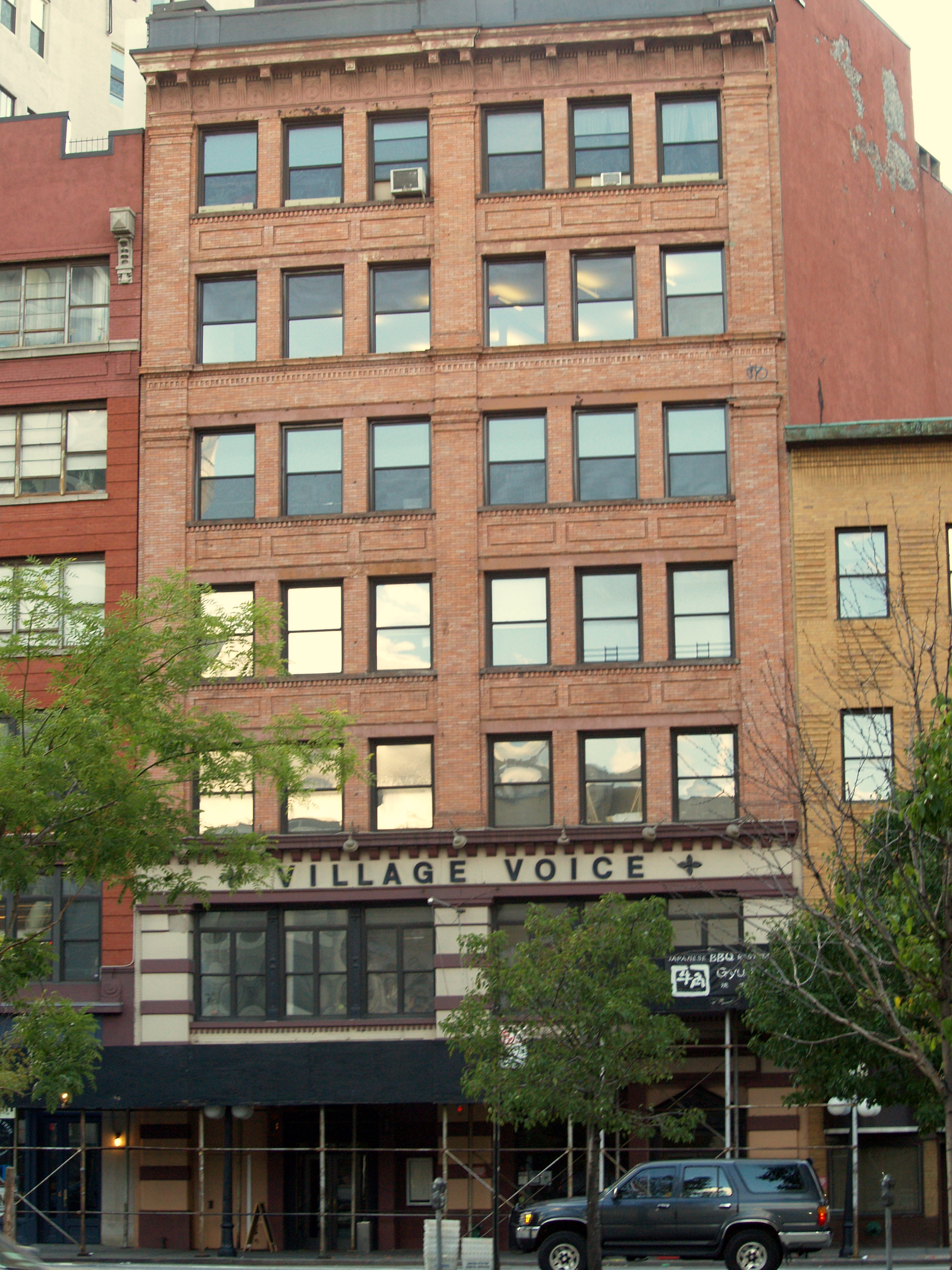
The Cooper Square office of the Village Voice, where Newfield contributed over 700 published articles over his career

Jack Abraham Newfield (February 18, 1938 – December 20, 2004) was an American journalist, columnist, author, documentary filmmaker and activist. Newfield wrote for the Village Voice, New York Daily News, New York Post, New York Sun, New York, Parade, Tikkun, Mother Jones, and The Nation and monthly columns for several labor union newspapers. In his autobiography, Somebody's Gotta Tell It: The Upbeat Memoir of a Working-Class Journalist (2002), Newfield said, "The point is not to confuse objectivity with truth."

A career beat reporter, Newfield wrote prolifically about modern society, culture, and politics, on a range of topics relevant to urban life, such as municipal corruption, the police, and labor unions, and also professional sports, especially baseball and boxing, as well as contemporary music. He wrote numerous books about modern social and political subjects, including A Prophetic Minority (1966) and Robert Kennedy: A Memoir (1969). He received the American Book Award for The Full Rudy: The Man, the Myth, the Mania about New York City Mayor Rudy Giuliani.

== Early life and education ==
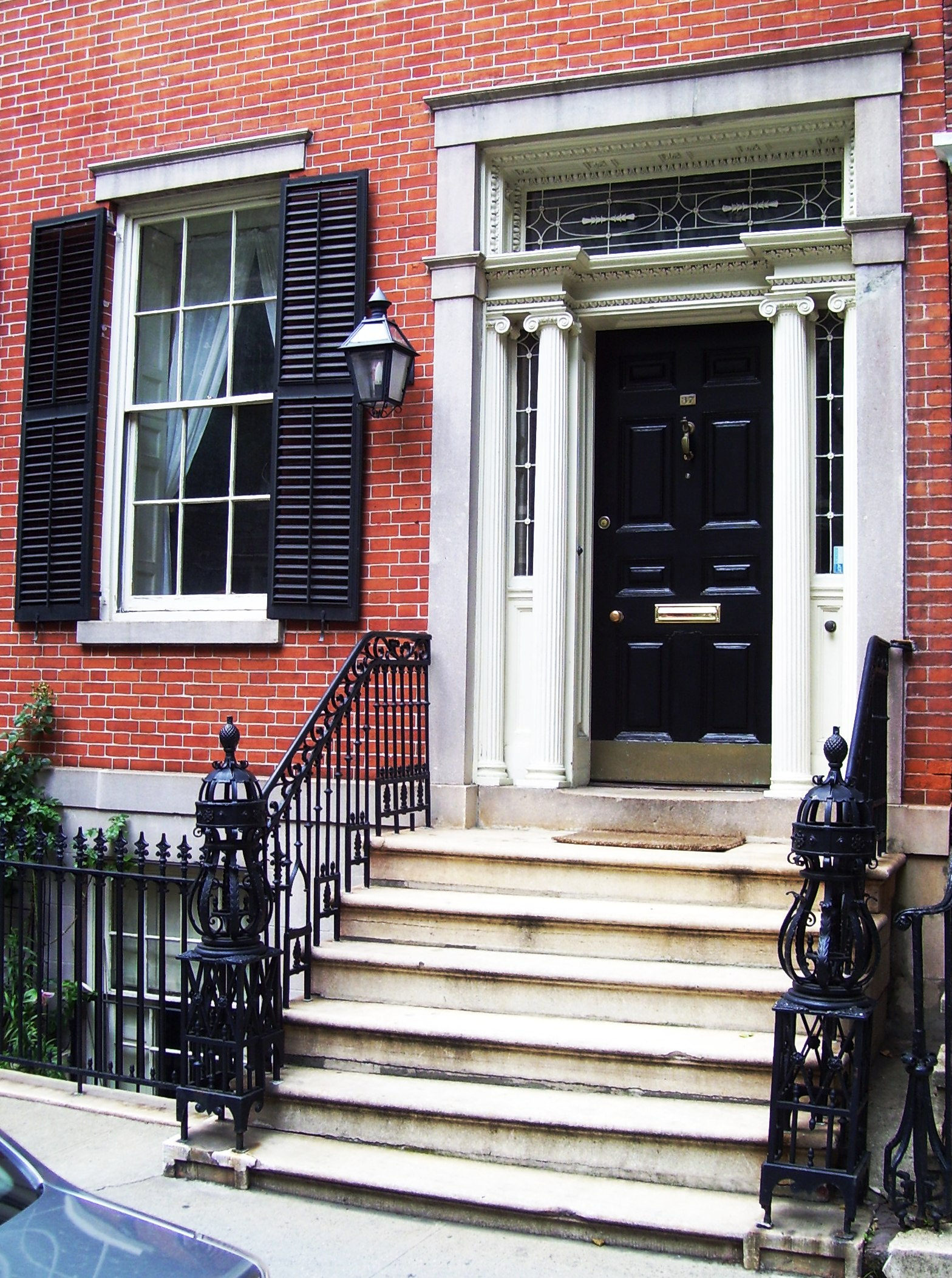
The entrance to 35 Charlton Street in Greenwich Village, where Newfield lived for most of his life

Newfield was born and grew up in the Bedford–Stuyvesant section of Brooklyn, where he was primarily raised by his mother, Ethel (Tuchman) Newfield. When he was four years old, his father, Phillip Newfield, died of a heart attack. An only child, Newfield was a latchkey kid. The ethos of his upbringing led him to establish a professional approach he identified as "advocacy journalism".

Newfield completed his secondary education at Brooklyn's Boys High School before receiving his B.A. in journalism from Hunter College in 1960. While at Hunter, he wrote pamphlets for the Student Nonviolent Coordinating Committee ("SNCC") and articles for the Hunter Arrow student newspaper. During the 1960s, he was drawn to the Civil Rights Movement and the antiwar New Left politics of Students for a Democratic Society (SDS) under the tutelage of Michael Harrington. He was arrested in the South at a sit-in in 1963 and spent two days in a Mississippi jail with Michael Schwerner, who was murdered in that state in June 1964 with James Chaney and Andrew Goodman.

Identifying as a populist, Newfield was from the outset a politically active journalist and author. In 1968, he signed the "Writers and Editors War Tax Protest" pledge, vowing to refuse to pay tax to protest against the Vietnam War, and later became a sponsor of the War Tax Resistance project, which practiced and advocated tax resistance as a form of protest against the war. By 1971, Newfield had begun to question the ideology of the New Left, writing that "in its Weathermen, Panther and Yippee incarnations, [the New Left] seems anti-democratic, terroristic, dogmatic, stoned on rhetoric and badly disconnected from everyday reality".

Newfield served as a copy boy at the New York Daily Mirror and later became editor of the West Side News, a local weekly. He resided on Charlton Street in Greenwich Village for most of his adult life.

== Career ==
=== Journalism ===
Newfield considered himself a "participatory journalist", involved in politics and advocacy. Inspired by Lincoln Steffens, Jacob Riis, and I.F. Stone, Newfield held himself to a professional standard of moral emotionalism. On this he wrote, "Compassion without anger can become merely sentiment or pity. Knowledge without anger can stagnate into mere cynicism and apathy. Anger improves lucidity, persistence, audacity, and memory."

In 1964, he was hired by editor Dan Wolf to write for the Village Voice. Newfield said he set out to "combine activism with writing" and advised like-minded journalists to "create a constituency for reform and don't stop until you have made some progress or positive results." In 1968, Newfield covered the Chicago Democratic Convention, where he famously threw a typewriter from the window of his Chicago hotel at police that he saw beating demonstrators. By 1988, Newfield had contributed 700 articles to the newspaper over 24 years on staff as a reporter, columnist and senior editor. From 1988, Newfield was editor and writer in an investigative reporting unit at the New York Daily News. Ardently pro-labor, he made a principled choice to support a 1990 strike by the newspaper's unionized reporters and refused to cross the picket line, resigning his editorship. Shortly thereafter, he joined the New York Post as a columnist. After conservative publisher Rupert Murdoch resumed ownership of the publication, Newfield wrote columns and investigative articles for The New York Sun, The New York Observer and The Nation.

In 1980, the Center for Investigative Reporting awarded Newfield the George Polk Award for Political Reporting, and he received a New York State Bar Association Special Award in 1986 for his series of articles on wrongfully convicted Bobby McLaughlin. In 2000, he was honored with the 25-Year News Achievement Award from the Society of the Silurians. Since 2006, Hunter College awards the Jack Newfield Professorship each spring to a distinguished journalist representative of his legacy of investigative journalism.

=== Author and filmmaker ===
Newfield authored books about contemporary political and social phenomena. Newfield wrote A Prophetic Minority (1967), his account of the early 1960s civil rights movement, the formation of the SNCC, the voter registration initiative in Mississippi, the expansion of the SNCC to include white students and the rise of SDS. A year later, The New York Times called Newfield's book Robert Kennedy: A Memoir (1969) a "a perceptive and moving book", and it was received again when it was reissued in 2003, on the 35th anniversary of Kennedy's murder. Newfield was traveling with Kennedy and his campaign when the senator from New York was assassinated by Sirhan Sirhan in Los Angeles on in June 1968. He endeavors to separate "the man from the myth" in his first-hand accounted of the assassinated politician. He wrote about Kennedy, "Part of him was soldier, priest, radical, and football coach. But he was none of these. He was a politician; His enemies said he was consumed with selfish ambition, a ruthless opportunist exploiting his brother's legend. But he was too passionate and too vulnerable ever to be the cool and confident operator his brother was."

Newfield and Jeff Greenfield co-authored A Populist Manifesto: The Making Of A New Minority (1972), an elaboration on their ideas about civic reform, relevant to the banking and insurance industries, utilities, regulatory agencies, land reform, the media, crime, health care, labor unions and foreign policy. With Paul Du Brul, he co-wrote The Abuse of Power: The Permanent Government and the Fall of New York (Viking Press, 1977) and the revised edition, The Permanent Government: Who Really Rules New York? (Pilgrim Press, 1981), considered classics in urban muckraking.

In City for Sale (1988), Newfield and longtime Village Voice collaborator Wayne Barrett chronicled patronage-driven municipal corruption in New York during the three-term mayoralty of Ed Koch. In 2003, Newfield's acerbic critique of the mayoralty of Rudy Giuliani, The Full Rudy: The Man, the Myth, the Mania (2002), received the American Book Award. City of Rich and Poor: Jack Newfield on New York, a 2003 PBS documentary, was based on "How the Other Half Still Lives", a contemporaneous Newfield article published in The Nation. In 1988, Robert Kennedy: A Memoir was adapted into an acclaimed documentary, which Newfield wrote and co-directed. He was writer and reporter of JFK, Hoffa and the Mob, a 1992 PBS documentary.

Newfield advocated for professional boxers to be viewed as members of the "exploited working class". He wrote and produced documentaries about professional boxing, including Fallen Champ: The Untold Story of Mike Tyson (1993), Sugar Ray Robinson: Bright Lights, Dark Shadows, (HBO, 1998; co-producer), The Making of Bamboozled (2001) and Ring of Fire: The Emile Griffith Story (2005). In 1991, he was a contributing reporter and writer to the documentary Don King Unauthorized (Frontline & Stuart Television, 1991), which aired on PBS. Shortly thereafter, he authored Only in America The Life and Crimes of Don King in 1995, a story serialized in Penthouse and then adapted it into a 1997 Emmy Award-winning HBO biopic, Don King: Only in America, directed by John Herzfeld, starring Ving Rhames.

=== Activism ===
Newfield was an investigative reporter who wrote openly about social reform. His articles often influenced the media and public policy. Notable examples include the creation of a law banning the use of lead paint in apartments, changes in campaign finance laws, the prosecution of corruption and enforcement of regulations to protect the elderly in nursing homes. His series of articles on wrongly convicted and imprisoned Brooklyn resident Bobby McLoughlin helped to exonerate and release him from prison in 1986.

Historians of the political movement against lead poisoning in the U.S. trace its origins to the American civil rights and environmental movements, and acknowledge Newfield's series of newspaper articles in New York City about the tragic consequences of lead poisoning, beginning in 1969, for exposing the lead scandal, and then-Mayor John Lindsay's initiation of the first lead poison prevention program, a model for other urban areas.

From 1999 to 2004, Newfield wrote a series of columns advocating for the idea of a memorial honoring Jackie Robinson (1919–1972), legendary for his role as the first black professional baseball player in the major leagues, and Brooklyn Dodgers baseball team captain Pee Wee Reese, who together made history. In 2005, a commemorative sculpture by William Behrends was installed at the center of a circular lawn and perimeter walkway designed by Ken Smith, inscribed with commentary related to the lives and achievements of the athletes, in front of a Brooklyn ball field, Key Span Park.

Still working until the end of his life, Jack Newfield died in New York City, succumbing to kidney cancer on December 21, 2004, at the age of 66.

=== Awards and recognition ===
Newfield received the American journalism George Polk Award in 1979 for reporting on politics at the Village Voice.

=== Books ===
- Newfield, J., (1966). A Prophetic Minority. New York: New American Library.
- Newfield, J. (1969). Robert Kennedy: A Memoir. New York: E.P. Dutton & Co.
- Newfield, J. (1971). Bread and Roses Too: Reporting About America. New York: E.P. Dutton & Co.
- Newfield, J. (1974). Cruel and Unusual Justice: From Incompetence to Corruption, The Failure of Our Courts and Prisons. New York: Holt, Rinehart and Winston.
- Newfield, J. (1984). The Education of Jack Newfield. New York: St. Martin's Press.
- Newfield, J. (1995) Only in America: The life and Crimes of Don King. New York: William Morrow.
- Newfield, J. (2002). The Full Rudy: The Man, the Myth, the Mania. New York: Thunder's Mouth Press/Nation Books.
- Newfield, J. (2002). Somebody's Gotta Tell It: The Upbeat Memoir of a Working-Class Journalist. New York: Saint Martin's Press.
- Newfield, J. (ed.) (2003). American Rebels. New York: Thunder's Mouth Press/Nation Books.

=== Co-authored books ===
- Newfield, J., & Grossman, R. (1966). Animal Ranch: The Great American Fable. New York: Parallax Pub. Co.
- Newfield, J., & Greenfield, J. (1972). A Populist Manifesto: The Making of a New Majority. New York: Praeger.
- Newfield, J., & DuBrul, P. (1977).The Abuse of Power: The Permanent Government and the Fall of New York. New York: Pilgrim Press.
- Newfield, J., & DuBrul, P., (1981) The Permanent Government: Who Really Rules New York? The Pilgrim Press.
- Newfield, J., & Barrett, W. (1988). City for Sale: Ed Koch and the Betrayal of New York. New York: Harper & Row.
- Newfield, J., & Jacobson, M. (2004). American Monsters: 44 Rats, Blackhats, and Plutocrats. New York: Thunder's Mouth Press.

=== Reporting, selected ===
- "More Bad Judges". The Nation, January 8, 2004. 278, 3, 7.
- The Meaning of Muhammad". The Nation, January 17, 2002. '274, 4, 25.
- "B.B. King: Legend, Icon, American Original ... I Put Everything In The Song". The Philadelphia Inquirer, September 28, 2003.
- "Plenty of Nothing in New York: Governor Pataki's effective Gary Cooper imitation leaves Democrats in despair". The Nation, October 24, 2002, 275, 16, 18.
- "The Shame of Boxing: The fighters are powerless workers in need of rights and justice". The Nation, November 12, 2001, 273, 15, 13.
- "Can Mark Green Heal NYC?: New York's Democratic mayoral primary revealed the city's racial fault lines". The Nation, October 18, 2001, 273, 14, 20.
- "An Interview with Michael Moore". Tikkun, November - December, 1998. 13.6: 25–29.
- "Remembering John F. Kennedy Jr." TV Guide, July 3 to August 6, 1999.
- "Stallone vs. Springsteen". Playboy, April 1986, p. 116-117+188-191.
- "Of Honest Men & Good Writers". The Village Voice, 1972, Vol. XVII, No. 20
- "Congressman Ed Koch is misleading the readers of The Voice". The Village Voice, 13, 1972, Vol. XVII, No. 2
- "The Death of Liberalism". Playboy, April 1971.
- "Blowin' in the Wind: A Folk-Music Revolt". The Village Voice, January 14, 1965, Vol. X, No. 13
- "MacDougal at Midnight: A Street Under Pressure". The Village Voice, April 8, 1965, Vol. X, No. 25
- "The Liberals' Big Stick: Ready for the SNCC??" Cavalier, June 1965, 33.
- "Jack Newfield and Robert Kennedy: A Lunch that Launched a Memoir". The Village Voice, 1969, Vol. XIV, No. 34.
- "Campus Across The River: Cause Without A Rebel". The Village Voice, May 20, 1965, Vol. X, No. 31
- "Bobby Kennedy In The Village". The Village Voice, October 8, 1964, Vol. IX, No. 51

=== Contributory works ===
- Newfield, J. (1990) "Introduction" in Gunter Temech, Photographer. The Lost Supper/The Last Generation, Gegenschein Press.

== See also ==
- List of people from Brooklyn, New York
