= The Unfish =

1997 film

- Directed by: Robert Dornhelm
- Written by: Michael Köhlmeier
- Starring: Maria Schrader
- Release date: 19 February 1997 (Berlin)
- Running time: 90 minutes
- Country: Austria
- Language: German

The Unfish (German: Der Unfisch) is a 1997 Austrian comedy film directed by Robert Dornhelm. The film was selected as the Austrian entry for the Best Foreign Language Film at the 70th Academy Awards, but was not accepted as a nominee.

== Cast ==
- Maria Schrader as Sophie Moor
- Eva Herzig as Maria Johler
- Andreas Lust as Carl
- Georges Kern as Herr Landauer
- August Schmölzer as Bürgermeister
- Karl Merkatz as Herr Johler
- Bibiane Zeller as Frau Johler
- Rudolf Wessely as Pfarrer

== See also ==
- List of submissions to the 70th Academy Awards for Best Foreign Language Film
- List of Austrian submissions for the Academy Award for Best Foreign Language Film
