= Robert Dornhelm =

Austrian film and television director

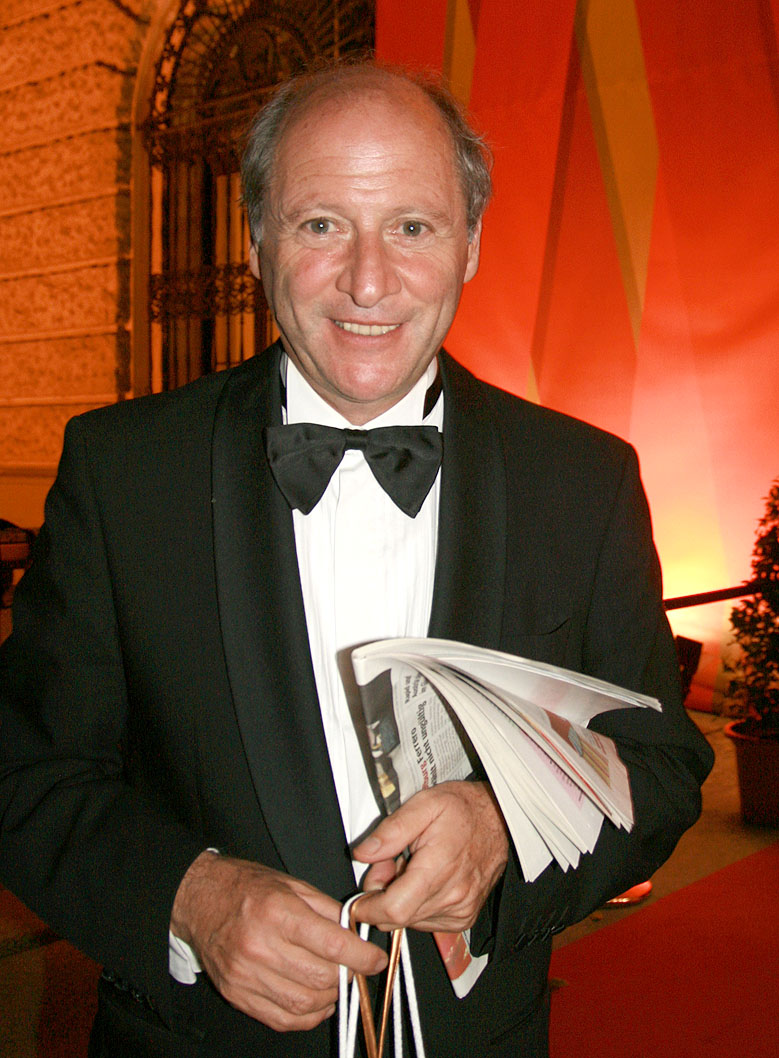
- Born: December 17, 1947 (age 78); Timișoara, Romania
- Occupations: Film and television director

Robert Dornhelm (born 17 December 1947) is an Austrian film and television director.

== Biography ==
Born in Timișoara, Banat region, Romania, Dornhelm is of Hungarian-Jewish descent. He has worked on numerous television programmes and has also released such movies as Echo Park, The Venice Project, The Unfish, and A Further Gesture. In 1998 The Unfish won the Citizen's Choice Award at the Puchon International Fantastic Film Festival.

He directed the 1977 documentary film The Children of Theatre Street, which was nominated for an Academy Award.

Dornhelm directed the television miniseries Anne Frank: The Whole Story (2001), for which he was nominated for an Emmy Award. He also directed the new TV adaptation Spartacus (2004) and the 2011 film The Amanda Knox Story.

== Decorations and awards ==
- 1978: Nominations for Academy Award for Best Documentary for The Children of Theatre Street
- 2007: Romy Award for Best Director for Kronprinz Rudolfs letzte Liebe (The Crown Prince)
- 2006: Austrian Cross of Honour for Science and Art

== Selected filmography ==
- The Children of Theatre Street (1977)
- She Dances Alone (1981)
- Echo Park (1986)
- Cold Feet (1989)
- Requiem for Dominic (1990)
- Fatal Deception: Mrs. Lee Harvey Oswald (1993, TV film)
- The Unfish (1997)
- A Further Gesture (1997)
- The Venice Project (1999)
- Anne Frank: The Whole Story (2001, TV miniseries)
- Sins of the Father (2002, TV film)
- RFK (2002, TV film)
- Rudy: The Rudy Giuliani Story (2003, TV film)
- Spartacus (2004, TV film) by novel of Howard Fast
- Suburban Madness (2004, TV film)
- Identity Theft: The Michelle Brown Story (2004, TV film)
- The Ten Commandments (2006, TV film)
- The Crown Prince (2006, TV miniseries)
- War and Peace (2007, TV miniseries) by novel of Leo Tolstoy
- La Bohème (2008)
- Udo Proksch: Out of Control (2010)
- Amanda Knox: Murder on Trial in Italy (2011, TV film)
- Shadows from the Past (2011, TV film)
- K2 - La montagna degli italiani (2012, TV miniseries)
- Das Sacher (2016, TV film)
- Maria Theresa (2017, miniseries)
- Vienna Blood, (2019–2022, TV series)
- Rise of the Raven, (2025, TV series)
