= Wayne Barrett =

American journalist (1945–2017)

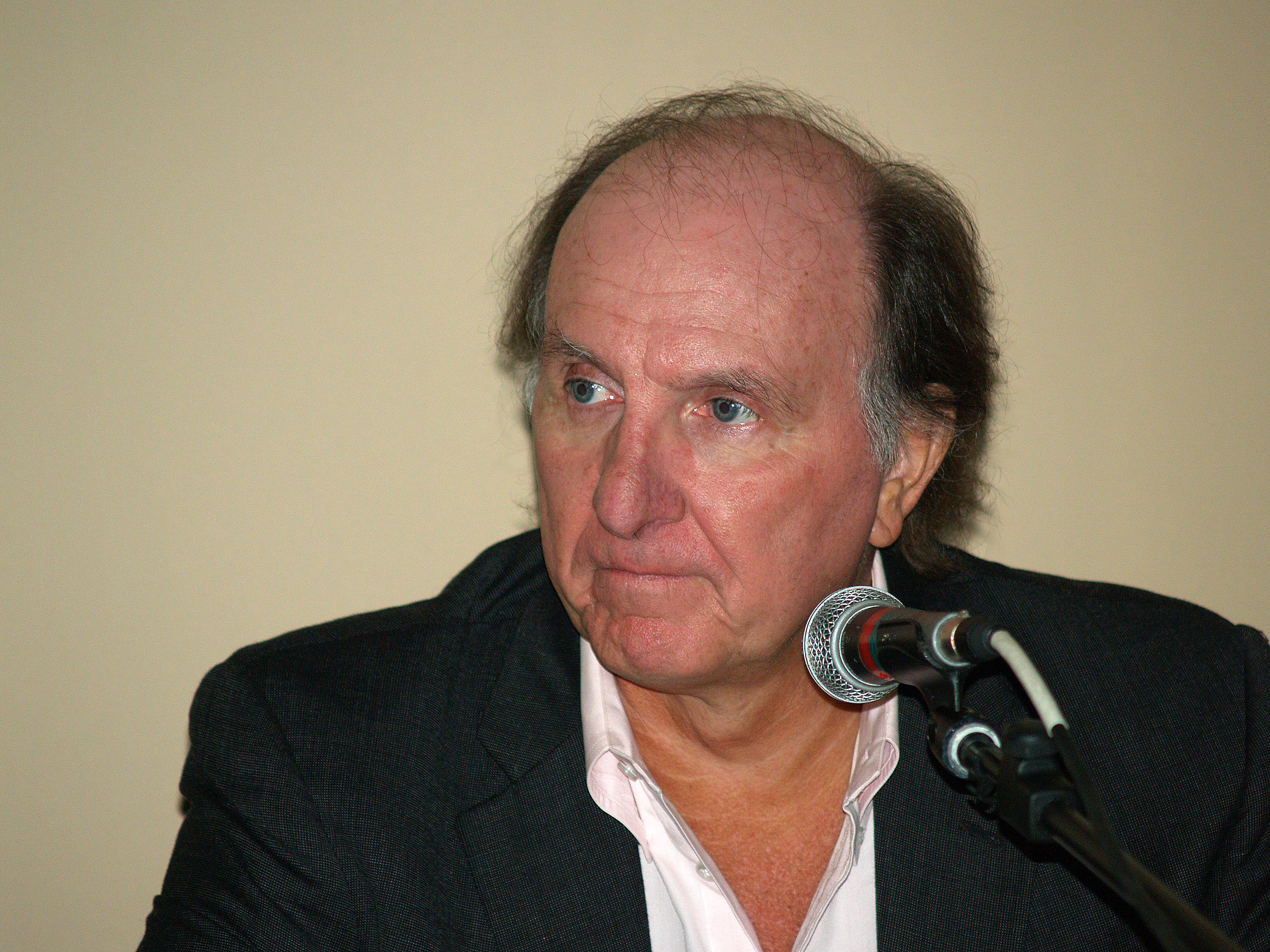
- Barrett in 2007
- Born: July 11, 1945; New Britain, Connecticut, U.S.
- Died: January 19, 2017 (aged 71); Manhattan, New York, U.S.
- Education: Saint Joseph's University (BA); Columbia University (MS)
- Occupation: Journalist
- Spouse: Frances Marie McGettigan (m. 1969)
- Children: 1
- Writing career
- Language: English

Wayne Barrett (July 11, 1945 – January 19, 2017) was an American journalist. He worked as an investigative reporter and senior editor for The Village Voice for 37 years from 1973 on, and was known as a leading investigative journalist focused on power and politics in the United States. He is known as New York City's "foremost muckraker."

“Our credo must be the exposure of the plunderers, the steerers, the wirepullers, the bosses, the brokers, the campaign givers and takers,” Barrett once said to journalism students at his alma mater, Columbia University. “So I say: Stew, percolate, pester, track, burrow, besiege, confront, damage, level, care.”

== Early life and education ==
Barrett was born on July 11, 1945, in New Britain, Connecticut, and was raised in Lynchburg, Virginia. He earned a Bachelor of Arts degree in journalism from Saint Joseph's University and a Master of Science in the discipline from the Columbia University Graduate School of Journalism, where he subsequently taught as an adjunct professor for over thirty years.

== Career ==
Barrett worked at The Village Voice for nearly 40 years. Following his tenure there, he was a fellow at The Nation Institute and a contributor to Newsweek. He was also a professor at Columbia University Graduate School of Journalism.

Barrett was best known for authoring many articles and books about politicians, including New York City figures such as Donald Trump, Rudy Giuliani, and Ed Koch. Barrett was the first journalist to uncover Trump's business deceptions. He began reporting on Trump in the late 1970s and did 10 hours of taped interviews with Trump while the Grand Hyatt New York was under construction; his two-part series led to the impaneling of a federal grand jury in the Eastern District in Brooklyn against Trump. Barrett's 1991 biography of Trump was republished with the title of Trump: The Greatest Show on Earth: The Deals, the Downfall, the Reinvention in 2016.

Barrett's book, Rudy!: An Investigative Biography of Rudolph Giuliani, was adapted into a 2003 television film, Rudy: The Rudy Giuliani Story. He was interviewed for the 2006 documentary Giuliani Time and the 2017 documentary Get Me Roger Stone.

Barrett was a mentor to progressive activist and political commentator Nomiki Konst.

After Barrett's death, his family donated his papers, mainly consisting of research notes related to his investigative reporting, to the Dolph Briscoe Center for American History at the University of Texas at Austin.

== Death ==
Barrett died in Manhattan on January 19, 2017, from complications of interstitial lung disease and lung cancer. Coincidentally, Barrett died the day before Trump was inaugurated as president. Barrett's writings on Trump continued to be relevant during the Trump presidency and were a valuable resource for journalists during that time.

== Selected bibliography ==
- The Big Apple: City for Sale: Ed Koch and the Betrayal of New York (Harper and Row, 1988, ISBN 0-06-091662-1) (with Jack Newfield)
- Trump: The Deals and the Downfall (HarperCollins, 1992, ISBN 0-06-016704-1)
- Rudy!: An Investigative Biography of Rudolph Giuliani (Basic Books, 2001, ISBN 0-465-00524-1)
- Grand Illusion: The Untold Story of Rudy Giuliani and 9/11 (HarperCollins, 2006, ISBN 0-06-053660-8) (with Dan Collins)
- Trump: The Greatest Show on Earth: The Deals, the Downfall, the Reinvention (Regan Arts [e-book] April 26, 2016, ASIN: B01ECUXPIM; Paperback Edition August 2016, ISBN 978-1-68245-079-6)
- Without Compromise: The Brave Journalism that First Exposed Donald Trump, Rudy Giuliani, and the American Epidemic of Corruption (Hachette, 2020, ISBN 978-1-64503-653-1) (edited by Eileen Markey)
