= Jan Fantl =

German film producer

Jan Fantl (born 11 June 1954 in Prague) is a German film producer.

== Biography ==
Jan Fantl is a son of director Thomas Fantl. After Thomas Fantl was barred from working in 1957, he moved with his family to Germany, where he was raised.

Jan Fantl passed his Abitur in Frankfurt am Main in 1975 and started working as a unit production manager at Bavaria Film; he became first assistant director and assistant editor two years later. During this period, Fantl mainly worked with Hajo Gies, producing films and episodes of Tatort. He finished this period as a Second Unit Director on Schimanski's first theatrical debut, On the Killer's Track. Meanwhile, he was hired to assist Wolfgang Petersen (Planübung), Franz Peter Wirth (Wallenstein), and Peter Adam (Tatort).

From 1984 to 1987, he worked as a writer and director for the German Sesame Street. From 1981 until 1988, he worked as producer, writer and director for advertising and corporate promotionals. Beginning 1991, he worked as a line producer on the Icelandic movie Tár úr steini, which was considered for the Academy Award for Best Foreign Language Film in 1996. For the TV pilot Der Clown, he was in charge as Executive Producer in 1996. The same year he founded his own company Q & Q - Qualität und Quoten and produced for his first MoW Ms. Diamond (Die Diebin) which sold to many countries outside German speaking territories. The company was melted later into QI - Quality Int'l - the group of companies responsible for most of his work later on.

Since 1997, Fantl has worked as a producer and entrepreneur who specializes in realizing Hollywood movies in Europe, e.g. eXtreme Ops, and the musical-drama Beyond the Sea, starring Kevin Spacey, Kate Bosworth, John Goodman and Bob Hoskins. The story mainly takes place in the United States, but the movie was shot almost entirely in Germany at Filmstudios Babelsberg and in Berlin. Fantl also co-produced The Musketeer and A Sound of Thunder, Tristan + Isolde, No Good Deed and Spartan. Since 2008, he lived and worked from Prague and 2011 in London; meanwhile he centers his life and work around Berlin and Prague since 2013.

== Filmography ==
- Martial Arts X-treme (2006, TV series) (producer)
- Tristan + Isolde (dir. Kevin Reynolds, 2006) (co-producer)
- A Sound of Thunder (dir. Peter Hyams, 2005) (co-producer)
- Slipstream (2005) (co-executive producer)
- Riding the Bullet (2004) (executive producer)
- Funky Monkey (2004) (co-producer)
- Beyond the Sea (2004) (producer)
- Imaginary Heroes (2004) (executive producer)
- Spartan (2004) (co-producer)
- The Red Phone: Checkmate (2003, TV) (producer)
- Stander (2003) (executive producer)
- Extreme Ops (2002) (producer)
- Deathwatch (2002) (co-executive producer)
- Chromiumblue.com (2002, 13 episodes) (producer)
- FeardotCom (2002) (co-producer)
- No Good Deed (2002) (executive producer)
- The Musketeer (2001) (co-producer)
- Bride of the Wind (2001) (co-producer)
- My First Mister (2001) (co-producer)
- The Red Phone: Manhunt (2001, TV) (producer)
- Investigating Sex (2001) (co-executive producer)
- Diggity: A Home at Last (2001) (co-producer)
- Nicht heulen, Husky (2000, TV) (co-executive producer)
- 20.13 - Mord im Blitzlicht (2000, TV) (co-executive producer)
- Elze Is Gilijos (2000) (producer)
- The Mumbo Jumbo (2000) (co-producer)
- Ms. Diamond (aka Die Diebin, 1998, TV) (producer)
- Der Clown (1996, TV) (executive producer)
- Tár úr steini (aka Tears of Stone, 1995) (line producer)
- Mesmer (1994) (line producer)
