= Curtis Bush =

American boxer (born 1962)

- Born: June 27, 1962 (age 64); Virginia Beach, Virginia, United States
- Other names: The Explosive Thin Man
- Height: 1.83 m (6 ft 0 in)
- Weight: 69 kg (152 lb; 10.9 st)
- Division: Welterweight; Super-welterweight; Light-middleweight; Middleweight
- Reach: 72.0 in (183 cm)
- Style: Kickboxing; boxing
- Fighting out of: Virginia Beach, Virginia, United States
- Team: NIMA Karate (1981-1988); Karate International (1988-1995); Bush Karate Club (1995-2003)
- Trainer: David Miller; George Kelly; Tony Ornelas
- Rank: 3rd degree black belt in Tang Soo Do
- Years active: 1979–1999

Professional boxing record
- Total: 19
- Wins: 12
- By knockout: 10
- Losses: 5
- By knockout: 3
- Draws: 2

Kickboxing record
- Total: 56
- Wins: 42
- By knockout: 30
- Losses: 10
- Draws: 2
- No contests: 2

Amateur record
- Total: 16
- Wins: 14
- By knockout: 10
- Losses: 2
- Draws: 0

Curtis Bush (born June 27, 1962) is an American world champion kickboxer who competed in the welterweight, super-welterweight, light-middleweight and middleweight divisions. A tall Southpaw possessing dangerous spinning back kicks and spinning back fists, Bush competed entirely under full contact rules and was a two-time Virginia state champion as an amateur before turning professional in 1983. After knocking out Robert Visitacion to become the North American welterweight champion in 1987, he went on to win five world titles in four weight classes and retired from competition in 1999.

== Early life ==
Curtis Bush was born in Virginia Beach, Virginia, and in 1976, at the age of 13, began practicing tang soo do, earning his black belt after five years. He took up kickboxing at seventeen.

== Career ==
Bush with cornermen Robert Dickason and George Kelly

Bush began competing as an amateur kickboxer in 1979 and amassed a record of 14–2 with 10 knockouts over the next four years before turning professional in 1983. The highlights of his amateur career include decision wins over Darnell Studavent for the Virginia Welterweight (-67 kg/147 lb) title and Alphonzo Claiborne for the Virginia Super Welterweight (-70 kg/154 lb) belt in 1981 and 1982, respectively.

His professional kickboxing debut came in 1983, in Cleaveland, OH when he won a five-round decision over Roberto "The Bear" Alvarado. He soon became the #9 ranked light welterweight by the PKA when he knocked out the PKA #5 world contender Ken Comer with a fifth round roundhouse kick to the head in Gatineau, Quebec, Canada.

His professional boxing debut came on February 16, 1984. Bush knocked out Charles Carter in the second round in Virginia Beach, VA. He was picked by Muhammad Ali in 1984 to box on his Champion Sports Pro Boxing Team in the Cayman Islands. Ali had watched Bush in a kickboxing match on ESPN in which he had knocked out George Morrisey with head kick in the sixth round. Bush won his boxing fight by a fourth-round knockout, which gave him a record of 3–0 with 3 KOs as a professional boxer. Bush signed a six-fight contract with Ali's lawyer, Richard Hirschfeld, to box in the Caribbean with a final bout in London, England, for a minor title. However, the company folded soon after Bush's Cayman Islands fight because of stock fraud. In 2005, captured fugitive Richard Hirschfeld committed suicide.

In 1985, Bush fought four-time PKA world champion Cliff "Magic" Thomas in a non-title bout in Atlanta, Georgia and won the fight by unanimous decision over five rounds. The bout was televised on ESPN, and the win moved Bush to #4 in the PKA rankings. A month later, Bush knocked out Canadian welterweight champion Raynald Lamarre in Montreal, Quebec, Canada. Those two wins pushed Bush to #2 in the ISKA world ratings after the demise of the PKA. Bush fought #1 ISKA world contender Richard "Gator" in October 1986 for the vacant ISKA World welterweight championship. Bush had previously KO'd Hill in 1982 in Gainesville, FL in the first round of an ESPN televised bout. Richard Hill stopped Bush in the 9th round by TKO and became the first ISKA world welterweight champion. Bush became the ISKA #1 world welterweight contender after knocking out then current #1 contender Paul Biafore in Toronto, Ontario, Canada in 1987. Bush won with fifth-round knockout. That same year, he won the ISKA North American Welterweight (-66.8 kg/147.3 lb) Full Contact Championship over Robert Visitacion in Stateline, Nevada. He dominated his opponent throughout, scoring two early knockdowns before finishing him off with a liver punch in round two.

Two years later, in 1989, he won the FFKA United States light welterweight (-67 kg/147 lb) belt in Portland, Maine against Chuck Cypress. After forcing three standing eight counts on Cypress in rounds two and three, he continued to batter his opponent in the fourth and caused his corner to throw in the towel. Having outgrown the domestic circuit, Bush won his first world championship in 1990 against #3 ISKA world title contender Emmanuel Essissima in Paris, France, where he won a twelve-round split decision over the Cameroonian for the full contact ISKA light middleweight (-72.3 kg/159.4 lb) belt.

Bush then became a world champion for the second time in 1990 with a fourth-round KO of #1 WKKO world middleweight contender Bubba "Blackhawk" Walters. Curtis won the WKKO World Middleweight (-73 kg/160 lb) Championship.

1991 saw Bush fight in the kickboxing hotbed of Amsterdam, Netherlands for the first time where he faced local fighter Marlon Boldewijn. He was stunned and given a standing eight count in round three before losing on points. Despite this setback, he was still granted a shot at his third world title and he knocked out Piotr Falender in round seven to take the ISKA's world welterweight title in his home town of Virginia Beach, Virginia. He defended this belt in Ajaccio, Corsica in 1992, Toussaint Andarelli. Bush and Toussaint Andarelli would later rematch but fought to a no contest.

Having boxed occasionally since 1984, Bush won his first title in the sport on February 3, 1994, by defeating Lynn Jackson via technical knockout in round ten in Virginia Beach for the USBA Southern Light Middleweight (-69.9 kg/154 lb) belt. This earned him the spot as the IBF #1 Intercontinental contender. Returning to kickboxing, he became a four time world champion when he won a unanimous twelve-round decision over Tom Montgomery in Brighton, England, to be crowned the ISKA World Super Welterweight (-69.5 kg/153.2 lb) Full Contact Champion, setting up a unification fight with Roberto Fatica at the Dundonald International Ice Bowl in Belfast, Northern Ireland in 1996. With both Bush's ISKA super welterweight title and Fatica's WKA super welterweight (-70 kg/154.3 lb) strap on the line, Bush stopped the Italian in round eight to become the undisputed world champion.

He lost the ISKA super welterweight world title to Mark Weller when he was TKO'd in the eight round in Cambridge, England, in May 1997. He rebounded later in the year by taking the vacant ISKA North American crown in the same division with a controversial majority decision win over Melvin Murray in Toronto, Canada. Bush won his second USBA Boxing title when he won a twelve-round split decision over Kevin Hall 15-2(11 KOs) for the USBA Southern Middleweight Championship on October 2, 1997, in Virginia Beach, Virginia. In his first attempt at the NBA World Middleweight (-72.64 kg/160 lb) boxing title, Bush was TKO'd in round nine by Elvis Alexander in Virginia Beach on April 16, 1998. He also lost a unanimous decision to Tom Kimber at the Mass Destruction pay-per-view in Lowell, Massachusetts in May 1999 in an IKF World Middleweight (-75 kg/165.3 lb) Full Contact title challenge.

Bush retired on June 30, 1999, aged thirty-seven, after being stopped in the ninth round by Elvis Alexander again for the NBA World title.

== Acting ==
Bush appeared with Bill "Superfoot" Wallace in five commercials for the Treco Powerstretch and SABBA in 1985. His first film role was as a deranged poacher in the 1988 Canadian film Dragon Hunt, filmed in Toronto, Ontario, Canada. Bush's character was killed by star Michael McNamara in a fight scene. Bush also had a small role as a member of the Foot gang in the films Teenage Mutant Ninja Turtles and Teenage Mutant Ninja Turtles II: The Secret of the Ooze in 1990 and 1991, respectively. In 1992, he starred in a locally produced UPN television series 464 Roadhouse, which was based on the film Roadhouse starring Patrick Swayze. Bush played Dillon and Swayze played Dalton. The series lasted four episodes before being cancelled. Bush also released a 60-minute training video, A Beginner's Guide To Professional Kickboxing, in 1992. Ringside Products and Asian World of Martial Arts distributed it. He played a terrorist in the film Major Payne, starring Damon Wayons, in 1995. He starred in the independent horror film Psycho Kickboxer, which premiered in 1997. In 2000, Bush was chosen to do the motion-capture and face scanning for the character "Cobra" in the Xbox video game Bruce Lee: Quest of the Dragon released in 2002. Bush continues to act and played an army sergeant in the ABC series LOST in 2006 and a naval officer in the 2012 film Battleship. In 2013, Bush auditioned and won a speaking role as Security Guard #3 in Season 3 of Hawaii Five O. Episode 3.23 "He welo 'oihana'. Bush then went on to appear in the new Magnum PI playing a police officer/detective for 5 years.

== Personal life ==
Bush was honored with "Curtis Bush Day" on April 27, 1995, by Mayor Meyera E. Oberndorf in Virginia Beach, Virginia. He currently lives in Oahu, Hawaii and works as a Registered Behavior Technician. .

== Championships and awards ==
=== Boxing ===
- United States Boxing Association
  - USBA Southern Light Middleweight (-69.9 kg/154 lb) Championship
  - USBA Southern Middleweight (-72 kg/160 lb) Championship

=== Kickboxing ===
- Virginia State Kickboxing
  - Amateur Virginia Welterweight (-67 kg/147 lb) Championship
  - Amateur Virginia Super Welterweight (-70 kg/154 lb) Championship
- Fight Factory Karate Association
  - FFKA United States Light Welterweight (-67 kg/147 lb) Championship
- International Sport Karate Association
  - ISKA Southeast Welterweight (-66.8 kg/147 lb) Full Contact Championship
  - ISKA North American Welterweight (-66.8 kg/147 lb) Full Contact Championship
  - ISKA North American Super Welterweight (-69.5 kg/153 lb) Full Contact Championship
  - ISKA World Welterweight (-66.8 kg/147 lb) Full Contact Championship
  - ISKA World Super Welterweight (-69.5 kg/153 lb) Full Contact Championship
  - ISKA World Light Middleweight (-72.3 kg/159 lb) Full Contact Championship
- World Karate and Kickboxing Organization
  - WKKO World Middleweight (-73 kg/160 lb) Championship
- World Kickboxing Association
  - WKA World Super Welterweight (-70 kg/154 lb) Full Contact Championship

== Boxing record ==
Boxing record
12 wins (10 KOs), 5 losses, 2 draws
Date	Result	Opponent	Venue	Location	Method	Round	Time	Record
1999-06-30	Loss	(United States) Elvis Alexander		Virginia Beach, Virginia, USA	TKO	9		12–5–2
For the NBA World Middleweight (-72.64 kg/160 lb) Championship.
1998-04-16	Loss	(United States) Elvis Alexander		Virginia Beach, Virginia, USA	TKO	9		12–4–2
For the NBA World Middleweight (-72.64 kg/160 lb) Championship.
1997-10-02	Win	(United States) Kevin Hall		Virginia Beach, Virginia, USA	Decision	12	3:00	12–3–2
Wins the USBA Southern Middleweight (-72.64 kg/160 lb) Championship.
1994-07-28	Draw	(United States) Kevin Hall		Virginia Beach, Virginia, USA	Technical draw	1		11–3–2
1994-02-03	Win	(United States) Lynn Jackson		Virginia Beach, Virginia, USA	TKO	10		11–3–1
Wins the USBA Southern Light Middleweight (-69.9 kg/154 lb) Championship.
1993-10-07	Draw	(United States) Lynn Jackson		Virginia Beach, Virginia, USA	Draw			10–3–1
1992-11-09	Win	(United States) Sherman Harris		Virginia Beach, Virginia, USA	TKO	6		10–3
1992-08-06	Win	(United States) Bubba Walters		Virginia Beach, Virginia, USA	TKO	4		9–3
1992-01-30	Win	(United States) Tony Rios		Virginia Beach, Virginia, USA	TKO	2		8–3
1991-11-21	Win	(United States) Calvin Moody		Virginia Beach, Virginia	DQ	4		7–3
1989-11-11	Loss	(United States) Dave Wyatt, Jr.	Arthur Ashe Athletic Center	Richmond, Virginia	KO	1		6–3
1987-06-25	Win	(United States) Len Robinson		Nags Head, North Carolina	KO	1		6–2
1987-03-05	Win	(United States) Chuck Davis		Virginia Beach, Virginia	TKO	1		5–2
1986-01-22	Loss	(United States) Kevin Vieldhouse	Harrah's Atlantic City	Atlantic City, New Jersey	Decision (majority)	6	3:00	4–2
1985-07-20	Loss	(United States) Mike Peoples	Norfolk Scope	Norfolk, Virginia, USA	Decision (split)	6	3:00	4–1
1985-03-13	Win	(United States) Tony Rios	Norfolk Scope	Norfolk, Virginia, USA	TKO	5	2:08	4–0

Legend: Win Loss Draw/no contest Notes

== Kickboxing record ==
Professional kickboxing record
42 wins (30 KOs), 10 losses, 2 draws, 2 no contests
Date	Result	Opponent	Event	Location	Method	Round	Time
1999-05-00	Loss	(United States) Tom Kimber	Mass Destruction	Lowell, Massachusetts, USA	Decision (unanimous)	12	2:00
For the IKF World Middleweight (-75 kg/165 lb) Full Contact Championship.
1997-00-00	Win	(Canada) Melvin Murray		Toronto, Ontario, Canada	Decision (majority)	10	2:00
Wins the ISKA North American Super Welterweight (-69.5 kg/153 lb) Full Contact Championship.
1997-05-00	Loss	(England) Mark Weller		Cambridge, England	TKO (punches)	8	
Loses the ISKA World Welterweight (-66.8 kg/147 lb) Full Contact Championship.
1996-00-00	Win	(Italy) Roberto Fatica	Dundonald International Ice Bowl	Belfast, Northern Ireland	TKO (left cross)	8	1:44
Retains the ISKA World Super Welterweight (-69.5 kg/153 lb) Full Contact Championship and wins the WKA World Super Welterweight (-70 kg/154 lb) Full Contact Championship.
0000-00-00	Win	(England) Tom Montgomery		Brighton, England	Decision	12	2:00
Wins the ISKA World Super Welterweight (-69.5 kg/153 lb) Full Contact Championship.
0000-00-00	NC	(France) Michel Louart		Montreal, Quebec, Canada	No contest	7	
1994-00-00	NC	(France) Toussaint Andarelli		Ajaccio, Corsica	No contest	3	
1992-00-00	Win	(France) Toussaint Andarelli		Ajaccio, Corsica	Decision	12	2:00
Retains the ISKA World Welterweight (-66.8 kg/147 lb) Full Contact Championship.
0000-00-00	Win	(Poland) Piotr Falender		Virginia Beach, Virginia, USA	KO	7	
Wins the ISKA World Welterweight (-66.8 kg/147 lb) Full Contact Championship.
1991-00-00	Loss	(Netherlands) Marlon Boldewijn		Amsterdam, Netherlands	Decision (unanimous)	12	2:00
0000-00-00	Win	(United States) Bubba Walters		Virginia Beach, Virginia, USA	KO	4	-
Wins the WKKO World Middleweight (-73 kg/160 lb) Championship.
1990-00-00	Win	(Cameroon) Emmanuel Essissima		Paris, France	Decision (split)	12	2:00
Wins the ISKA World Light Middleweight (-72.3 kg/159 lb) Full Contact Championship.
1989-00-00	Win	(United States) Chuck Cypress	ESPN Championship Karate	Portland, Maine, USA	TKO (corner stoppage)	4	0:23
Wins the FFKA United States Light Welterweight (-67 kg/147 lb) Championship.
0000-00-00	Win	(United States) Lafayette Lawson	Rumble on the River	New Orleans, Louisiana, USA	KO	7	
1987-00-00	Win	(United States) Robert Visitacion	Harrah's Lake Tahoe	Stateline, Nevada, USA	KO (left hook to the body)	2	1:22
Wins the ISKA North American Welterweight (-66.8 kg/147 lb) Full Contact Championship.
0000-00-00	Loss	(Canada) Paul Biafore			Decision	12	2:00
1987-00-00	Win	(Canada) Paul Biafore		Toronto, Ontario, Canada	KO	5	
0000-00-00	Draw	(Canada) Paul Biafore			Draw	10	2:00
0000-00-00	Win	(United States) Alan Watson		Paradise Island, Bahamas	KO	3	
Wins the ISKA Southeast Welterweight (-66.8 kg/147 lb) Full Contact Championship.
1985-00-00	Win	(Canada) Raynald Lamarre		Montreal, Quebec, Canada	TKO (punches)		
1985-00-00	Win	(United States) Cliff Thomas	PKA Karate	Atlanta, Georgia, USA	Decision (unanimous)	5	2:00
1984-00-00	Win	(United States) George Morrisey		United States	KO (left high kick)	6	
0000-00-00	Win	(United States) Roy McKown		United States	KO	3	
0000-00-00	Draw	(United States) Jerry Trimble		United States	Draw	12	2:00
0000-00-00	Loss	(United States) Richard Hill		United States	TKO	9	
0000-00-00	Win	(United States) Richard Hill		United States	KO	1	
0000-00-00	Win	(United States) Trevor Ambrose		United States	KO	2	
1983-00-00	Win	(Canada) Ken Comer		Gatineau, Quebec, Canada	KO (high kick)	5	
1983-06-11	Win	(United States) Jackie Dixon		Memphis, Tennessee, USA	KO	2	

Amateur kickboxing record
15 wins (11 KOs), 2 losses, 0 draws
Date	Result	Opponent	Event	Location	Method	Round	Time
1982-00-00	Win	(United States) Alphonzo Claiborne		Chesapeake, Virginia, USA	Decision	3	
Wins the Amateur Virginia Super Welterweight (-70 kg/154 lb) Championship.
1981-00-00	Win	(United States) Darnell Studavent		Virginia Beach, Virginia, USA	Decision	3	
Wins the Amateur Virginia Welterweight (-67 kg/147 lb) Championship.

Legend: Win Loss Draw/no contest Notes
