= Bill Morrison (kickboxer) =

American kickboxer

- Nationality: American
- Height: 6 ft 3 in (1.91 m)
- Division: Heavyweight
- Style: Karate, Tae Kwon Do
- Rank: Black Belt - Tae Kwon Do

Bill Morrison is a retired American karate and kickboxer, who was the PKA U.S. Heavyweight and Super-Heavyweight Champion from 1984 to 1985 and #1 contender for the world title.

== Early life ==
Bill Morrison's journey in martial arts began in July 1972, when he was 17. After being beaten up in his own front yard by someone much smaller than him, he decided to make a change. At the time, he described himself as uncoordinated, stiff, and weak — but training in karate quickly began to transform him.

He started practicing Ji Do Kwan/Tae Kwon Do under the guidance of Mr. Dave Adams from Kings Mountain, North Carolina. Adams had studied directly with Mr. Yoo Jin Kim of Stone Mountain, Georgia, and would go on to become both Bill's trainer and manager during his professional karate career.

In just 26 months, Bill earned his Black Belt. Shortly afterward, he joined the U.S. Navy and was stationed in Washington, D.C. While serving there, he had the chance to meet martial arts legend Jhoon Rhee and train at the Jhoon Rhee Institute, alongside PKA World Light Heavyweight Champion Jeff Smith (martial arts). After completing his military service, Bill committed himself fully to preparing for a career in kickboxing.

== Career ==
=== Karate/Full Contact Kickboxing ===
- Bill Morrison launched his professional karate career in June 1980 with a victory over Frank Knight in Myrtle Beach, South Carolina.
- In 1982 with a 10–1 record Bill fought Joe Lewis in full contact, losing by knockout.
- In 1983 Morrison, ranked #5 in the world, fought Anthony Elmore for the PKA World Superheavyweight title losing by unanimous decision.
- Ranked #3 in the PKA, Morrison defeated Richard Burke by KO in round 1 to earn a shot at the US PKA title.
- In June 1984, he faced the champion Big John Jackson in Merrillville, Indiana. Morrison secured a first-round knockout in what was scheduled as a nine-round bout, capturing the PKA U.S. Super Heavyweight Karate Championship and earning the position of #1 World Contender. The match, broadcast on ESPN, marked a career-defining moment.

=== Kickboxing(low kick rules) ===
- In 1987, Bill fought the world champion Maurice Smith for the World Kickboxing Association Kickboxing Heavyweight World title and lost by low kicks in round 8.

=== Retirement ===
- Morrison retired and went on to dedicate himself to education, teaching in the public school system in Gastonia, North Carolina.

== Personal life ==
- U.S. Navy Ceremonial Honor Guard 1974–1977.

== Film Credits ==
Film Credits

- Cyborg - 1988
- Getting Hal - 2001
- Contemporary Gladiator - 1988
- The Wizard Of Speed And Time - 1988
- Like Father Like Son - 1987
