= Steve Shepherd =

American kickboxer (1950–2021)

- Born: Stephen Shepherd; October 10, 1950; New York City, United States
- Died: May 12, 2021 (aged 70); West Palm Beach, Florida, United States; Complications of a fall
- Nationality: American
- Height: 6 ft 1 in (1.85 m)
- Weight: 160 lb (73 kg; 11 st)
- Division: Welterweight; Middleweight; Super Middleweight; Light Heavyweight
- Fighting out of: West Palm Beach, Florida, United States
- Years active: 1975–1999

Kickboxing record
- Total: 56
- Wins: 50
- By knockout: 27
- Losses: 5
- No contests: 1

Steve Shepherd (October 10, 1950 – May 12, 2021) was a five-time world kickboxing champion and a top pioneer kickboxing promoter in the state of Florida. He defeated eight world champions from five weight divisions, four of them during their championship reigns. He also decisioned future world champions Don Wilson, Ted Pryor, Dale "Apollo" Cook and Bob "Thunder" Thurman.

Promoting events between 1977 and 1999, Shepherd was the first kickboxing world champion who was also a major event promoter. In the 1970s, he helped make South Florida a capital for the then new sport. Promoting principally out of West Palm Beach Auditorium, he was the first kickboxer to draw over $1 million in live gate receipts. He further proved that the sport could be financially viable through regular live events at the same venue.

== Biography ==
Shepherd was born on October 10, 1950, in New York City, New York. He later moved to Lake Worth and West Palm Beach, Florida. Steve died on May 12, 2021, due to injuries sustained in an accident in November 2020.

He studied karate with Mark Herman and Paul Anselmo, earning his black belt in Shotokan-Goju karate, before turning to the pro-kickboxing ring in early 1975.

Shepherd opened his own karate school in West Palm Beach and also began promoting kickboxing matches. He maintained both ventures throughout his world championship career. After retiring from the ring, he trained, managed and promoted over 200 state, golden gloves national and world champions; both amateur and professional. He also ran Shepherd's Boxing & Kickboxing Center for over 25 years which became a favorite South Florida training facility for a multitude of popular champions: Don "The Dragon" Wilson, Bill “Superfoot” Wallace, Oscar De La Hoya, Zab Judah, Michael Moorer, Kassim Ouma and others.

In 1979, he founded Ringstar Promotions for his live event business (1979–1999), Ringstar Products for his kickboxing equipment and, in 2009, ArmorFit for his mixed martial arts equipment business.

== Fight career ==
Early on, Shepherd scored wins over Florida cult legends Gator Garland, Bill Clarke, Harold "Nature Boy" Roth (a.k.a. Harold Diamond), and Joe Marciano.

He first courted national attention in 1978 when he defeated Bob Ryan for the PKA version of the welterweight world championship (at 157 pounds). Six months later, in a bout broadcast over CBS-TV, he lost the title in a split decision to Earnest Hart, Jr. He rebounded in 1979, defeating Chris Gallegos for the WKA middleweight world title (at 160 pounds), and then became the first champion to unify the sport's two major crowns with a sixth-round knockout of Hart to regain the PKA welterweight world title. He was retroactively recognized as the undisputed STAR ratings world champion upon its founding in 1980.

In 1981, after double sanctioning his rubber match title defense against Hart, the PKA exercised its legal right to remove Shepherd as its champion owing to a dispute over broadcasting rights. A few months later, Earnest Hart won Shepherd's involuntarily vacated title; Hart was the same contender Shepherd had just knocked out for a second time.

In November 1981, Shepherd challenged PKA heavyweight world champion Demetrius "Oaktree" Edwards in an effort to embarrass the sanctioning body for having stripped his title. On the eve of that bout, the PKA withdrew its sanction for a heavyweight title defense. Nevertheless, while only a middleweight, Shepherd outpointed heavyweight Edwards in a 10-round non-title match in West Palm Beach, Florida, a feat that made him the first middleweight kickboxer ever ranked number-one in the heavyweight division. He was also recognized as “Fighter of the Year” by Official Karate magazine's 1982 Kickboxing Hall of Fame.

Previously, in early 1981, Shepherd knocked out Albuquerque's John Moncayo in the first round. However, in 1982 an improperly dieted and badly dehydrated Shepherd lost his title in Las Vegas over nationally syndicated TV to that same John Moncayo. Moncayo TKOed Shepherd with an overhand right that broke Shepherd's jaw. Moncayo also prevailed in the rubber match when Shepherd again sustained a broken jaw.

One year later, in 1983, Shepherd moved up in weight to capture the WKA super middleweight world title from Japan's Yasuo Tabata in a close split decision. Shortly afterward, he was diagnosed with a ruptured disk in his neck that most probably occurred during his extraordinary battle against heavyweight champion Demetrius Edwards. The disk had pinched a nerve and shortened the reach of his right arm. He would never again possess the hefty punching power that had made him a champion. He announced his retirement from active kickboxing in 1987, though he made periodic return appearances until 1999, and has scheduled a fight for March 2019.

In a 1987 retirement interview, Shepherd told South Florida's Sun-Sentinel newspaper that his biggest fight purse was $45,000.00 and his smallest was $150.00.

== Professional kickboxing record ==
Below is the documented professional ring record of Steve Shepherd from the S.T.A.R. ratings website. Shepherd fought 56 fights from February 1975 to June 1999. Of those fights, 50 were wins (27 knockouts), 5 were losses, and 1 was a no-contest. Shepherd dominated as a kickboxing World Champion in 10 bouts over 4 weight divisions for 4 sanctioning organizations. As a middleweight, he also defeated one heavyweight world champion in a non-title bout.

Kickboxing Record
50 wins (27 (T)KOs, 22 decisions), 5 losses, 1 no contests
Date	Result	Opponent	Event/Venue	Location	Method	Round	Time	Record
1999-06-18	Win	(United States) Don Steadman	I.S.K.A. event at National Guard Armory	West Palm Beach, Florida, United States	Decision	5		50-5-1
1998-11	Win	(United States) Tom Bentley	I.S.K.A. event at West Palm Beach Auditorium	West Palm Beach, Florida, United States	Decision	6		49-5-1
1994-09-24	Loss	(United States) Francis Farley	I.S.K.A. event at West Palm Beach Auditorium	West Palm Beach, Florida, United States	TKO	7	bell	48-5-1
I.S.K.A. full-contact-rules light middleweight world title bout
1993-06-19	Win	(United States) Francisco Campeon	I.S.K.A. event at West Palm Beach Auditorium	West Palm Beach, Florida, United States	KO	4		48-4-1
I.S.K.A. full-contact-rules light middleweight world championship elimination
1990-07-14	Win	(United States) Kevin Gruca	I.S.K.A. event at West Palm Beach Auditorium	West Palm Beach, Florida, United States	KO	3		47-4-1
1988-07-30	Loss	(United States) Robert Harris	I.S.K.A. event at West Palm Beach Auditorium	West Palm Beach, Florida, United States	Disqualification	7	2:00	46-4-1
I.S.K.A. full-contact-rules light middleweight world championship elimination; Shepherd disqualified for minimum kick infraction
1987-12-11	Win	(United States) Kevin Gruca	Independent event at West Palm Beach Auditorium	West Palm Beach, Florida, United States	Decision	6		46-3-1
1987-10-21	Win	(United States) William Knorr	W.K.A. event at West Palm Beach Auditorium	West Palm Beach, Florida, United States	Decision	5		45-3-1
1988-08-07	Win	(United States) Alan Watson	W.K.A. event at West Palm Beach Auditorium	West Palm Beach, Florida, United States	Decision	5		44-3-1
1984-10-20	NC	(United States) Larry McFadden	W.K.A. event at Palm Beach Junior College Auditorium	West Palm Beach, Florida, United States	No Contest	4		43-3-1
The W.K.A. transmuted this outcome to no-contest
1983-10-22	Win	(Japan) Yasuo Tabata	W.K.A. event at West Palm Beach Auditorium	West Palm Beach, Florida, United States	Decision (Split)	11		41-3-0
Wins W.K.A. international-rules super middleweight world title; Shepherd vacates title upon first retirement in January 1984
1983-08-19	Win	(United States) Jerry Jenson	W.K.A. event at West Palm Beach Auditorium	West Palm Beach, Florida, United States	KO	2		42-3-0
1983-07-08	Win	(United States) Joe Marciano	W.K.A. event at Diplomat Hotel	Hollywood-by-the-Sea, Florida, USA	KO	2		41-3-0
1982-11-06	Loss	(United States) John Moncayo	W.K.C. event at West Palm Beach Auditorium	West Palm Beach, Florida, United States	Decision	11		40-3-0
World Karate Council international-rules middleweight world title bout
1982-06-26	Loss	(United States) John Moncayo	W.K.A. event at Sands Hotel	Las Vegas, Nevada, United States	TKO	9		40-2-0
W.K.A. international-rules middleweight world title
1982-02-20	Win	(United States) Daryl Croker	W.K.A. event at West Palm Beach Auditorium	West Palm Beach, Florida, United States	KO	4		40-1-0
Retains W.K.A. international-rules middleweight world title
1981-11-19	Win	(United States) Demetrius Edwards	W.K.A. event at West Palm Beach Auditorium	West Palm Beach, Florida, United States	Decision (Split)	4		39-1-0
W.K.A. middleweight champion vs P.K.A. heavyweight champion non-title bout
1981-10-10	Win	(United States) Frank Knight	W.K.A. event at West Palm Beach Auditorium	West Palm Beach, Florida, United States	KO	5		38-1-0
1981-07-25	Win	(Australia) Dave Hedgecock	W.K.A. event at West Palm Beach Auditorium	West Palm Beach, Florida, United States	TKO	3		37-1-0
Retains W.K.A. international-rules middleweight world title
1981-05-02	Win	(United States) Bob Thurman	W.K.A. event at West Palm Beach Auditorium	West Palm Beach, Florida, United States	Decision	8		36-1-0
1981-04-22	Win	(United States) Frank Medina	Independent event at West Palm Beach Auditorium	West Palm Beach, Florida, United States	Decision	6		35-1-0
kickboxing versus boxing mix-match
1981-02-03	Win	(United States) John Moncayo	W.K.A. event at West Palm Beach Auditorium	West Palm Beach, Florida, United States	KO	1		34-1-0
1981-01-19	Win	(United States) Greg Smith	W.K.A. event at Brassy's Nightclub	Cocoa Beach, Florida, United States	TKO	6		33-1-0
1980-11-07	Win	(United States) Earnest Hart, Jr.	P.K.A. & W.K.A. event at West Palm Beach Auditorium	West Palm Beach, Florida, United States	KO	7		32-1-0
Retains P.K.A. full-contact-rules welterweight and W.K.A. middleweight world titles; first double-sanctioned bout in history; P.K.A. welterweight world title vacated by sanction in January 1981
1980-Fall	Win	(United States) Javier (surname unreported)	Independent event	Miami, Florida, United States	TKO	1		31-1-0
1980-Fall	Win	(United States) Frank Williams	Independent event	Miami, Florida, United States	KO	2		30-1-0
1980-Fall	Win	(United States) Julio Rodriquez	Independent event	Miami, Florida, United States	TKO	1	0:30	29-1-0
Three professional champion versus amateur bouts at one event
1980-07-26	Win	(United Kingdom) Arthur O’Laughlin	P.K.A. event at West Palm Beach Auditorium	West Palm Beach, Florida, United States	KO	6	1:32	28-1-0
Retains P.K.A. full-contact-rules welterweight world title
1980-05-17	Win	(United States) Mike Brennan	P.K.A. event at West Palm Beach Auditorium	West Palm Beach, Florida, United States	TKO	12		27-1-0
Retains P.K.A. full-contact-rules welterweight world title
1980-02-08	Win	(United States) Gary Baker	P.K.A. event at West Palm Beach Auditorium	West Palm Beach, Florida, United States	TKO	2		26-1-0
1979-10-19	Win	(United States) Earnest Hart, Jr.	P.K.A. event at West Palm Beach Auditorium	West Palm Beach, Florida, United States	KO	6	1:58	25-1-0
Wins P.K.A. full-contact-rules welterweight world title; first champion to unify P.K.A. and W.K.A. world titles; wins historic recognition as S.T.A.R. world middleweight world champion
1979-05-26	Win	(United States) Chris Gallegos	W.K.A. event at West Palm Beach Auditorium	West Palm Beach, Florida, United States	Decision	9		24-1-0
Wins W.K.A. international-rules middleweight world title
1979-03-07	Win	(United States) Dale Cook	Independent event at West Palm Beach Auditorium	West Palm Beach, Florida, United States	Decision	9		23-1-0
1979-01-13	Win	(United States) Benny Fernandez	P.K.A. event	Bradenton, Florida, United States	KO	2		22-1-0
1978-11-30	Win	(United States) Earnest Hart, Jr.	P.K.A. event	Atlanta, Georgia, United States	Decision	12		21-1-0
P.K.A. full-contact-rules welterweight world title bout
1978-10-20	Win	(United States) Pete Manchee	P.K.A. event at West Palm Beach Auditorium	West Palm Beach, Florida, United States	KO	4		21-0-0
1978-07-22	Win	(United States) Bob Ryan	P.K.A. event at West Palm Beach Auditorium	West Palm Beach, Florida, United States	Decision	9		20-0-0
Wins P.K.A. full-contact-rules welterweight world title
1978	Win	(United States) Jesse Brandt	Independent event	Stuart, Florida, United States	Decision	5		19-0-0
1978-04-15	Win	(United States) Rick Herranz	P.K.A. event at Palm Beach Junior College Auditorium	West Palm Beach, Florida, United States	KO	2		18-0-0
1977-12	Win	(United States) Bobby Sullivan	Independent event	Miami, Florida, United States	Decision	7		17-0-0
1977-11-15	Win	(United States) Jesse Brandt	Independent event at West Palm Beach Auditorium	West Palm Beach, Florida, United States	KO	1		16-0-0
1977	Win	(United States) Gator Garland	Independent event	Miami, Florida, United States	Decision	6		15-0-0
1977-09-10	Win	(United States) Bill Knoblock	P.K.A. event	Miami, Florida, United States	Decision	5		14-0-0
1977-07-16	Win	(United States) Ted Pryor	Independent event at West Palm Beach Auditorium	West Palm Beach, Florida, United States	Decision (Split)	7		13-0-0
1977-05-07	Win	(United States) James Sisco	Independent event	Ft. Lauderdale, Florida, United States	KO	5		12-0-0
1977-04	Win	(United States) Dennis Black	Independent event at Palm Beach Junior College Auditorium	West Palm Beach, Florida, United States	Decision	5		11-0-0
1977-03	Win	(United States) Harold Roth (Harold Diamond)	Independent event at Mr. America Contest	Ft. Lauderdale, Florida, United States	KO	2		10-0-0
1976	Win	(United States) Benny Fernandez	Independent event	Miami, Florida, United States	KO	1		9-0-0
1976-09-11	Win	(United States) Bill Clarke	P.K.A. event	Tampa, Florida, United States	Decision	7		8-0-0
Wins P.K.A. full-contact-rules middleweight South East regional title
1976	Win	(United States) Julio Rodriguez	Independent event	Miami, Florida, United States	KO	3		7-0-0
1976-08-14	Win	(United States) Napoleon Davis	P.K.A. event	Tampa, Florida, United States	KO	3		6-0-0
1976-08-07	Win	(United States) Dave Dean	P.K.A. & S.E.P.K.C. event	Tampa, Florida, United States	Decision	5		5-0-0
1976-07-31	Win	(United States) Rex Abernathy	P.K.A. event	Tampa, Florida, United States	Decision	5		4-0-0
1976-05-28	Win	(United States) Gary Felder	P.K.A. event	Tampa, Florida, United States	Decision	5		3-0-0
1975-11	Win	(United States) Don Wilson	Independent event	Miami, Florida, United States	Decision	3		2-0-0
1975-02	Win	(United States) Harold Roth	Independent event	Tampa, Florida, United States	TKO	3		1-0-0
Legend: Win Loss Draw/No contest Notes
