= Don Nakaya Nielsen =

American kickboxer

- Nielsen in Thailand, 2016
- Born: Donald Eugene Nielsen; July 4, 1959; Los Angeles, United States
- Died: August 16, 2017 (aged 58); Bangkok, Thailand
- Other names: Thunder
- Height: 1.88 m (6 ft 2 in)
- Weight: 84 kg (185 lb; 13 st 3 lb)
- Division: Heavyweight; Cruiserweight; Light heavyweight
- Style: Kickboxing; Muay Thai; Tang soo do
- Stance: Southpaw
- Trainer: Benny Urquidez; Master Toddy; Mike Stone
- Rank: Black belt in Tang soo do

Kickboxing record
- Total: 29
- Wins: 18
- By knockout: 18
- Losses: 11

Other information
- Occupation: Kickboxer, professional wrestler, actor, chiropractor

Donald Eugene “Nakaya” Nielsen (July 4, 1959 – August 16, 2017) was an American kickboxer, professional wrestler, actor, and chiropractor. Best known for his lengthy tenure in professional martial arts, Nielsen was an international competitor who held the WKA US Cruiserweight Championship for much of his career and fought in one of the earliest mixed martial arts-style matches of Japan. As an alternative medicine practitioner, Nielsen played an active role in legalizing chiropractic practice in Thailand.

== Early life ==
Nielsen was born in Los Angeles on July 4, 1959, to Howard and Beth Nielsen. He began his formal martial arts training at age 10, studying tang soo do under a cousin who operated a dojo owned by Chuck Norris. Competition in karate soon followed. He attended Whittier College on an athletic scholarship, playing football and majoring in pre-medicine.

== Career ==
=== Kickboxing ===
After winning a Golden Gloves title in amateur boxing, Nielsen moved on to professional kickboxing. He established himself in the WKA, amassing an early record of 12–4 with all wins coming by way of knockout. The golden days of his career began with his winning the WKA US Cruiserweight Championship: holding the title for most of his fighting days, Nielsen made his name as an aggressive knockout artist who defeated his opponents within the early rounds. His willingness to compete internationally led him to fight and train in Japan, where he embraced his Japanese heritage en route to becoming one of the country's most popular sports stars. With Japanese fans accepting him as one of their countrymen, he represented Japan in international bouts and was one of the nation's only heavyweight kickboxers during his career.

In 1987 Nielsen was ranked number 6 in the world by ISKA in the super heavyweight division.

In May 1989, Nielsen entered world-class competition by challenging budding superstar Kevin Rosier for his WKA World Super Heavyweight Championship. With a record of 14–2, Rosier was half as experienced as Nielsen but was significantly taller and maintained a weight advantage of over 45 pounds (20.4 kilos). Frustration between the fighters rose as the number of committed fouls mounted and Nielsen slowed the match's pace by repeatedly falling to the canvas. The fight ended in the sixth round when a visibly angered Rosier threw Nielsen onto the ring ropes and landed an unprotected blow to the face, leading to a technical knockout.

Nielsen attempted to make up for this loss later in the year with a contest against Rob Kaman, a Dutch Muay Thai stylist attaining legendary status as an international champion. Nielsen sought to match his opponent's signature low kicks but found himself repeatedly swept by Kaman's legs before being knocked out by a surprise right hook. The following year, Nielsen met future world champion Masaaki Satake in the latter's debut match. Nielsen swarmed his less-experienced opponent early on but was unsettled by Satake's repeated headbutts, eventually dropping his guard and being knocked out by a right hook.

In the following three years, Nielsen continued to fight internationally, winning the WKA International Heavyweight Championship in 1992 but still falling short of world titles. His final match took place in September 1993 at the K-1 Illusion event, for the UKF World Heavyweight Championship, against returning opponent Masaaki Satake. More experienced at this time, Satake fought primarily with counter-strikes, rarely allowing even a single one of Nielsen's blows to go unrequited. He knocked Nielsen down three times within the opening round, leading to a TKO loss as per K-1 rules.

=== Pro wrestling ===
Nielsen's kickboxing success allowed an easy expansion to professional wrestling, which he participated in alongside his fighting career. A participant of the shoot wrestling style, Nielsen's matches were designed to look as realistic as possible with Nielsen wearing boxing gloves to emphasize his kickboxing background. His list of opponents from 1986 to 1993 includes ring legends Akira Maeda, Keiichi Yamada, and Yoshiaki Fujiwara. He wrestled primarily for New Japan Pro-Wrestling.

=== Mixed martial arts ===
Nielsen's most famous sporting endeavor was a one-time event in the budding field of mixed martial arts. On October 4, 1992, he met Ken Shamrock in a mixed rules bout - the first time in Japan that a pro wrestler had fought a kickboxer in televised no-holds-barred competition. Nielsen was quickly submitted by Shamrock, who took advantage of his opponent's limited grappling experience and the fact that Nielsen had opted to wear boxing gloves. The match elevated Japanese interest in MMA competition and helped lead to the formation of Pancrase Hybrid Wrestling.

=== Acting ===
Nielsen made his acting debut in the 1984 film Fear City, playing an uncredited role as a boxer. He upgraded to larger roles in the 1990s, playing villains in the Dale Cook vehicles Blood Ring, Fist of Steel, and Blood Ring 2.

=== Chiropractic ===
Nielsen earned a chiropractic doctorate from Cleveland University-Kansas City in 1986 and was nationally certified in 1988. He began treating patients immediately after graduation. Beginning in 1987, he traveled to Thailand to train at Muay Thai gyms, where he treated his fellow kickboxers and learned that chiropractic wasn't widely practiced in the country. He subsequently partnered with Paolo Memorial Hospital and participated in monthly charity tours – offering chiropractic treatment to far-flung and impoverished villages. Seeking to establish chiropractic as a legitimate business in Thailand, he opened Dr. Don's Center for Natural Health in March 1993.

As chiropractic was not yet adopted by Thailand's Ministry of Public Health, Nielsen's enterprise brought him into conflict with authorities - at one point being arrested and charged with practicing medicine without a license and running a clinic without a permit. Though allowed to continue his business, he was required to do so under physical therapy and nursing licenses. Nielsen consequently became an activist, advocating that chiropractic be legally practiced without oversight by the Medical Council of Thailand. In 2006, as the result of various efforts, chiropractic became a legal profession in the country and Nielsen was able to practice freely.

During his career, Nielsen served within many organizations furthering chiropractic practice, including the Subcommittee of Chiropractic via the Ministry of Public Health; he served from 2005 to 2009. He was the co-founder and vice president of the Thailand Chiropractic Association, secretary of the steering committee under the Asian Chiropractic Federation, president of the Thailand chapter of the Federation International du Chiropractique de Sportif (FICS), and founder and president of the Thailand International Chiropractic Organization (TICO). He was also the founder and first president of the Chiropractic Association of Thailand and the founder of the Bio Energy Asia clinic in Bangkok.

== Death ==
On August 14, 2017, Nielsen underwent surgery in Bangkok to treat an infection on his legs that had caused sepsis and renal failure. During the procedure, he suffered a heart attack and fell into a coma. More heart attacks followed, and Nielsen died within two days of his admission of the hospital. He was 58 years old.

Nielsen's death was observed in Thailand and the United States. In Bangkok, funeral and cremation rites were performed at the Wat That Thong temple from August 22 to August 24. On September 16, a wake was held at the Rolling Hills Method Church in Los Angeles.

== Personal life ==
Nielsen was married to his wife Cheryl, and the couple had three sons: Corey, Casey, and Colby. He also had three brothers: Scott, Greg, and Jon.

Nielsen was trilingual, being fluent in English, Japanese, and Thai.

== Fighting style ==
An aggressive fighter characterized by his powerful striking ability, Nielsen synthesized his boxing and martial arts skills into a formidable offensive technique. He engaged his kickboxing opponents head-on, frequently forcing them into a corner or against the ropes and pummeling them with roundhouse kicks and punches. Nielsen was capable of a more intricate approach as well, utilizing lunging attacks with precision striking reminiscent of karate point fighting. He was a knockout-focused fighter, with 22 of his wins in late 1992 being the result of KO.

Nielsen's primary weakness was his defense, which was exploited by world champion-level opponents. Future K-1 Grand Prix '94 runner-up Masaaki Satake was able to control his rematch against Nielsen with counter strikes, and multi-time world champion Rob Kaman knocked him down repeatedly during their bout with his signature low kicks.

== Championships ==
World Kickboxing Association

- WKA United States Cruiserweight Champion
- WKA International Heavyweight Champion

Universal Kickboxing Federation

- UKF International Heavyweight Champion

== Notable Kickboxing Bouts ==
Date	Result	Opponent	Event	Method	Round	Time	Location	Record
September 4, 1993	Loss	(Japan) Masaaki Satake	K-1 Illusion	TKO (3 knockdowns/Right hook)	1	2:30	Osaka, Japan	
Fight was for the vacant UKF World Heavyweight title.
May 22, 1993	Win	(Japan) Yoshiteru Hiraoka	AJKF Evolution Step-3	KO (Left high kick)	2	2:37	Tokyo, Japan	
November 14, 1992	Win	(United States) Jean-Claude Leuyer	AJKF in Las Vegas	TKO (Referee stoppage/Punches)	1	0:26	(United States) Las Vegas, US	
Wins the vacant WKA International Heavyweight Championship.
June 30, 1990	Loss	(Japan) Masaaki Satake	AJKF Inspiring Wars - Heat	KO (Right hook)	1	2:07	Tokyo, Japan	
Nielsen's corner protested the outcome, claiming he lost due to an illegal headbutt.
September 5, 1989	Loss	(Netherlands) Rob Kaman	AJKF Super Bout	KO (Right hook)	3		Tokyo, Japan	
May 14, 1989	Loss	(United States) Kevin Rosier	AJKF Knockout of the Century - Part 3	TKO (Referee stoppage/Right uppercut)	6	1:05	Tokyo, Japan	
Fight was for Rosier's WKA World Super Heavyweight title.
January 29, 1989	Win	(Mexico) Victor Agre	AJKF Clash of the Century I	KO	1	0:19	Japan	
1989	Win	(United States) Lavelle Robinson		KO (Left hook)	1		(United States) Tulsa, US	
March 27, 1987	Win	(United States) Charlie Archie	NJPW Inoki Toukon Live II	KO (Left high kick)	3	0:30	Osaka, Japan	
April 13, 1985	Loss	(United States) Jerry Rhome	PKA The Battle of Atlanta	TKO (Right cross)	4	1:19	(United States) Atlanta, US	
Fight was for Rhome's PKA US Heavyweight title.
November 10, 1984	Loss	(United States) Curtis Crandall	World Kickboxing Championships	KO	1		(United States) Reno, US	
Fight was for the vacant WKA World Super Light Heavyweight title.
September 27, 1984	Loss	(United States) Brad Hefton	PKA Full Contact Karate	KO (Left hook)	6	1:36	(United States) San Jose, US	
January 20, 1984	Loss	(United States) James Warring	WKA Full Contact Karate	KO (Front kick)	3		Ciudad Juárez, Mexico	
Fight was for the vacant WKA World Cruiserweight title.
July 1983	Loss	(United States) Tom Hall	PKA Full Contact Karate	TKO	2		(United States) Milwaukee, US	
The match ended after Nielsen fell out of the ring.
1983	Loss	(United States) Maurice Smith		Decision	7	2:00	(United States) Las Vegas, US	
-	Win	(United States) Craig Kringle	WKA Full Contact Karate	TKO (Referee stoppage)	1	1:09	(United States) Crystal Bay, US	
Wins the WKA US Cruiserweight title.
March 29, 1980	Win	(United States) Chavez	WKA Full Contact Karate	TKO (Referee stoppage/Left hook)	2	0:53	(United States) Las Vegas, US	

== Mixed martial arts record ==
=== Mixed rules ===
0 Wins, 1 Loss, 0 Draws
Date	Result	Opponent	Event	Method	Round	Time	Location
October 4, 1992	Loss	(United States) Ken Shamrock (as Wayne Shamrock)	PWFG Stack of Arms	Submission (Americana)	1	0:44	Tokyo, Japan

== Filmography ==
Year	Title	Role	Notes
1984	Fear City	Kid Rio	Uncredited
1991	Blood Ring	Don Carlio	
1992	Fist of Steel	Wires	Also known as Eternal Fist
1995	Bloodring 2	Caruko	
