= Superfoot =

Superfoot may refer to:

- Bill Wallace (martial arts) (born 1945), American martial artist and actor
- Johnny Morris Davis (born 1962), American kickboxer
- Board foot, a unit of measurement in the timber industry
