= Brad Hefton =

American kickboxer

- Born: Bradley William Hefton; August 19, 1959 (age 67)
- Other names: Bad Brad Hefton
- Nationality: American
- Height: 6 ft 3 in (1.91 m)
- Division: Super Heavyweight Heavyweight Cruiserweight
- Style: Karate, Full Contact Kickboxing
- Trainer: John Monczak

Brad Hefton is a retired full contact kickboxer and actor from Rockford, Illinois. He is a former PKA World Heavyweight Champion, ISKA Full Contact Super Heavyweight World Champion, and Professional Karate Commission World Superheavyweight Champion. Hefton was also the S.T.A.R. World Cruiserweight champion.

== Acting Credits ==
As an actor he is known for his role of Frank Ellis in the 1992 movie Blackbelt, starring Don "The Dragon" Wilson.

== Full Contact Kickboxing Career ==
In 1981 he fought Curtis Crandall on NBC SportsWorld with Hefton winning by unanimous decision. In 1982 Hefton fought Cedric Rogers on ESPN. He defeated Rogers by TKO in the 4th round.

In 1983, Hefton defeated Tom Hall for the Professional Karate Association (PKA) World Heavyweight title. Brad was also recognized as the S.T.A.R. world cruiserweight champion. In September 1984 he fought Don Nakaya Nielsen in a non-title bout on ESPN winning by KO in the 6th round.

In 1985 Hefton fought Curtis Crandall in a rematch defending his PKA World Heavyweight title. Hefton won by KO in round 9. In that same year Hefton defeated Kerry Roop by KO retaining his title, defeated George Clarke by KO in a non-title bout, and defeated PKA European and French Heavyweight champion Philippe Coutelas by KO retaining his title. In November 1985 Hefton defeated Jeff Hollins by decision. In 1985, Hefton was named Blackbelt Magazine Full Contact Fighter of the Year. He was also considered the undisputed Cruiserweight champion by the STAR system in 1985.

In 1985 Jerry Rhome competed for the PKA North American Heavyweight title which qualified him for a shot at the world title against Hefton. After being defeated by Jerry Rhome for the PKA World Heavyweight title in April 1986, Hefton record moved up to 29-2-1 while Rhome moved to 34-2. Hefton would then move to the super heavyweight class. In 1986, Hefton defeated Melvin Cole for the Professional Karate Commission (PKC) United States Super Heavyweight title.

In 1987, Hefton claimed the Professional Karate Commission (PKC) World Super Heavyweight title by defeating Anthony Elmore. In 1987, Hefton was ranked number 2 in the world in the Full Contact Super heavyweight division by ISKA.

In 1988, Hefton defeated WKA champion Raymond Horsey for the ISKA Full Contact Super Heavyweight World title. In 1991 Hefton defended his PKC and ISKA title against Sergio Batarelli winning by decision. In that same year, the Professional Kickboxing Organization (PKO) had him ranked as the #2 Super Heavyweight in the world.

In 1992, one on the most memorable fights came in Hefton's career. The 30-year old Hefton stepped into the ring with 19-year old Vitali Klitschko and took a shot that broke his arm. Hefton went eight more rounds and lost by 12 round decision. The bout was for the ISKA Full Contact World Super Heavyweight Championship.

ESPN named him the Face of Kickboxing in The 1980's. "He was a big guy that kicked like a middleweight".

Brad was considered one of the stars in kickboxing when it got regulated and was one of the greats that could skillfully perform kicks above the waist.

Hefton was regarded as one of the most popular/standout fighters of his era, used to be the main event star in ESPN and even in defeat, such as his bouts against Jerry Rhome, fans continued to admire his explosive style characterized by high-flying kicks, powerful punches, and full-contact intensity. Guided behind the scenes by his coach and mentor John Monczak, Hefton became known for his fierce, intimidating presence in the ring, which proved overwhelming for opponents including Kerry Roop, “Big John” Jackson, Anthony Elmore, Don Nakaya Nielsen, Jeff Hollins, and many more. Hefton was inducted into the Illinois Martial Arts Hall of Fame in 2014 alongside trainer and fellow Rockford native John Monczak.

Hefton has a strong connection with his trainer John Monczak in which he compared to Rocky and Mickey. "We’ve been together since we were 13", Hefton said. "He’s almost been like a second dad to me. It was nice to see both of us get inducted". Hefton said if it wasn’t for him, I wouldn’t have got anywhere. His trainer said, "You always like to see your students do well. For both of us to get recognized, it feels really good."

== Titles ==
All Title Won

- S.T.A.R. World Cruiserweight Champion.
- Professional Karate Association (PKA) World Heavyweight Champion.
- ISKA Full Contact Super Heavyweight World Champion.
- Professional Karate Commission (PKC) Super Heavyweight World Champion.
- Professional Karate Commission (PKC) United States Super Heavyweight Champion.
- BKC Champion.
