= Alvin Prouder =

American kickboxer

- Born: Columbus, Mississippi, U.S.
- Nationality: American
- Height: 6 ft 1 in (185 cm)
- Weight: Super-welterweight; Welterweight

Professional boxing record
- Total: 9
- Wins: 8
- Losses: 1

Kickboxing record
- Total: 37
- Wins: 34
- By knockout: 27
- Losses: 3

Alvin Prouder is a former American professional kickboxer, former professional boxer, former sport Karate fighter and actor. Alvin is a former Professional Karate Association and World Kickboxing Association champion. Prouder was inducted into the Martial Arts Hall of Fame in 2022.

== Early life ==
Prouder was born in Columbus, Mississippi and later moved to Culver City, California with his sister Cynthia Prouder, who is also a former professional kickboxer, former professional boxer and actor. Prouder trained at the Black Karate Federation school at 42nd and Crenshaw Blvd. in Los Angeles, which was under the leadership of Sijo Muhammad. When Prouder was 25 he was shot in the head over a gang fight involving his cousin. Prouder recovered, but the incident ended his kickboxing and boxing career. Prouder continued to compete in martial arts tournaments after his recovery, winning Ed Parker's International tournament in 1989. He continued to compete in martial art events for over a decade after his recovery.

== Professional career ==
In March 1979 Prouder won the World Kickboxing Association Super Welterweight title against Toshihiro Nishiki. In March 1980, Prouder retained his Super Welterweight title by TKO against Marc Costello in Las Vegas, Nevada. In 1980 the STAR System World Kickboxing Ratings had Prouder as the Super Welterweight champion.

In 1981 Prouder defeated Elbert Moore by first round knockout. In April 1982, Prouder lost a Super-Welterweight title fight to Bob Thurman via unanimous decision. In July 1982, Prouder defeated Jeff Gripper by TKO to win the Professional Karate Association Welterweight title.

In 1984, Prouder defeated Dwayne Wyatt via TKO. In February 1985, Prouder lost the Professional Karate Association Welterweight title to Johnny Davis via decision. In November 1985, Prouder regained the Professional Karate Association Welterweight title against Ricky Haynes.

== Boxing ==
Prouder fought as a professional boxer from 1983 to 1985. He fought 9 fights winning 8 and losing only 1.

== Acting ==
Prouder appeared in the 1993 film Full Contact starring Jerry Trimble.

== Hall of fame ==
Prouder was inducted into the Martial Arts Hall of Fame in 2022.
