= Paul Maslak =

American film producer

Paul Maslak is an American independent movie producer, book author, newsstand magazine editor and kickboxing historian.

== Early life ==
Paul Maslak was born in Washington, District of Columbia in the United States of America. He competed in high school wrestling and amateur boxing and, while attending college, he studied Judo, Taekwondo, Isshin-ryu, Bando, Northern Shaolin and Shorin-ryu.

He graduated from the University of Maryland with a Bachelor of Science in business administration, followed by film school at the University of California at Los Angeles (UCLA).

Maslak authored two books, Strategy in Unarmed Combat and What The Masters Know, based on a statistical study he undertook of contrasting fighting styles in professional boxing, full-contact karate (early kickboxing), Japanese kick-boxing, Judo and collegiate wrestling.

== Martial Arts Career ==
While editor of Inside Kung Fu magazine, he founded the STAR System World Kickboxing Ratings in 1980. These ratings were initially created as a mechanism for pressing tournament karate directors to adopt identical minimum safety procedures.

With the help of colleague John Corcoran, a former PKA events coordinator and then editor of KICK Illustrated magazine, he expanded the STAR ratings into professional kickboxing in response to the organizational partisanship of the contender rankings generated by the sport's major sanctioning bodies.

As magazine editor, Maslak introduced the use of statistical analysis to sport karate and kickboxing. He played a significant role in the national adoption of safety equipment and the mandatory seeding of top competitors in major national open tournaments. He also successfully advocated for the establishment of separate women's divisions for both kata and kickboxing competition. In 1979, he co-authored the Schlesinger Rules System of Martial Arts Competition with prominent tournament karate and kickboxing referee Tom Schlesinger. He also wrote the first Official Rules of the World Karate Association in 1980 as well as the revised Official Rules of the World Kickboxing Association: Third Edition, in 1987. After leaving Inside Kung Fu in late 1981, he discontinued the STAR tournament ratings.

Focusing thereafter on the professional kickboxing ring, the STAR System became the premier rating service for international kickboxing throughout the 1980s as syndicated in some 15 martial arts and sports magazines across the world. The ratings were statistically controlled and computer generated as opposed to the traditional opinions of judges method. They utilized the same technique developed to rank international chess masters. They were the first combative sport ratings that entirely reflected objective fight outcomes, with ratings points pro-rated according to the prominence of opponents. More than one contender frequently held the same ranking.

Maslak served as the first ratings commissioner for both the WKA and KICK, then two of the sport's three major sanctioning bodies. The STAR ratings were recognized as the official ratings source for those organizations. He dissolved the STAR System World Ratings for Professional Kickboxing in early 1989 when his business and family obligations became too demanding of his time.

== Movie Career ==
While working for The Walt Disney Company as a project planner on EPCOT and Tokyo Disneyland, Maslak took an evening job as editor of Inside Kung Fu magazine. In this latter capacity, he was invited by Jackie Chan producer Ng See-yuen to work as casting director on the martial arts film, No Retreat, No Surrender, for which he helped "discover" Jean-Claude Van Damme, Kurt McKinney, Ernie Reyes, Jr. and Cynthia Rothrock.

Afterwards, Maslak pursued a two-track career for several years, working as a manufacturing production control executive in corporate America by day, and free-lancing as a story analyst for HBO and TriStar Pictures by night. He left his corporate job to manage martial arts actors, occasionally taking jobs in hands-on film production with several independent movie producers such as Roger Corman, Joseph Merhi and Ashok Amritraj. He worked his way through the ranks of many low-budget films, co-scripting a half dozen independently produced motion pictures. In 1993, he formed a partnership to produce indie features commencing with Red Sun Rising starring Don "The Dragon" Wilson and, in 1996, he began directing with the film Sworn to Justice starring Cynthia Rothrock. In total, Maslak produced 12 motion pictures including: The Right Temptation with Kiefer Sutherland, Primary Suspect with William Baldwin and Kiss Toledo Goodbye with Christopher Walken.
