= Glenn Keeney =

American martial artist (1942–2021)

Glenn R. Keeney
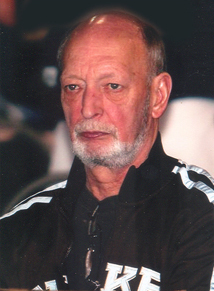
- Glenn Keeney in 2011
- Born: May 6, 1942; Anderson, Indiana
- Died: November 18, 2021 (aged 79)
- Style: Goju-ryu Karate
- Teachers: Larry Pickle-Oknawan Goju-Ryu, L. Kim-Korean Stylist, James Wax, Robert Yarnall, Greg Helm, and Ed Erler -Shorin-ryu, Phillip Koeppel-Matsumura Seito Shorin-ryu
- Rank: 10th dan (degree) black belt

Other information
- Website: http://pkchq.com

Glenn R. Keeney (May 6, 1942 – November 18, 2021) was an American martial artist. He was born to Walter Russell and Lucy Puckett Keeney in Anderson, Indiana in 1942, and began his karate training in 1957.

== Early influences ==
In 1957, finding no local martial arts schools for training, he hitchhiked 115 miles from Anderson to the nearest karate school (a Taekwondo dojang) in Cincinnati, Ohio. He later found a school in Indianapolis, but the school closed the same year it opened.

Keeney began his study of Okinawan Goju Ryu in 1964, after meeting Larry Pickel in Anderson. Pickel, a black belt under Eiichi Miyazato had studied in Okinawa while in the US Marine corps. Keeney studied under Pickel until 1967 when Jerry Brown, Glenn Keeney and Larry Davenport, the top 3 students, were offered the opportunity to purchase the school. By 1969, Keeney had become the sole owner of Komakai Academy, which he ran until 2005. Brown and Davenport stayed on at the school for many years.

Bill Wallace, who would later become the Professional Karate Association World Middleweight Champion, was attending Ball State University at that time. Although he chose not to adopt the Goju Ryu system, Wallace and Keeney sparred several days a week and attended over 200 tournaments together over the next 5 years. Bill Wallace credits a lot of his sparring savvy to these early workouts with Glenn Keeney.

== Competitor ==
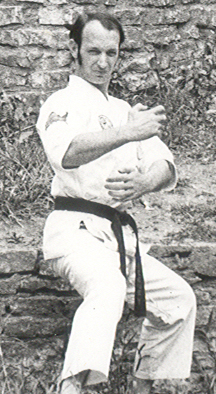
Glenn Keeney in 1971, during his time as a karate fighter

Glenn Keeney, an active competitor from 1967 to 1975, competed in more than 300 tournaments. Glenn defeated many of the nation's best fighters such as Bill Wallace, Artis Simmons, Walt Bone, Johnny Castaldo, Woodrow Fairbanks, Parker Shelton, Ken Knudson, Flem Evans. As a member of the 1971–1972 USKA World Champion Team, he traveled throughout Europe and Asia on two Good Will Tours. The 1971–72 Team went undefeated both years. In 2012 he was inducted into "Madison County's 100 Greatest Athletes".

== Tournament promoter and entrepreneur ==
Keeney held his first karate tournament in 1968, and went on to host the 1970 and 1971 United States Karate Association Grand National Championships in Anderson, Indiana (the largest USKA tournament promoted to that date). He was voted Best tournament promoter by the USKA 4 years running. He co-hosted the 1975 Top Ten Nationals in Anderson, Indiana, with Mike Anderson of Professional Karate Magazine, again with great success. In 1980, he promoted the PKA, CBS televised Bill Wallace retirement fight in Anderson, and was subsequently presented with the "Key to the City" by Mayor McMahon. Working again with the PKA and ESPN he went on to promote the 1981/82 PKA Nationals. He continues as an active promoter, hosting the Professional Karate Commission's International Karate Championships each year in Indianapolis, Indiana.

As an administrator, Keeney assisted in writing the USKA rule book for tournament competition. He functioned as Rules Chairman for 10 years. For several years, he headed up the ratings committee for the PKA, and at the First Los Angeles World Championships in 1974 he participated as a judge.

== Founder ==
Keeney founded the (PKC) Professional Karate Commission in 1986. It began as a sanctioning body for Full Contact Kickboxing. Upon the death of Grand Master Robert A. Trias in 1989, Keeney further developed the Professional Karate Commission as a membership organization and sanctioning body to include sport karate competition and dedicated the organization to the preservation of the principles, ethics, and integrity of Karate-Do.

Grand Master Glenn R. Keeney held the rank of 10th dan, Hanshi of Okinawan Goju-ryu, and was ranked in Judo and Ju-Jitsu. His devotion to karate was held in high regard by both peers and students alike, continuing to teach seminars and clinics into his later years.

== Notable awards and honors ==
- Trias International Society – Inducted by Robert A. Trias, Father of American Karate
- Black Belt Magazine – Hall of Fame 1977, inducted as Instructor of the Year
- Black Belt Magazine – Rated #4 as a Top Ten Fighter in the U.S. 1972
- USKA #1 Rated Fighter 1972–73
- 1980 Presented "Key to the City of Anderson" by Mayor McMahon of Anderson, Indiana
- 2012 Inductee "Madison County's 100 Greatest Athletes" Published by Anderson Herald Bulletin

== Most noted student ==
Ross Scott – Professional Karate Association (PKA) World Heavyweight Full Contact Kickboxing Champion 1977 and 1980 (defeated Joe Lewis in a 1975 non-title bout)

== Personal life and death ==
Keeney died on November 18, 2021, at the age of 79. He was survived by his wife of 36 years, Marsha Keeney, and his three daughters, Beth Ann, Glenna, and Sholin. He also had seven grandchildren and four great-grandchildren.
