= Cliff Thomas (kickboxer) =

American kickboxer

- Born: El Paso, Texas, U.S.
- Nationality: American
- Height: 5 ft 10 in (178 cm)
- Weight: Middleweight; Light welterweight; Lightweight; Super Lightweight

Professional boxing record
- Total: 4
- Wins: 3
- Losses: 1

Kickboxing record
- Total: 77
- Wins: 69
- Losses: 5
- Draws: 3

Cliff Thomas is a former American professional kickboxer, former professional boxer and actor from El Paso, Texas. Known as "Magic", and "The Black Knight of Kickboxing", he is a former 7-time world champion, across five weight divisions, in the PKA, ISKA and KICK organizations between 1980 and 2003. He was also the STAR undisputed lightweight champion in 1980.

He was the first fighter in PKA history to win world titles in two separate weight divisions. The first kickboxer to win a world title in three different weight divisions. The first and only kickboxer of his time to become a four-time, five-time, six-time, and ultimately a seven-time world champion. He was never officially knocked down or knocked out in his career. Thomas is known for his southpaw stance, crab style defense and his left hook. His final record is listed as 69 Wins, 5 Losses, and 3 Draws.

== Early life ==
Thomas underwent open-heart surgery as a child, leaving him with 152 stitches in the shape of a cross on his chest. He was not expected to live past age twelve. Yet, Thomas began his martial arts journey in 1972 at the age of 14 in his hometown of El Paso, Texas. His first instructor was Robert Nava, under whom he trained and earned his Black Belt in 1976. He also earned a fourth degree black belt in Chinese Kenpo Karate and a fifth degree black belt in Tae Kwon Do.

His early training laid the foundation for a professional kickboxing career. To prepare for it, he began full contact training in 1979 under notable kickboxing instructors Demetrius Havanas and Ishmael Robles, with Rocky Galarza serving as his primary boxing coach.

== Professional career ==
In August 1980 Thomas defeated the previously undefeated Gordon Franks by 3rd-round TKO to win the PKA Super Lightweight World Championship. On January 24, 1981, Thomas defeated Richard Jackson by decision to retain world title. In April 1981 Thomas knocked out Gary Ortiz in the 2nd round. While on Jul 24, 1981 Thomas beat previously undefeated Paul Vizzio by TKO on NBC SportsWorld to retain title. Thomas finished out the year in November 1981 losing his world title to Paul Vizzio at Madison Square Garden.

In May 1982 Thomas defeated Tony Lopez by decision. On August 14, 1982, Thomas TKO'd Norris Williams in the 10th round to win the PKA Lightweight World Championship (becoming a two-division champion). In November 1982 he defeated Tony Gutierrez to retain Lightweight Title. In March 1983 Thomas lost a decision, and the Lightweight Title, to Tony Rosser. In August 1983 he defeated Tony Rosser in a rematch to regain the Lightweight Title (becoming a three-time world champion).

On February 16, 1984, Thomas defended his title with a 3rd-round KO of Robert Visitacion. In April 1984 he defeated Tommy Williams by 8th-round TKO to win the PKA Light Welterweight World Championship (becoming a four-time champion and simultaneously holding two titles). On April 8, 1984, Thomas vacated the Light Welterweight title due to PKA rules preventing a competitor from holding multiple titles. In August 1984 he defended the Lightweight Title by TKOing England's Nick McClellan in the 7th round. On November 3, 1984, he defeated George Sorrell by 4th-round TKO.

In 1985 Thomas defended the Lightweight Title against Kevin Hillhouse, Gary Garner, and Byron Robinson, winning all by KO. In 1985, Thomas fought Curtis Bush in a non-title bout in Atlanta, Georgia and lost by unanimous decision over five rounds. In 1986 Thomas also lost the PKA World Lightweight title in a decision to Leo Loucks.

On March 14, 1987, Thomas KO'd Thomas Chesterfield in the 9th round to win the ISKA Light Welterweight World Championship (becoming a five-time champion). He later KO'd Chesterfield again in an 8th round rematch. In August of1988, Thomas defended his ISKA title by KO'ing Eric Melton in the 4th round. On October 8, 1988, he defeated Davy Johnston by TKO in the 3rd round.

Thomas retired, but came out retirement on May 25, 2002, and KO'd Canada's Thomas Downing in the 5th round to win the KICK Middleweight World Championship (becoming a six-time champion). Then on Sep 29, 2002 he KO'd North American Champion Michael Corleone to win another KICK World Championship (becoming a seven-time champion at age 45).

== Boxing ==
Between 1979 and 1987 Thomas was also a professional boxer. During that time he compiled a record of 3 wins and only 1 loss against Humberto Lucero.

== Acting ==
Thomas had acting roles in Lone Wolf McQuade starring Chuck Norris. He also had roles in the movies Key Witness as well as Paper Dragons.
