= Dale Cook =

American martial artist (born 1958)

- Born: November 24, 1956 (age 69); Tulsa, Oklahoma, United States
- Other names: Apollo
- Height: 1.83 m (6 ft 0 in)
- Weight: 73 kg (161 lb; 11.5 st)
- Division: Middleweight; Super Middleweight; Light Heavyweight; Cruiserweight
- Style: Boxing; kickboxing; Taekwondo
- Stance: Orthodox
- Fighting out of: Tulsa, Oklahoma, U.S.
- Team: Apollo's Martial Arts
- Rank: 7th degree black belt in Taekwondo
- Years active: 1977-1996

Professional boxing record
- Total: 22
- Wins: 19
- By knockout: 10
- Losses: 2
- Draws: 1

Kickboxing record
- Total: 99
- Wins: 93
- By knockout: 54
- Losses: 5
- Draws: 1

Other information
- Notable students: Randy Blake, Todd Hays, Maurice Smith, Kevin Morby

Dale Cook (born November 24, 1958; often billed as Dale "Apollo" Cook) is an American former kickboxer who competed in the middleweight, super middleweight, light heavyweight and cruiserweight divisions. With a background in Boxing and Taekwondo, Cook debuted professionally in 1977 and spent the early part of his career as a full contact rules fighter. In the 1980s, he began fighting under Oriental and Muay Thai rules and took two world titles under the WKA banner. A short stint in shoot boxing towards the end of his career in the mid-1990s resulted in another world title in that discipline.

An occasional actor, Cook also starred in several action-oriented B-movies in the early 1990s.

== Career ==
Nicknamed Apollo, Dale Cook began practicing martial arts with taekwondo at the age of fifteen and eventually earned the rank of seventh degree black belt. After taking up kickboxing, he turned professional in 1977 and rose to prominence . Having fought exclusively under the full contact rule set in the beginning of his career, he later ventured into Oriental rules in the 1980s.

In 1983 Cook won the Professional Karate Association United States Welterweight title by defeating Randy Mack. In 1984 defended his title against Babe Gallegos winning by KO, and he beat Brad Rischer by KO. In 1985 Cook defeated Dwayne Wyatt by decision.

He won a world title on February 28, 1987, when he beat Pascal LePlat to claim the WKA world middleweight (-72.5 kg/159.8 lb) title. In 1988 Cook defended his Middleweight title against, former PKA and WKA Super Welterweight champion, David Humphries winning by decision. Following this, he added the WKA super middleweight (-76 kg/167.6 lb) strap to his mantle.

During the late 1980s and early 1990s, Cook challenged six Muay Thai stylists from Thailand, defeating five of them and losing once, a second-round KO at the hands of Changpuek Kiatsongrit on June 30, 1990, in Tokyo, Japan. On July 30, 1992, he fought Toshiyuki Atokawa at the Kakutogi Olympics II in Tokyo in a kickboxing/full contact karate hybrid match. Rounds one and three were fought with boxing gloves, and rounds two and four bare-knuckle with punching to the face disallowed. Cook won on points, and the pair rematched under Seido karate rules on October 4, 1992, in the opening round of the '92 Karate World Cup in Osaka, Japan. The first round was ruled a draw and went to an extension round after which Atokawa won on all five judges' scorecards.

He continued to fight in Japan where he won the shoot boxing world title before retiring in 1996.

After his retirement, Cook opened Apollo's Martial Arts karate and kickboxing gym in his hometown of Tulsa. Among his students are K-1 heavyweights Randy Blake, Todd Hays and Ralph White, as well as the Oklahoma Destroyers World Combat League team. Another notable student was 6 year old Kevin Morby. He also runs the Xtreme Fighting League, an Oklahoma-based promotion which features both kickboxing and mixed martial arts matches.

== Championships and awards ==
=== Kickboxing ===
- Professional Karate Association
  - PKA United States Welterweight Championship
- World Shoot Boxing Association
  - WSBA World Championship
- World Kickboxing Association
  - WKA World Middleweight (-72.5 kg/159.8 lb) Championship
  - WKA World Super Middleweight (-76 kg/167.6 lb) Championship

== Boxing record ==
Boxing record
19 wins (10 KOs), 2 losses, 1 draw
Date	Result	Opponent	Venue	Location	Method	Round	Time	Record
1987-08-14	Win	(United States) Donald Tucker		Tulsa, Oklahoma, USA	KO	3	1:47	19-2-1
1986-09-09	Win	(United States) Marcellus Jackson		Tulsa, Oklahoma, USA	Decision	6	3:00	18-2-1
1986-06-17	Win	(United States) Ed O'Ryan		Tulsa, Oklahoma, USA	TKO	3		17-2-1
1985-08-18	Win	(United States) Carmelo Garcia		Tulsa, Oklahoma, USA	Decision	8	3:00	16-2-1
1984-11-07	Draw	(United States) Franklin Owens		Tulsa, Oklahoma, USA	Draw	6	3:00	15-2-1
1984-06-18	Win	(United States) Leroy Barnes		Tulsa, Oklahoma, USA	KO	3		15-2
1984-03-29	Win	(United States) Henry Drummond	Showboat Hotel and Casino	Las Vegas, Nevada, USA	Decision	4	3:00	14-2
1984-02-03	Loss	(United States) Nathan Dryer		Las Vegas, Nevada, USA	Decision	6	3:00	13-2
1983-10-08	Loss	(United States) Tony Harrison		Oklahoma, USA	Decision	10	3:00	13-1
1983-09-17	Win	(United States) Joseph Humphrey	Showboat Hotel and Casino	Las Vegas, Nevada, USA	KO	2		13-0
1983-06-12	Win	(United States) Rocky Pidgeon		Muskogee, Oklahoma, USA	Decision	6	3:00	12-0
1983-03-12	Win	(United States) Clyde Spencer		Tulsa, Oklahoma, USA	Decision	4	3:00	11-0
1983-01-27	Win	(United States) Mike Lair	Hilton Inn West	Oklahoma City, Oklahoma, USA	Decision (unanimous)	6	3:00	10-0
1982-11-21	Win	(United States) Larry Smith	Rock Palace	Tulsa, Oklahoma, USA	KO	3		9-0
1982-08-07	Win	(United States) Clyde Spencer	Little Dixie's Ballroom	McAlester, Oklahoma, USA	Decision	4	3:00	8-0
1982-06-15	Win	(United States) Clyde Spencer		Muskogee, Oklahoma, USA	Decision	4	3:00	7-0
1982-02-07	Win	(United States) Rocky Brown		Tulsa, Oklahoma, USA	Decision	4	3:00	6-0
1981-11-11	Win	(United States) Bobby Knight		Tulsa, Oklahoma, USA	KO	4		5-0
1981-07-17	Win	(United States) Leslie Smith		Muskogee, Oklahoma, USA	KO	3		4-0
1981-04-10	Win	(United States) William Curtis		Tulsa, Oklahoma, USA	KO	1		3-0
1981-02-22	Win	(United States) William Curtis		Tulsa, Oklahoma, USA	KO	2		2-0
1981-01-15	Win	(United States) Larry Smith		Tulsa, Oklahoma, USA	KO	3		1-0
Legend: Win Loss Draw/no contest Notes

== Karate record ==
Karate record
Date	Result	Opponent	Event	Location	Method	Round	Time
1992-10-04	Loss	(Japan) Toshiyuki Atokawa	'92 Karate World Cup, First Round	Osaka, Japan	Decision (unanimous)	2	2:00
Legend: Win Loss Draw/no contest Notes

== Kickboxing record ==
Kickboxing record
94 wins (54 KOs), 4 losses, 1 draw
Date	Result	Opponent	Event	Location	Method	Round	Time
1996-00-00	Win	(United States) Mark King		Tulsa, Oklahoma, USA	Decision (unanimous)	5	3:00
1992-07-30	Win	(Japan) Toshiyuki Atokawa	Kakutogi Olympics II	Tokyo, Japan	Decision	4	3:00
1990-06-30	Loss	(Thailand) Changpuek Kiatsongrit	AJKF: Inspiring Wars Heat 630	Tokyo, Japan	KO (punches)	2	1:28
1990-00-00	Win	(Thailand) Superman Osotsapa		Tulsa, Oklahoma, USA	Decision	5	3:00
1989-00-00	Win	(Thailand) M Penchandei		Manchester, England	Decision	5	3:00
1989-00-00	Win	(Thailand) Harnsu Premchai		Tokyo, Japan	Decision	5	3:00
1989-00-00	Win	(Thailand) Ismael Changani		Tokyo, Japan	KO	2	
0000-00-00	Win	(Thailand) Prasert Sitsoi		Tokyo, Japan	KO	3	
0000-00-00	Win	(Japan) Sikki Taira					
0000-00-00	Win	(South Korea) Moon Do-Sang					
0000-00-00	Win	(South Korea) Song Ki-Padula					
0000-00-00	Loss	(United States) John Moncayo		United States			
0000-00-00	Win	(United States) David Humphries			Decision (unanimous)	10	2:00
Retains the WKA World Middleweight (-72.5 kg/159.8 lb) Championship.
1987-06-12	Win	(United States) Donald Tucker			KO	1	
Wins the WKA World Middleweight (-72.5 kg/159.8 lb) Championship.
1987-02-28	Win	(France) Pascal Leplat		Tulsa, Oklahoma, USA			
0000-00-00	Win	(United States) Dwyne Wyatt		Oklahoma City, Oklahoma, USA	Decision (unanimous)	7	2:00
1984-11-00	Win	(United States) Brad Rischer		Oklahoma City, Oklahoma, USA	KO (left hook)		
1984-04-00	Win	(United States) Babe Gallegos		Tulsa, Oklahoma, USA	KO (punches)	2	2:00
Retains the PKA United States Welterweight Championship.
0000-00-00	Win	(United States) Dan Magnus		Tulsa, Oklahoma, USA	Decision (unanimous)	9	2:00
Wins the PKA United States Welterweight Championship.
1983-05-00	Win	(United States) Randy Mack					
1981-00-00	Win	(United States) Babe Gallegos			Decision		
0000-00-00	Win	(United States) Gene McComb					
0000-00-00	Win	(United States) Ernie Hart, Jr.					
0000-00-00	loss	(United States) Billy Jackson					
1980-00-00	Win	(England) Arthur O'Laughlin		Tulsa, Oklahoma, USA	Decision (unanimous)	9	2:00
1979-03-07	Loss	(United States) Steve Shepherd		West Palm Beach, Florida, USA	Decision	9	2:00
Legend: Win Loss Draw/no contest Notes

== Filmography ==
Film
Year	Title	Role	Notes
1991	Fist of Glory	Jake Reynolds	
1991	Blood Ring	Max Rivers	
1992	Eternal Fist	Amp	
1992	Deadend Besiegers	Gaijin who beats Wuwech	
1992	Triple Impact	Dave Masters	Direct-to-video
1993	American Kickboxer 2	Mike Clark	
1994	Double Blast	Greg	Direct-to-video
1995	Raw Target	Johnny Rider	
1995	Blood Ring 2	Max Rivers	
