= Paul Vizzio =

American kickboxer (born April 1952)

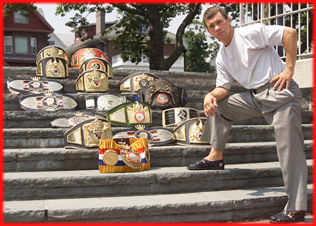
- Paul Vizzio with his championship belts
- Born: 1951 or 1952 (age 73–74); New York, New York, U.S.
- Nationality: American
- Height: 5 ft 4 in (163 cm)
- Weight: Featherweight; Light welterweight; Lightweight; Super Lightweight

Kickboxing record
- Total: 48
- Wins: 47
- By knockout: 36
- Losses: 1

Paul Vizzio (born April 1952) is a retired American martial arts and kickboxing champion from Manhattan, New York. After establishing himself through underground bare-knuckle fights, his professional kickboxing career spanned from 1979 to 2002, during which he won multiple world titles in organizations like the PKA, KICK, and Professional Karate Commission. He was also the STAR undisputed lightweight champion in 1981. During his professional kickboxing career, he compiled a record of 47 wins, with 36 knockouts, against a single loss, his final bout was at approximately 54 years old.

Following his professional fighting career, Vizzio transitioned into teaching, operating his school, Wai Mo Kwoon, in New Jersey. He has trained a diverse roster of students, including celebrities like Morgan Fairchild and Olympic athletes, whom he trained in kung-fu and kickboxing.

== Early life ==
Vizzio grew up in a tough environment in Alphabet City, Manhattan in the 1950s and 60s. He described it as a hard life in a poor neighborhood. To survive, he became part of a gang and only received a 7th grade education before having to quit school to work to help his family. His early introduction to combat sports began at around age seven at the local Tompkins Square Boys' Club, now known as The Boys' Club of New York, where he started boxing and wrestling. He fought frequently at the club, developing a reputation as a knockout artist and losing only one fight in over 100 bouts.

== Introduction to martial arts ==
His fascination with martial arts began when he was 12 years old after seeing Kung-Fu practitioners breaking bricks and cinder blocks. Determined to learn, he began studying Fu Jow Pai (or "Tiger Claw System") in New York's Chinatown under Grandmaster Wai Hong around 1968. He trained 7 days a week and even slept at the school.

This training led him into the world of underground matches in 1969. These were bare-knuckle, no-holds-barred fights, often with little to no protective gear, fought on platforms or wooden floors. On April 24, 1977 Vizzio fought one of these bouts against Lee Man Chin (Ming Chin Lee). This was a highly publicized event in Chinatown and posted in The China Post. Lee, a grandmaster of the Shou Shu (or "Seven Animals System"), had issued a public challenge and Vizzio accepted on behalf of his teacher, Grandmaster Wai Hong. Vizzio knocked Lee out in 5.8 seconds with a punch to the eye.

== Professional kickboxing career ==
Toyotaro Miyazaki, a Shotokan karate master and a lifelong friend of Vizzio, encouraged him to transition to professional kickboxing. Vizzio's professional kickboxing career spanned from 1979 to 2002. His trainers included Emilio Narvaez, a professional boxer and PKA World Light Heavyweight Champion, and Phil Borgia, a noted boxing trainer who also trained fighters like Kevin Kelley and Arturo Gatti. Vizzio used a diverse and flashy kicking game, which included everything from fundamental front kicks to complex jumping spinning heel kicks, to manage range and set up boxing from his bladed stance and crab style guard.

In 1979, Vizzio defeated Kent Johnson in a lightweight bout. He also defeated Johnson in a rematch that same year. In 1980, Vizzio defeated Richard Jackson for the US PKA Light Welterweight Title. He also defended his title that year by winning against Mike Bell, a former PKA US Light Welterweight champion.

In 1981, Vizzio defended his US PKA title in a rematch against Bell. On Jul 24 1981, Vizzio challenged Cliff Thomas for the PKA World Super Lightweight title. The bout was televised on NBC SportsWorld with Vizzio losing by a TKO. On November 3, 1981, Vizzio fought in a rematch against Thomas, where Vizzio won by a unanimous decision, thus capturing the World PKA title at Madison Square Garden.

In 1982, Vizzio defended his World title, now renamed the Featherweight title, by defeating Richard Jackson in a rematch. He also defeated Jeff Payne, and Roy Kleckner. In 1983, Vizzio defeated US PKA Featherweight champion Yoel Judah, defending his PKA World Featherweight title. Vizzio also retained his title by winning a rematch against Judah. He also defeated Joe Soto in that same year and retained his Featherweight title.

After the PKA folded in 1986, Vizzio began to fight for titles in other organizations. In 1993, Vizzio defeated Dale Frye to win the KICK Lightweight title. In 1994, aged 42, Vizzio defeated Juan Torres to both defend his KICK title and win the PKC Lightweight Title.

Between 1995 and 2000, Vizzio defeated Hector Pena, Doug Whitaker, Woon Shin, Juney Hale and Devon Cormack. In 2002, Vizzio fought his final bout vs. Parsieshvilli Gotcia. At the time, Vizzio was approximately 50 years old and capped an unprecedented career of longevity with a final win.

== Trainer and teacher ==
During his professional career, Vizzio's reputation as a world champion attracted high-profile students including Morgan Fairchild who trained with Vizzio for 11 months while she was in New York performing in soap operas. Vizzio trained Kevin Padilla, an Olympian, and Herbert Perez, an Olympic Gold Medallist, in kickboxing, applying his combat expertise to enhance their athletic prowess.

After his professional fighting career, Vizzio dedicated his life to teaching kung-fu and kickboxing. Vizzio began teaching even during his competitive peak and continued full-time after his final title defenses. He operates his school, Wai Mo Kwoon, in Fairfield, New Jersey, and also teaches in other centres.

== Personal life ==
Vizzio resides with his wife and four children in New Jersey. His personal interests include golf, dancing, and enjoying the community. Vizzio's students include his four children: Veronica ("Peaches"), Vanessa ("Twinkie"), Valentina ("Kitti"), and Paul Jr. ("Twizz"). All four studied kung-fu and kickboxing extensively with Vizzio.
