= Anthony Elmore =

American kickboxer

- Born: Memphis, Tennessee, U.S.
- Nationality: American
- Height: 6 ft 3 in (191 cm)
- Weight: Heavyweight; Superheavyweight

Professional boxing record
- Total: 2
- Wins: 1
- Losses: 1

Kickboxing record
- Total: 36
- Wins: 31
- Losses: 5

Anthony Elmore born in 1953 is a retired American kickboxing champion and professional boxer from Memphis, Tennessee. He was a PKA World Super Heavyweight Champion, PKA World Heavyweight champion, Professional Karate Commission World Super Heavyweight champion, KICK World Heavyweight champion and KICK World Super Heavyweight champion. He was also the STAR undisputed Heavyweight champion in 1982. His record is listed as 31 wins, against only 5 losses.

== Biography ==
Elmore was born and raised in Memphis, Tennessee. At the age of 15, he began studying Japanese Shotokan Karate under his Memphis teacher, Julius L. Dorsey. In 1982, he became the first kickboxer to gain a sponsorship from a major corporation, landing a personal service contract with Coors Beer. He had many of his fights broadcast on ESPN. He wrote, produced, directed, and starred in the 1988 semi-autobiographical film, The Contemporary Gladiator (also released as Iron Thunder).

He founded the Safari Initiative aimed at bringing African-style furnishings and products to a global market. He has advocated for U.S. government support for this initiative to help modernize African trade. He also created an all African home in Memphis as a showcase and cultural bridge. In 2009, Congressman Steve Cohen commended Elmore on the House floor for his work in advancing U.S.-Africa cultural understanding.

== Professional career ==
Elmore is a martial artist from Memphis, Tennessee, recognized as a five-time World Karate/Kickboxing Champion. His career is notable not only for his success in the ring but also for his role as a pioneer who helped popularize the sport.

Elmore won the PKA world Heavyweight Champion title on May 29, 1982, in Memphis. He defeated Demetrius Edwards to win his first world championship in a 12-round fight. In 1983 Elmore defended his PKA World Superheavyweight title against Bill Morrison winning by decision. In 1983 Elmore defeated Tony Palmore by TKO in the 10th round. He also defeated John Jackson.

In 1984 Elmore fought Tracy Thomas to defend his PKA Superheavyweight Title, winning by TKO in the 9th round. Also in 1984, he fought a rematch against Palmore in Miami. In that bout Elmore set a world record of throwing 190 kicks, but lost a split decision and his PKA Superheavyweight Title. In 1984 Elmore also defeated "Super" Ray Williams to win the KICK World Superheavyweight title. Elmore also fought a non-title bout against William Eaves with Elmore winning by KO due to the three knockdown rule being in effect.

In 1985 Elmore defeated Bill Morrison in a rematch for the vacant KICK World Heavyweight championship. Elmore was ranked #1 under the STAR ratings for Heavyweight in 1985.

In 1986 he defended his KICK World Heavyweight title by beating Jeff Hollins by decision. In 1986 Elmore defeated the KICK US Heavyweight champion M. Cole by TKO in the 12th round defending his KICK World title.

In 1987 he defeated Cole in a rematch. In April 1987 Elmore lost his PKC World Superheavyweight title to Brad Hefton by doctor stoppage due to an eye injury in the 12th round.

In 1990 Elmore fought Stan Longinidis losing a decision and his KICK World Superheavyweight Title. Longinidis vacated the KICK Superheavyweight title shortly after winning.

In 1991 Elmore was the #12 ranked Superheavyweight by the PKO. In 1999, after a 3-year layoff, Elmore fought Dennis Alexio for the IKF heavyweight title losing by KO in the 12th round.

== Boxing ==
Elmore made his pro boxing debut in 1981 losing to Steffen Tangstad. He fought again in 1984 winning against Sonny Barch.
