= Joe Corley =

American martial artist

- Born: Atlanta, Georgia, United States
- Other names: "Gentleman" Joe
- Style: American Karate, Tae Kwon Do & Kickboxing System
- Teachers: Kim Daeshik, Pat E. Johnson
- Rank: 10th Degree Black Belt

Other information
- Children: Christiana
- Website: http://www.joecorley.com/

Joe Corley is an American karate and kickboxing competitor, instructor, broadcaster and promoter who helped achieve the success of the Professional Karate Association and the early establishment of professional kickboxing in the United States. Joe Corley is CEO of PKA Worldwide.He holds a 10th degree black belt as he is very good at karate and won multiple U.S karate championship. He was a top ranked middle contender in full-contact karate. He opened the Atlanta's first full time karate school in 1967( originally teaching Tang soo do/ tae kwon and later American karate). His school network, formerly marketed as Joey corley Karate,evolved into Atlanta extreme warrior martial arts.

== Early years ==
Joe Corley began studying Tang Soo Do at age 16. At 19 he earned his black belt from Master Kim Dae Shik and together with Chris McLoughlin they opened the first full-time martial arts studio in Atlanta in 1967 called Kim Institute of Karate. The term karate was used instead of tae kwon do because of its name recognition in America at the time. Joe Corley subsequently rebranded the studio as Joe Corley Karate when Master Kim relocated to Austin, Texas. Joe Corley won the National Karate Grand Championship in 1979, 1981, 1982; the Southeast Grand Championship in 1977; and the Southern US Open in 1987 and 1982. Corley also founded Joe Corley's American Karate System in 1972. Joe Corley and his partner in the studios, Chris McLoughlin founded the Battle of Atlanta World Karate Championship in March 1970 and personally ran the Battle of Atlanta until 2013; it was then transferred to Truth Entertainment.

== Later career ==
In 1974 the first televised Full Contact Karate matches of the PKA made their way onto television. Joe Corley served as a judge at the first World Championship in 1974 and then challenged Bill Superfoot Wallace in May 1975 at the Battle of Atlanta VI in Atlanta's Omni. Joe Corley worked with fellow martial arts promoters and instructors like Glenn R Keeney and Jerry Piddington to organize and promote the sport of Full Contact Karate. The sport was covered by Sports Illustrated. In 1977 Mr. Corley became a partner in the Professional Karate Association (PKA), which was a martial arts organization instrumental in establishing professional kickboxing as a sport in the United States. Corley also became a commentator for American Karate on national television, along with Chuck Norris and Pat Morita, appearing on NBC, CBS, ESPN, Showtime, USA Network, SportsChannel America, Prime Network and Fox Sports South.

In February 1990, Corley was featured in a Black Belt Magazine article. Joe Corley was named Man of the Decade by Official Karate magazine and was inducted into the Black Belt Magazine Hall of Fame as Man of the Year in 1998. He appeared in the documentary films Modern Warriors (2002) and Mystic Origins of the Martial Arts (1998). He also appeared in the Joe Lewis film Force Five in 1985.

On June 15, 2013, Joe Corley was presented the Joe Lewis Eternal Warrior Award by the Joe Lewis Fighting System, an honor bestowed on the martial arts athletes who had distinguished themselves in the ring of point karate and/or kickboxing.

On June 16, 2016, Master Corley was promoted to the rank of 10th Degree Black Belt, Grand Master, by the Professional Karate Commission (PKC). The certificate was presented by Grand Master Glenn Keeney, president of the PKC, along with Grand Master Allen Steen, and was also approved by Grand Masters Pat Johnson and J. Pat Burleson.

In August 2017 Grand Master Corley was featured on the cover of Who's Who in the Martial Arts Legends Edition along with Grand Masters Bill "Superfoot" Wallace, Jeff Smith, and Bill Clark. It was prominently featured in Lifetime Achievement section.

In April 2018, Combat Go, a new 24/7 Martial Arts channel announced a partnership with PKA Kickboxing to provide programming for its new channel. In 2022, Joe Corley restructured the PKA into PKA Worldwide and began the 2022 Search for the Greatest Strikers on the Planet with fellow Grand Masters Jeff Smith and Bill Wallace.

He served as Master Instructor at Atlanta Extreme Warrior, founded in 2010, which includes Joe Corley Karate in its curriculum. Master Corley stopped teaching full-time in 2019 and focused his full-time professional efforts on expanding the sport of kickboxing.
