= Demetrius Havanas =

American martial artist

Demetrius Havanas (born 1950, Dallas, Texas died July 1981, Cookeville, Tennessee), known as 'The Golden Greek', was a third degree karate black belt and kickboxer. He won more than 90 consecutive tournaments in forms and fighting competition, and won 13 grand championships in 1971. He was ranked in the top ten of American Karate fighters between 1971 and 1975.

== Martial arts career ==
A somewhat short but muscular five foot five inch welterweight and middleweight full contact fighter, Havanas won 125 consecutive tournament bouts as a brown belt. In 1974, Havanas won the grand championship at the United States Karate Association Grand Nationals. He then won the Texas State Karate Championship for six years in succession. He won the Louisiana State Championships four times in succession, and also Allen Steen's U.S. Karate Championships three years in a row. From 1975 on, Havanas was focused on his professional kickboxing career and was totally committed to kickboxing.

In 1975, entering full-contact competition, he won the PKA U.S. Welterweight Championship. He amassed a record of 39-4 with 24 knockouts, and the Star System ranked him number-one world welterweight contender in 1980-81.

== Death ==
Havanas was en route to Atlantic City, New Jersey to work the corner of Cliff Thomas, who was defending his World Title, but Havanas was killed on July 23, 1981 in an airplane accident. He was buried in Restland Memorial Park in Dallas Texas. Pallbearers included martial arts grandmasters Skipper Mullins, Jack Hwang and Chuck Norris. Norris had been in town filming a movie at the time. Havanas was posthumously inducted into the World Taekwondo Hall of Fame, the American Karate Black Belt Hall of Fame and the Texas Martial Arts Hall of Fame.

== Legacy ==
Havanas was also a top flight martial arts and kickboxing instructor, and his legacy influences many of today's top martial artists. While most of Havana's most remembered professional kickboxing bouts are lost to time, a few rare bouts were saved by fans and can still be found on YouTube or elsewhere online in the public domain.

- Demetrius Havanas Versus Fred Wren, 1973 U.S. Championships, no longer available
- Demetrius Havanas versus Marc Costello, U.S. Middleweight championship Part I
- Demetrius Havanas versus Marc Costello U.S. Middleweight championship Part II
- Demetrius Havanas versus Charles Hartgraves
- Demetrius Havanas versus Bob Jarrett
- Demetrius Havanas versus Bob Ryan
- Demetrius The Greek Havanas versus Frank Holloway, World Karate Association title bout, March 29, 1980
