= Jeff Smith (martial arts) =

American martial artist, born 1953

- Born: Jeffrey Smith; United States
- Nationality: American
- Height: 5 ft 11 in (1.80 m)
- Weight: 185 lb (84 kg; 13.2 st)
- Division: Light Heavyweight
- Style: Taekwondo

Kickboxing record
- Total: 33
- Wins: 32
- By knockout: 16
- Losses: 1
- Draws: 0

Jeff Smith is an American martial arts instructor, best known as the former seven-time PKA World Light Heavy Weight Karate Champion. One of his title defense matches was on the undercard for the Ali vs. Frazier "Thrilla in Manila."

Jeff Smith began his Tae Kwon Do Training in Texas in 1963 with a Jhoon Rhee Branch there. While finishing up college he was recruited by Jhoon Rhee to move to Washington, DC and help run that organization. We worked as Instructor, Branch Manager, Head Instructor, then Vice President until 2005 when he opened his own "World Champion Jeff Smith Schools."

Jeff Smith operated martial arts schools in Virginia where he taught Tae Kwon Do, in which he holds the title of grandmaster. Jeff Smith received his first black belt and all of his black belt ranks through ninth degree from Jhoon Rhee.

On April 6, 2007, Jeff Smith was inducted into the Taekwondo Hall of Fame.

On June 15, 2013, Jeff Smith was the first to be presented the Joe Lewis Eternal Warrior Award, along with Bill "Superfoot" Wallace and Chuck Norris at the Battle of Atlanta World Karate Championship.

On June 16, 2016, Jeff Smith was promoted to the rank of Grand Master—10th Degree Black Belt—by the Professional Karate Commission at the Battle of Atlanta World Karate Championship XLVIII. His promotion was presented by Grand Masters Glenn Keeney, Allen Steen, Pat Johnson and Pat Burleson.

On August 4, 2017, Grand Master Jeff Smith was featured on the cover of the Who's Who in the Martial Arts Legends Edition and in the Lifetime Achievement section.

Jeff Smith is the COO and Director of Instruction for Stephen Oliver's Mile High Karate an international chain of Martial Arts Schools founded in 1983 by Stephen Oliver.

Jeff Smith is Co-Author with Stephen Oliver of "Extraordinary Teaching: Volume 1: Transform Your Martial Arts School Into a Leadership Academy" and, "Extraordinary Teaching Workbook - Your Implementation Guide and Training Notebook: A 90-day, step-by-step field guide for martial arts school owners" both published in 2026

He is currently the COO and Director of Instruction for Martial Arts Wealth Mastery. A coaching and consulting company for Martial Arts Schools, BJJ Academies, and MMA Gyms.

Jeff Smith is the President of Sports Operations for PKA Worldwide.
