= Johnny Davis (kickboxer) =

American kickboxer (born 1962)

- Born: Johnny Morris Davis; July 15, 1962 (age 64); Dillon, South Carolina, United States
- Other names: Superfoot
- Nationality: (United States) American
- Division: Welterweight; Middleweight
- Style: Karate, Kickboxing
- Fighting out of: Rocklin, California, United States
- Rank: 6th degree black belt in Karate
- Years active: -1988

Kickboxing record
- Total: 31
- Wins: 25
- By knockout: 13
- Losses: 6
- Draws: 0

Johnny Morris Davis (born July 15, 1962) is an American former kickboxer who competed in the welterweight and middleweight divisions. Nicknamed "Superfoot", Davis held numerous titles including two world championships.

== Career ==
Johnny Davis was born in Dillon, South Carolina, and currently resides in the Carolinas. He began martial arts training in karate and eventually reached the rank of second degree black belt. After a successful run competing in point fighting tournaments, he made the jump to full contact kickboxing.

From 1980 to 1984, he won numerous regional kickboxing titles before beating Alvin Prouder for the PKA World Welterweight Championship in Denver, Colorado on February 2, 1985. In 1987, he won the Fight Factory Karate Association Championship and also won the ISKA U.S. Middleweight Championship that year in a bout featured on ESPN. Davis' final record was 25 wins and 6 losses, with 13 wins by knockout.

Davis retired in 1988 but continued to stay involved in martial arts. In 1996, he promoted several kickboxing matches in California and became involved with the IKF. In 2002, he released an autobiographical training manual entitled The Art of Kickboxing, and started his own promotional company, AK Promotions.

== Championships and awards ==
=== Kickboxing ===
- Fight Factory Karate Association
  - FFKA World Championship
- International Sport Karate Association
  - ISKA United States Middleweight (-75 kg/165.3 lb) Full Contact Championship
- Professional Karate Association
  - PKA North Carolina Light Middleweight Championship
  - PKA South Eastern Welterweight Championship
  - PKA East Coast Welterweight Championship
  - PKA World Welterweight Championship
