= Bill Wallace (martial artist) =

American martial artist (born 1945)

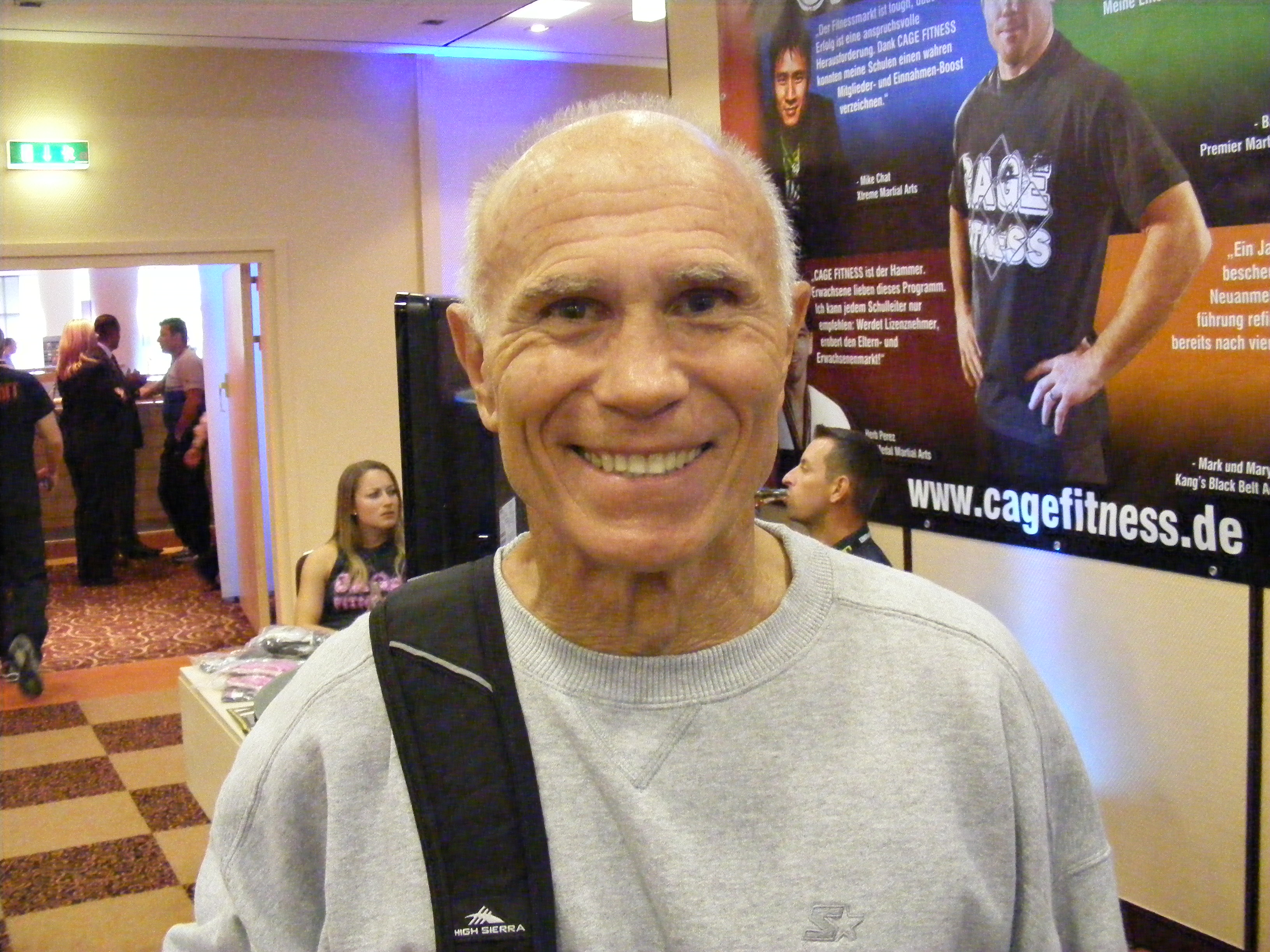
- Wallace in 2011
- Born: William Louis Wallace; December 1, 1945 (age 80); Portland, Indiana, U.S.
- Other names: Superfoot, Fast Billy, Bad Billy
- Nationality: United States
- Height: 5 ft 9 in (1.75 m)
- Weight: 165 lb (75 kg; 11.8 st)
- Style: Shōrin-ryū karate
- Stance: Orthodox
- Fighting out of: Daytona Beach, Florida
- Teacher: Michael Gneck
- Trainer: Jim "Ronin" Harrison
- Rank: 10th dan black belt Sōke (Shōrin-ryū)
- Years active: 1974–1990

Kickboxing record
- Total: 23
- Wins: 23
- By knockout: 13
- Losses: 0
- By knockout: 0
- Draws: 0

Other information
- Website: https://superfootsystem.com

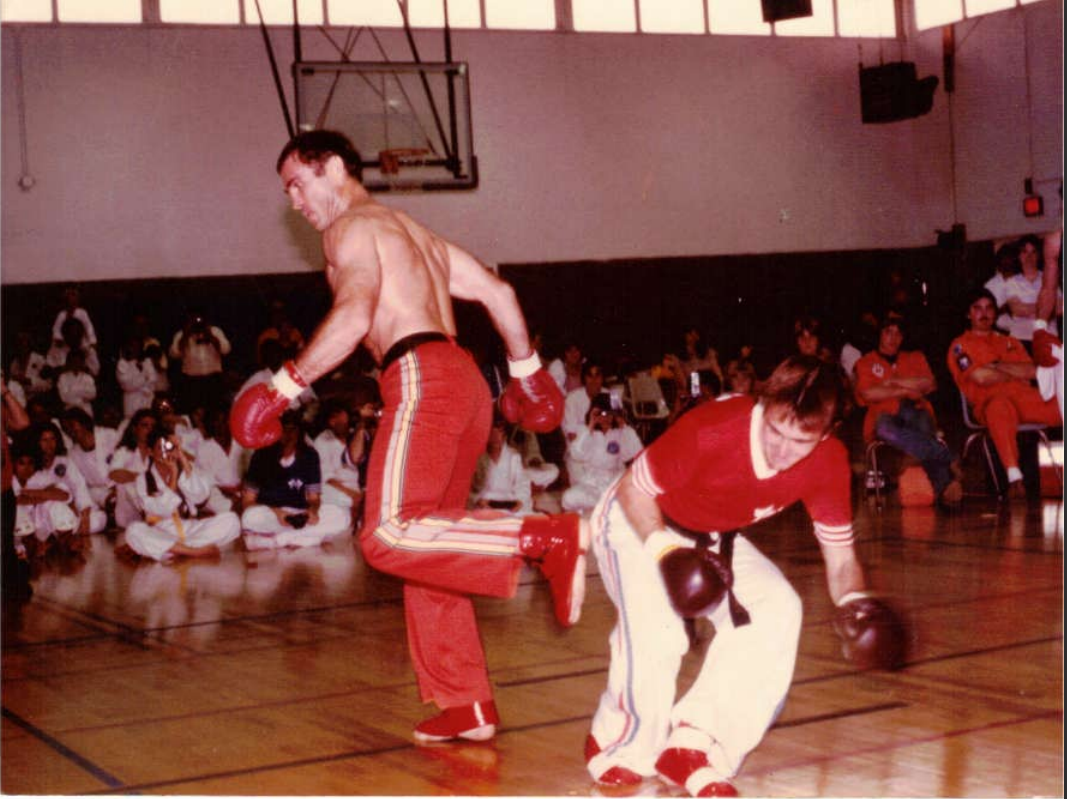
Bill Wallace Spars Greg Beaver in 1977

William Louis Wallace (born December 1, 1945), nicknamed "Superfoot", is an American martial artist, former professional kickboxer, and actor. Considered one of the first American superstars of kickboxing, he was the Professional Karate Association (PKA) World Full-Contact Champion, and the Middleweight Kickboxing Champion for six years, retiring with an undefeated 23–0–0 record. He was elected to Black Belt magazine's Hall of Fame in 1973 as "Tournament Karate Fighter of the Year" and again in 1978 as "Man of the Year". He is currently the International Ambassador for PKA Worldwide.

Wallace holds a 10th dan black belt and the title of sōke (grandmaster) in Shōrin-ryū karate. He has also studied wrestling and judo. He is the founder of The Superfoot System, which incorporates a stretching methodology with Wallace's kicking style and fighting approach. As an actor, his films include A Force of One (1979) with Chuck Norris, Killpoint (1984) with Cameron Mitchell, Ninja Turf (1985) with Phillip Rhee, and The Protector (1985) with Jackie Chan. Wallace also served as a commentator at some of the early Ultimate Fighting Championship (UFC) tournaments.

== Biography ==
Wallace was born in Portland, Indiana. He is of Scottish ancestry, and he trained in Wrestling during his high school years. He began his study of Judo in 1966 and was forced to discontinue his Judo related activities because of an injury he suffered to his right knee during practice. He then began to study Shōrin-ryū Karate under Michael Gneck in February 1967 while serving in the U.S. Air Force. After entering the point fighting tournament scene and achieving success there, he switched to full-contact competition. Wallace studied at Ball State University, earning a bachelor's degree in 1971 in physical education. In 1976, he earned a master's degree in kinesiology from Memphis State University.

With the coaching help of veteran fighter Jim 'Ronin' Harrison, Wallace won 23 consecutive professional fights between 1974 and 1980, becoming the Professional Karate Association middleweight world full-contact karate champion and retiring undefeated. Due to his Shōrin-ryū style, Wallace adopted a bladed, or sideways, stance with his lead arm held low in a manner similar to crab style boxers. He was known for his fast left leg kicks, especially his roundhouse kick and his hook kick, which was clocked at about 60 mph. He focused on his left leg because of the Judo-related injury to his right knee, using the right leg primarily as a base. He further refined his fighting style, adopting boxing techniques from trainer Joe Hadley. He also was kicked in the groin during a point fighting tournament and suffered the loss of one testicle.

A year later, Wallace turned professional and captured the PKA middleweight karate championship with a second-round knockout. He relinquished the crown in 1980, undefeated. The PKA promoted the sport of full-contact karate. Full-contact karate differed from kickboxing in that leg kicks were allowed in kickboxing and forbidden in full-contact karate. It was PKA President, Don Quine, who coined the phrase "Superfoot" to describe Wallace after witnessing his fight first with Mark Georgantas and then with Jem Echollas.

Bill Wallace was a personal trainer and close friend of both Elvis Presley and John Belushi. On March 5, 1982, Bill Wallace found John Belushi dead of a cocaine and heroin overdose in his room in Bungalow 3 at the Chateau Marmont on Sunset Boulevard in Hollywood, California.

In 1990, Bill Wallace (166 lbs.) fought one last exhibition kickboxing/karate match with friend Joe Lewis (198 lbs.) on pay per view. Both Wallace and Lewis were refused a boxing license because of their age. The exhibition ended with one judge in favor of Wallace and the other two judges scored the bout a tie; ending the exhibition in a draw.

== Accomplishments ==
Wallace has taught karate, judo, wrestling, and weightlifting at Memphis State University. The author of a college textbook about karate and kinesiology, he continues to teach seminars across the United States and abroad. He has acted, most notably in A Force of One starring Chuck Norris. Wallace was the play-by-play commentator for the inaugural Ultimate Fighting Championship pay-per-view event UFC 1 in 1993 alongside fellow kickboxer Kathy Long and NFL Hall of Fame player Jim Brown.

Wallace administers an organization of karate schools under his "Superfoot" system. He was elected to Black Belt Magazine's Hall of Fame in 1973 as "Tournament Karate Fighter of the Year" and again in 1978 as "Man of the Year." His film credits include A Force of One with Chuck Norris; Killpoint, with Cameron Mitchell; Continental Divide and Neighbors, with John Belushi; The Protector, with Jackie Chan; Los Bravos with Hector Echavarria; A Prayer for the Dying, with Mickey Rourke; Ninja Turf; and Sword of Heaven.

== Kickboxing record ==
Full-contact karate record
23 wins (12 KOs), 0 losses, 0 draw
Date	Result	Opponent	Event	Location	Method	Round	Time	Record	Notes
June 8, 1980	Win	(United States) Robert Biggs		Anderson, Indiana, USA	Decision	12	2:00	20–0	Defends PKA Middleweight World title.
May 24, 1980	Win	(United States) Tony Georgiades		Denver, Colorado, USA	KO	2		19–0	
March 1, 1980	Win	(United States) Raymond McCallum		Oklahoma City, Oklahoma, USA	Decision	5	2:00	18–0	
February 2, 1980	Win	(United States) Steve Mackey		West Palm Beach, Florida, USA	Decision	5	2:00	17–0	
July 18, 1978	Win	(United States) Daryl Tyler		Monte Carlo, Monaco	TKO	6		16–0	Defends PKA Middleweight World title.
June 5, 1978	Win	(Canada) Ralph Hollett		Halifax, Nova Scotia, Canada	Decision	7	2:00	15–0	
April 8, 1978	Win	(United States) Glen Mehlmen		Miami, Florida, USA	Decision	7	2:00	14–0	
March 11, 1978	Win	(United States) Emilio Narvaez		Providence, Rhode Island, USA	Decision	9	2:00	13–0	Defends PKA Middleweight World title.
November 28, 1977	Win	(United States) Burnis White		Honolulu, Hawaii, USA	Decision	9	2:00	12–0	Defends PKA Middleweight World title.
October 8, 1977	Win	(United States) Pat Worley		Indianapolis, Indiana, USA	KO	2		11–0	Defends PKA Middleweight World title.
September 10, 1977	Win	(United States) Herbie Thompson		Miami, Florida, USA	TKO	2		10–0	
May 21, 1977	Win	(United States) Ron Thivierge		Providence, Rhode Island, USA	TKO	6		9–0	Defends PKA Middleweight World title.
April 23, 1977	Win	(United States) Blinky Rodriguez		Las Vegas, Nevada, USA	Decision	9	2:00	8–0	Defends PKA Middleweight World title.
October 1, 1976	Win	(United States) Gary Edens		Los Angeles, California, USA	Decision	9	2:00	7–0	Defends PKA Middleweight World title.
May 29, 1976	Win	(Canada) Daniel Richer		Toronto, Ontario, Canada	TKO	3		6–0	Defends PKA Middleweight World title.
April 26, 1976	Win	(West Germany) Dieter Herdel		Paris, France	KO (hook kick)	1	0:44	5–0	
March 13, 1976	Win	(United States) Jem Echollas		Las Vegas, Nevada, USA	KO	2		4–0	Defends PKA Middleweight World title.
May 3, 1975	Win	(United States) Joe Corley		Atlanta, Georgia, USA	TKO	9	1:31	3–0	Defends PKA Middleweight World title.
September 14, 1974	Win	(Canada) Daniel Richer		Los Angeles, California, USA	Decision	3	2:00	2–0	Wins PKA Middleweight World title.
September 14, 1974	Win	(West Germany) Bernd Grothe		Los Angeles, California, USA	TKO	3		1–0	
Legend: Win Loss Draw/No contest

== Bibliography ==
- The Best of Bill Wallace (2005, Black Belt Communications; ISBN 978-089-750-146-0)
- Competitive Karate: Featuring the Superfoot System (2024, Human Kinetics; ISBN 978-073-604-492-9)
- The Ultimate Kick (1987, Unique Publications; ISBN 978-086-568-088-3)
- Dynamic Kicking & Stretching (1981, Unique Publications; ISBN 978-086-568-018-0)
- Karate: Basic Concepts & Skills (1976, Addison-Wesley Publishing Company; ISBN 978-020-106-837-5)

== Filmography ==
Year	Title	Role
1979	A Force of One	Jerry Sparks
1981	Sword of Heaven	Butch
1984	Killpoint	Sparring Partner
1985	L.A. Streetfighters	Kruger
1985	Manchurian Avenger	"Kamikaze"
1985	The Protector	Benny Garucci
1987	Get a Job	(Voice)
1987	Fight to Win	Tankson
1988	Silent Assassins	Colonel
1989	American Hunter	Adam
2001	Walker, Texas Ranger	Himself
2001	Los Bravos	Bill
2016	Enter the Cage	Bill
2019	The Last Operative	Bill
