= STAR System World Kickboxing Ratings =

Premier rating service for international kickboxing

Standardized Tournaments And Ratings System
- Abbreviation: STAR
- Founded: 1980
- Dissolved: 1989
- Region served: Worldwide
- Website: http://www.starsystemkickboxing.net

The Standardized Tournaments And Ratings System (STAR) was the premier rating service for international kickboxing, from 1980 through 1989, as syndicated in fifteen martial arts and sports magazines throughout the world. It was recognized as the official ratings source by two out of three major sanctioning bodies for professional kickboxing, World Kickboxing Association (WKA) and Karate International Council of Kickboxing (KICK).

The STAR ratings helped internationalize the sport by encouraging transnational matchmaking, and by enabling free agent champions such as: Don "The Dragon" Wilson, Benny "The Jet" Urquidez, Rob Kaman, Stan "The Man" Longinidis, Dennis Alexio, Maurice Smith, Peter "Sugarfoot" Cunningham, Fred Royers, James Warring, Graciela Casillas and Lucia Rijker.

STAR relied on a statistical technique adapted from international tournament chess competition. Competitors were ranked according to actual fight outcomes from rated contender bouts as opposed to the traditional opinion-of-the-judges approach. Rated contenders were considered the “standard” for world class competition. An unrated competitor had to defeat a top contender to move into the top ten ratings.

STAR documented nearly a decade of major kickboxing fight outcomes, frequently archived the official WKA and KICK scorecards from important events, identified undisputed world champions, and reconstructed the complete ring records of major champions. More than 250 live ring observers – including sports reporters, officials, managers, trainers and competitors – reported fight outcomes to the STAR System from around the world. Double-sourced corroboration was required for fight results reported from unofficial ring observers.

== Rated competition ==
Kickboxing contests included in the STAR ratings and kickboxing records featured paid professional competitors who fought for a knockout or multi-judge decision with kicks and punches, over timed rounds with rest periods, where strike-and-hold techniques were prohibited and round judging followed the international standard of overall effectiveness.

Muay Thai, point karate, boxing, wrestling and amateur kickboxing were regarded as separate sports. Mixed martial arts did not yet exist. Outcomes from these sports had no impact on the STAR ratings.

== History ==
The STAR ratings began in early 1980 as part of a coordinated initiative by "Inside Kung-Fu" editor Paul Maslak, with newsstand rival "Karate Illustrated" editor Renardo Barden, to minimize injuries on the nation’s weekend tournament karate circuit. With the help of John Corcoran, a former PKA events coordinator and editor of "Inside Kung-Fu"’s sister magazine "KICK Illustrated", the STAR ratings expanded into professional kickboxing to pressure the sport’s major sanctioning bodies to rank world contenders fairly, rather than to protect favored champions or to punish less favored contenders.

The STAR ratings in concert with the KI ratings encouraged tournament promoters to require safety equipment (hand and foot pads). If a tournament did not require safety equipment, their tournaments were not rated. Ed Parker agreed with these conditions, and the entire martial arts community in the United States followed suit. The STAR ratings were administrated by Paul Maslak throughout its existence.

STAR discontinued its tournament ratings at the end of 1981 and dissolved as an organization in 1989 before the start of the mixed martial arts movement.

== See also ==
- World Kickboxing Association (WKA)
- Karate International Council of Kickboxing (KICK)
