= Professional Karate Association =

Martial arts promotion company

Professional Kickboxing Association Worldwide
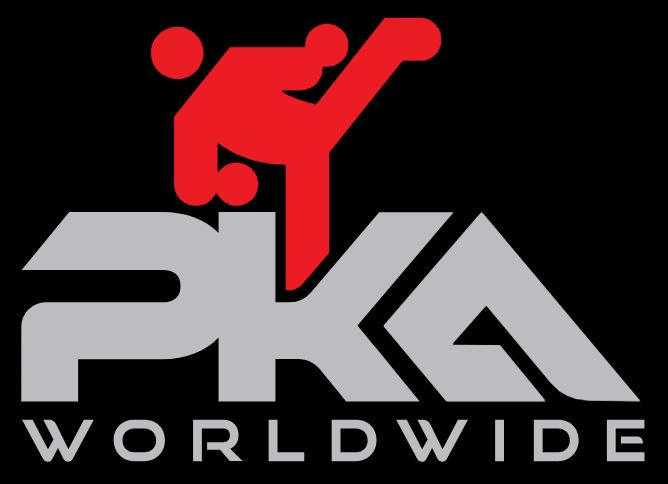
- Type: Martial Arts Organization
- Industry: Karate & Kickboxing
- Founded: 1974
- Founder: Don Quine, Judy Quine, Mike Anderson, Mike Haig (UK)
- Headquarters: United States
- Area served: Worldwide
- Key people: Don Quine, Judy Quine, Joe Corley, Jeff Smith, Bill Wallace, Joe Lewis, Rich Rose, Howard Dolgon, Jerry Piddington
- Services: Organization of karate and kickboxing professionals and promoters
- Owner: Joe Corley
- Website: PKA Worldwide Website

The Professional Karate Association (PKA), later Professional Karate & Kickboxing Association, and now effective from March 1, 2022 PKA Worldwide was originally a martial arts sanctioning organization, now transformed into a martial arts promotion company.

Through the 1970s, the PKA was the largest and most successful professional kickboxing organization in the United States and in the UK and much of Europe, featuring such fighters as Bill "Superfoot" Wallace, Joe Lewis, Benny "the Jet" Urquidez, The Iceman Jean-Yves Thériault, Dennis "the Terminator" Alexio, Rick "the Jet" Roufus, Jerry Trimble and Jeff Smith.

The original design of the PKA logo is a silhouette of Bill "Superfoot" Wallace performing a roundhouse kick.

The PKA introduced Kickboxing to the world when it originated in the 1970s and was brought to prominence in September 1974, when the Professional Karate Association (PKA) held the first World Championships. American Kickboxing was first known as Full Contact Karate before becoming known or referred to as Kickboxing as it amalgamates Karate & Boxing and aspects of various other Martial Arts into one sport. The pro full-contact version of karate is akin to boxing in that the fighters wear boxing gloves within a roped ring. Its resemblance to pure karate is that the fighters wear pads on their feet and must deliver a minimum of eight above-the-waist kicks in each two-minute round.

== History ==
Following the disintegration of the United States Kickboxing Association in 1972, the Professional Karate Association was formed in 1974 by Don and Judy Quine in association with Mike Anderson, going on to champion Kickboxing to the world stage to major success. It was launched with the initial world championships in 1974 at the Los Angeles Sports Arena, and was telecast on ABC's Wide World of Entertainment. The winners of the initial championship were Joe Lewis (heavyweight), Jeff Smith (light heavyweight), Bill "Superfoot" Wallace (middleweight), and Isiasis Duenas (lightweight). Additionally, Vernon "Thunder Kick" Mason would become US PKA's first bantamweight champion after winning via a KO victory over Sonny Onowa.

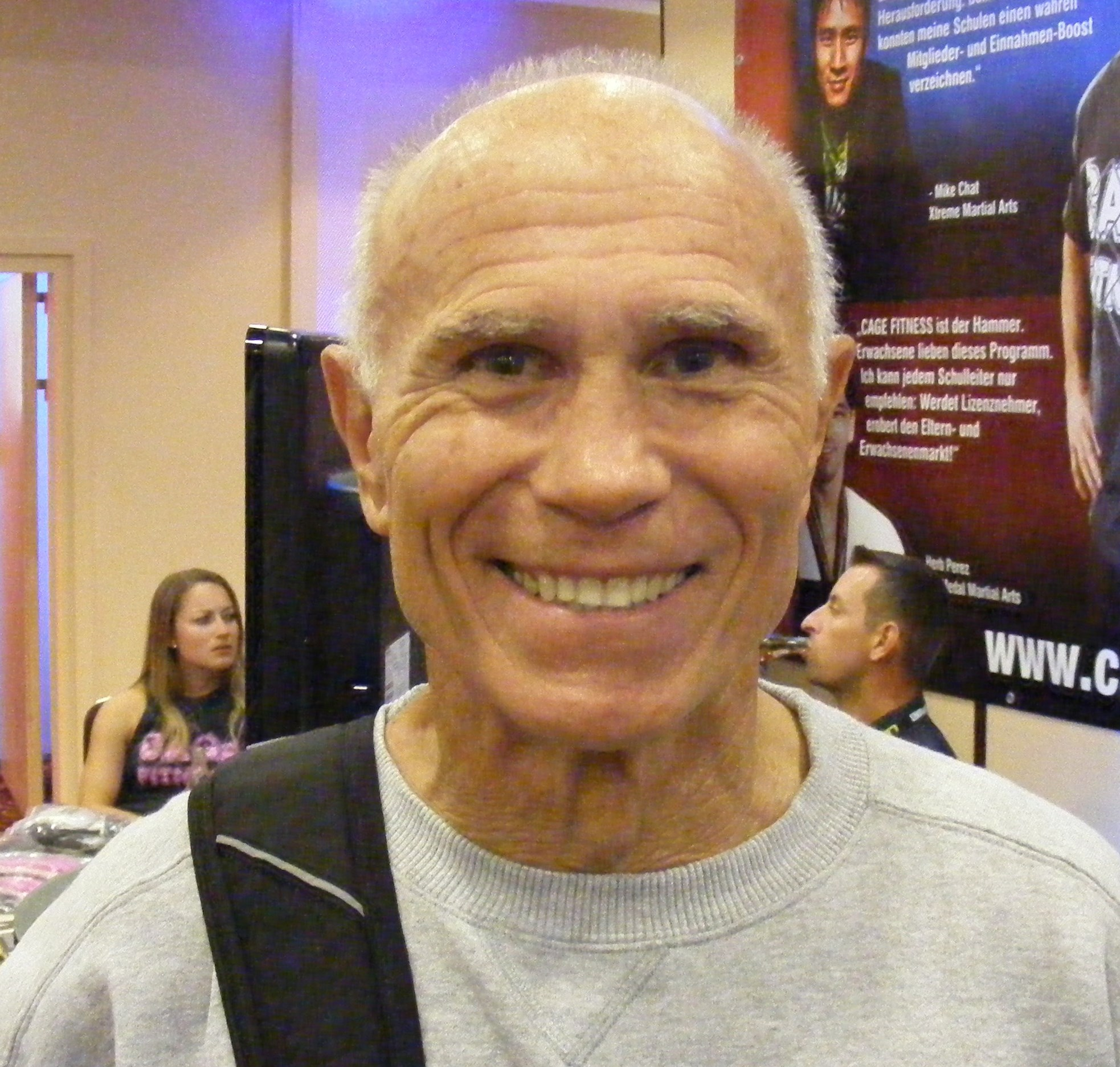
Bill "Superfoot" Wallace, PKA middleweight World Champion who later retired undefeated.

Joe Corley joined the PKA in 1977 and together with Glenn Keeney, Jerry Piddington, John Therien in Canada, George Sfetas in England and many others in the US organized the committees that would control the sport of full contact karate for the next nine years. The PKA went on to have a long term relationship with ESPN that lasted until 1986, while also airing a series of fights on CBS under the watch of CBS Sports VP Barry Frank and on NBC via Sean McManus. The PKA was by far the most visible sanctioning body for what became better known as kickboxing in the United States, in 1982 sanctioning 43% of events worldwide. and producing more than 1,000 hours of television content.

The PKA signed many fighters to exclusive contracts in order to build its brand in the sport. Some fighters chose to go to other competing organizations, but the PKA was the most well-known. The PKA sanctioned fights exclusively with what has become known as "full contact rules" which permit kicks only above the waist as opposed to the "international rules" advocated by other organizations. In 1989 Joe Corley gained the rights to PKA in an out-of-court settlement ending a 3-year dispute with his PKA partners. The PKA has since operated as a promotion company.

During the disputes happening within the PKA leadership at the time, two new Kickboxing associations were formed, this being the Professional Karate Commission (PKC) and the International Sport Karate Association (ISKA). The PKA however continued operations in America and parts of Europe including the United Kingdom.

The PKA hosted fights with Showtime through the 90s and held its first pay-per-view event with Showtime featuring Jean Yves Theriault vs Rick Roufus, Dennis Alexio vs Dick Kimber and Paul Vizzio vs Juan Torres, but went dormant shortly thereafter. PKA President Joe Corley said in a 2022 interview in the newly published PKA Worldwide magazine that "an inadvertent series of decisions by a broadcast executive wreaked unparalleled havoc on the momentum we had built for 20 years, and quite frankly, I had to take a hiatus following the 2 decades of gruelling yet exciting and inspiring television and promotion work. I put my personal energy into our Joe Corley American Karate studios in Atlanta, training our instructors how to operate professional studios as the interest in Martial Arts continued to explode."

== PKA Hall of Fame ==
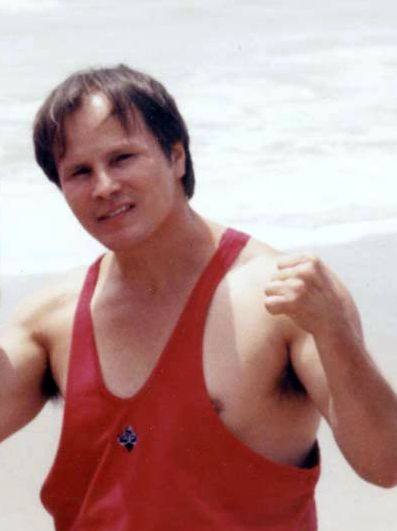
Benny "The Jet" Urquidez, PKA lightweight World Champion

Most notable historical legacy fighters of the PKA include:

- Benny "the Jet" Urquidez
- Bill "Superfoot" Wallace
- Joe Lewis
- Ho-Sung Pak (Notable for motion capture for Liu Kang as well as various other fighters from Mortal Kombat franchise)
- "The Iceman" Jean-Yves Thériault
- Dennis "the Terminator" Alexio
- Rick "the Jet" Roufus
- Jerry Trimble
- Jeff Smith
- Scott Adkins (actor, PKA Kickboxing instructor in the United Kingdom)
- Brad Hefton

== Relaunching ==
In March, 2022, PKA CEO Joe Corley announced the re-launch of PKA as PKA Worldwide. As of October 31, 2022, PKA Worldwide had named members of its PKA Worldwide Leadership Team to include 3 Co-Presidents led by Jeff Smith. Joe Corley announced that PKA Worldwide was undertaking its "hunt for the greatest strikers on the planet", and as of June 1, 2024 has held auditions in New York, Fort Worth, Redlands, California, Arlington, Texas South Hill, Washington, Vitoria Brazil and Johannesburg, South Africa. As of June, 2024 PKA Worldwide has a Global Leadership team in place that includes Robert Gutkowski as Vice Chairman / President of the Broadcast Division and Jeff Smith as President of Sports Operations. Carlos Silva has been named PKA Director for Latin America, Joe Viljoen named PKA Director for Africa and Amir Mosadegh is the PKA Director for Asia.

PKA CEO Joe Corley said "Many of the analysts of the Combat Sports on television have recognized that the Striking Techniques in kickboxing and in Mixed Martial Arts (MMA) are most appreciated by the sports' fans. The remarkable growth of MMA and other combat sports for the past 20 years has convinced us that now is the perfect time to re-introduce professional kickboxing to fill a niche in the combat sports landscape," said Corley. "The exciting striking aspect of kickboxing gives fans the elements of the sport they most want to watch – punching and kicking."

Following on from this, the new motto and mantra of the PKA is "Punch. Kick. Repeat." As Joe Corley PKA CEO said "It's what our fighters do best."

According to PKA Worldwide, the organization planned to relaunch PKA Kickboxing events in 2024 under a rebranded format featuring bouts held in a “Strikers Cage” rather than a traditional boxing ring. The organization stated that it had recruited more than 50 athletes following a two-year scouting process and had finalized the cage design, secured venues, and arranged broadcast and streaming agreements.

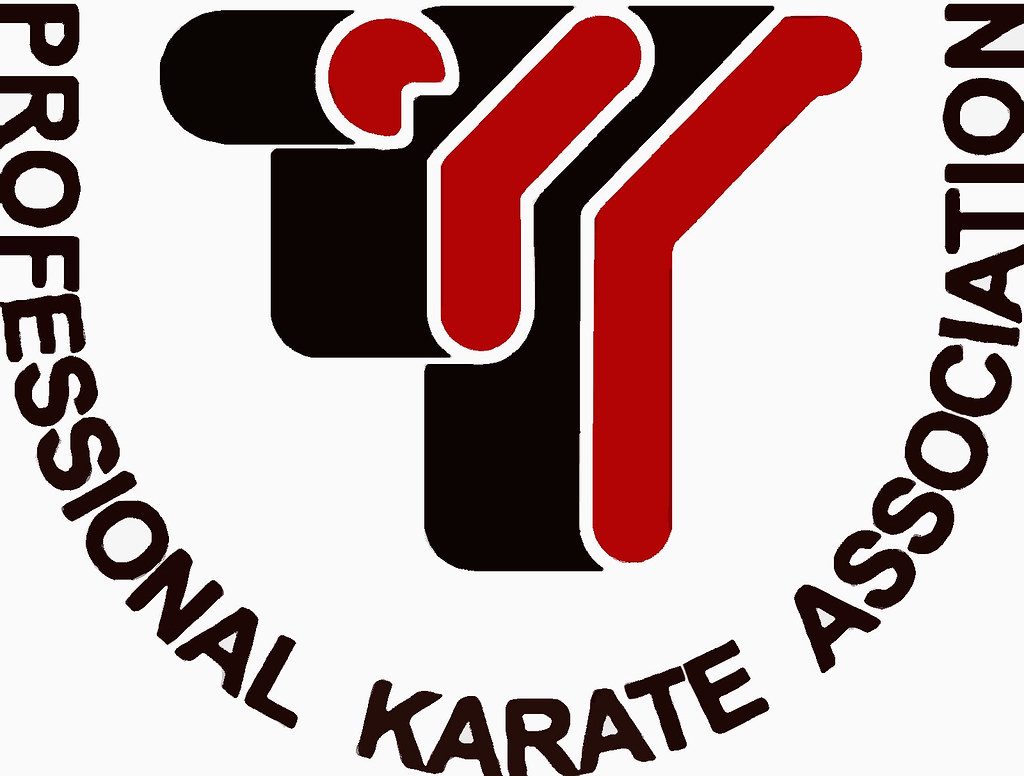
Professional Karate Association original logo from PKA 1974

PKA Worldwide Leadership Team

- Joe Corley - CEO Chief Executive Officer
- Robert Gutkowski - Vice Chairman, President, Broadcast Division
- Jeff Smith - Co-President, Sports Operations
- James Thomas II - Co-President, Business Affairs
- Bill Wallace - PKA International Ambassador
- Greg Suther - Director of PKA Associated Schools
- Daisy Lang - Global Ambassador, Women Fighters
- Amir Mosadegh - Director, PKA Asia
- Joe Viljoen - Director, PKA Africa
- Carlos Silva - Director, PKA South America
- Dan Stell - Director of Officials, Training & Certification
- Jamie Cashion - Event Coordinator Director
- Derrick Huff - CCO Chief Creative Officer

== List of world champions ==
The list includes full contact world title holders. Title defenses are not included.

=== Super Heavyweight ===
- Anthony Elmore - 1983-04 defeated Demetrius Edwards
- Tony Palmore - 1984-10-13 Still champion as of 87-08-16.
- Fred Floyd -1995-09-02 Billed as champion for a match against Kimo Leopoldo

=== Heavyweight ===
- Joe Lewis - 1974-09-14 Defeats Franc Brodar in tournament final to become first champion; also recognized as STAR champion; stripped of the title in 75-07 due to contract disputes.
- Teddy Limoz - 1975-08-26 defeated Lewis on 75-07-26 as a part of a tournament and in 1976-08-28 Defeats Mike Arroyo; possibly stripped of the title in 77-04 for refusing to sign an exclusive contract with PKA.
- Ross Scott - 1977-04-23 Defeats Everett Eddy
- Demetrius Edwards - 1980-08-12 also recognized as STAR champion; loses to WAKO champion Tony Palmore on 1980-10-16 in Miami, FL, USA (The Miami Herald, 80-10-17) but continues to be recognized by PKA.
- Anthony Elmore - 1982-05-29
- Brad Hefton - 1983-05-13 Defeats Tom Hall
- Jerry Rhome -1986-04-26

=== Light Heavyweight ===
- Jeff Smith - 1974-09-14 Defeats Wally Slocki in tournament final to become first champion.
- Dan Macaruso - 1980-01-10
- Kerry Roop - 1982-06
- Emilio Narvez - 1983-03-25 Defeats Matt Lawrence; still champion as of 84-07-09; vacant in 84.
- Dennis Alexio - 1984-09-14 Defeats Rob Salazar; still champion as of 85-12-14; most likely vacates the title in 87 to move up to the cruiserweight division.

=== Middleweight ===
- Bill Wallace - 1974-09-14 Defeats Daniel Richer in tournament final to become first champion; vacates in 80-06 upon retirement.
- Jean-Yves Thériault - 1980-11-15 Defeats Robert Biggs

=== Super welterweight ===
- Bob Thurman - 1982-04-02 Defeats Alvin Prouder to become the first champion; some reports say "light middleweight" title although the in-ring announcement and broadcasting team say the match is for the super welterweight title; still champion as of 86-04-21
- David Humphries - 1987

=== Welterweight ===
- Eddie Andujar - 1977-05-21 Defeats Tom Bocalaccos.
- Earnest Hart Jr. - 1977-10-08
- Bob Ryan - 1978-03-11
- Steve Shepherd - 1978-07-22
- Earnest Hart Jr. [2] - 1978-11-30
- Steve Shepherd [2] -1979-10-19

Vacant in 81-01.

- Earnest Hart Jr. [3] - 1981-04-18 Defeats Jeff Gripper.
- Jeff Gripper - 1981-10-10
- Alvin Prouder - 1982-07-24
- Johnny Davis - 1985-02-02
- Ricky Haynes - 1985-05-11
- Alvin Prouder [2] - 1985-11-02 Still champion as of 86-02-14.

=== Light welterweight ===
- Tommy Williams - 1982-04-03 United States lightweight champion, defeats California state champion Tony Avalos for the vacant world title; billed as world super welterweight title on local paper (The Daily Oklahoman, 82-04-03 -04-07 & 04/27); the match is aired on ESPN only as the U.S. title defense from "Culver City, CA"; still champion as of 83-08-24.
- Cliff Thomas - 1984-04-06 Also holds the Lightweight Title; vacates the Light Welterweight Title on 84-04-08 due to a PKA rule preventing a competitor from holding multiple titles.
- Leroy Taylor - 1984-06-14 Defeats Leo Loucks.
- Jerry Trimble - 1986-04-26

=== Super Light Weight ===
- Gordon Franks - 1975 defeats Ramiro Guzman
- Cliff Thomas - 1980
- Paul Vizzio - 1981

=== Light weight ===
- Isaias Duenas - 1974-09-14 Defeats Ramon Smith in tournament final .
- Benny Urquidez - 1976-08-28

Defeats Earnest Hart Jr. for the vacant lightweight title

- Cliff Thomas 1982-08-14 Defeats Norris Williams.
- Tony Rosser 1983-03-22
- Cliff Thomas [2] 1983-08-27
- Leo Loucks 1986-02-02

=== Featherweight ===
- Paul Vizzio - 1983 Has held the Super Lightweight Title since 81-11-13; billed as the featherweight champion from 83-03; still champion as of 85-07-15; temporarily retires in 86

=== Bantamweight ===
- Vernon Mason - 1979-08-25 - Defeats Sonny Onawa to become the first champion.
- Larry Sanders - 1980-05-17
- Felipe Garcia - 1980 defeated Edmund Ardissone in 80-01 still champion as of 85-07-15; continues to be recognized as champion by ISKA upon its inception in 86-07.

=== Flyweight ===
- Leonard Galiza - 1977
- Jerry Clarke - 1985-07-15
- Carl Sklavos - 1987-03-20

== See also ==
- Martin T. Buell – former commissioner of the PKA
