= World Kickboxing Association =

International sport governing body

WKA International
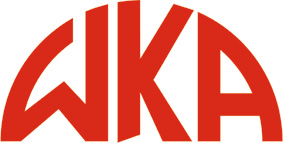
- Abbreviation: WKA
- Formation: October 1976
- Headquarters: United States
- Region served: Worldwide
- Members: National associations
- Official language: English
- President: Dave Sawyer
- Website: https://wkainternational.com
- Remarks: WKA was split from Professional Karate Association (PKA) in 1976

WKA International (formally known as World Kickboxing Association or World Kickboxing and Karate Association) is an international kickboxing organization. The WKA sanctions bouts worldwide that are governed by its regulations.

== History ==
In 1976, WKA International was founded by Howard Hanson in the United States and originally named World Karate Association. The organization was the first non-profit governing body to use an independently controlled rating list and the first to establish a world championship division for women and the first to include countries from Asia. The organization secured network broadcast in the US and Japan and became a major sanctioning body for professional karate. Early stars of the WKA included Benny Urquidez, Don "The Dragon" Wilson, Kevin Rosier and Graciela Casillas. According to martial arts author John Ritschel, "The WKA became successful by finding common ground between Western and Eastern full-contact fighting culture, thereby creating and defining a culture for the sport that improved the recognition of full-contact competitions."

The WKA reported that it had had 52 of its events in televised syndication worldwide in 1981, compared to 48 events broadcast by rival federation PKA (the Professional Karate Association) that year.

Although PKA and WKA tried to expand their promotional presence in Europe, their success was limited. In contrast to the U.S., the development of full-contact karate (kickboxing) in Europe has been more significantly influenced by nationalism and governmental interference than by the pursuit of television revenues. Nevertheless, by 1982, European organizations had sanctioned approximately 20% of all events worldwide.

The WKA later developed on the European continent with Champions like Rob Kaman and Fred Royers. In 1991, Howard Hanson sold the WKA to Canadian Dale Floyd which was followed by a fade in the organization's North American activities, only having tournament champions such as Tony LoCoco. In 1994, Paul Ingram took over the WKA and established its world headquarters in the UK, which led the appointed European directors Fred Royers from Holland and Jean-Paul Maillet from France to leave in January. At the time, WKA was the second largest professional sanctioning organisation in the World. By 2011, the WKA had 129 offices worldwide and was the best known governing body among the rival federations in kickboxing. In 2013, it had 40 member nations.

Howard Hanson founded and lead the association from 1976 to 1992.

Dale Floyd lead the association from 1992 to 1994

Paul Ingram 1994 to 2006

Klaus Nonnemacher 2006 to 2012 Then became WKU

WKU split

In 2012, the manager of the WKA split away to form World Kickboxing and Karate Union (WKU), sponsors such as KWON, which formerly supported the WKA, also moved to the WKU.

From 29 September 2012 WKA had new management: Michele Panfietti began serving as World President and Cristiano Radicchi began serving as General Secretary. From December 2016, the WKA headquarters was transferred back to Birmingham, England.

By 2018 under Paul Ingram the WKA suffered two failed attempts at hosting world championships, 2017 and 2018 in Spain both years senior members had to rescue by joining with ICO one year and Unifieds the following. WKA had not held a World Championships under its own name for 8 years.

== A new era of the WKA ==
In 2018, WKA International (New Zealand) acquired the rights associated with the organisation from former president Paul Ingram. Dave Sawyer subsequently assumed responsibility for the administration and development of WKA International.

During the following years, the organisation expanded its international representation and continued to hold events under the WKA name.

In 2024, members of WKA International agreed to establish a formal constitution governing the international association. The constitution was ratified in 2025, creating a member-based governance structure for the organisation. The organization accepted its first constitution on July 17, 2025.

As part of the restructuring, Sawyer agreed that the rights held by WKA International (New Zealand) would be transferred to the newly constituted international association.

WKA International subsequently continued under the leadership of Dave Sawyer as president. The organisation marked its 50th anniversary with plans for its World Championships to return to the United States..

WKA International sanctions fights worldwide fought under the WKA ruleset.

== Ruleset ==
Under its professional ruleset it sanctions boxing, full contact karate and kickboxing, low kick, K-1 and Glory kickboxing, as well as Thai boxing and Muay Thai.

Using substances banned by one of the appropriate organizations isn't allowed, WKA supervisors, promoters and the official medic can perform tests on the competitors. Failing a test, or failing to provide a sample can result in a two year ban. Tests are performed by a qualified person of the same sex.

Competitions are held inside of a ring not smaller than 20 square feet or larger than 24 square feet, with four ropes surrounding it. Referees judging the bouts must be certified by WKA.

Full contact karate fights consist of two twelve minute rounds for men, and two ten minute rounds for women. European and national title bouts consist of two ten minute rounds for men, and two eight minute rounds for women. All other regional and state fights consist of two eight minute rounds for men and two six minute rounds for women. For boxing and all forms of kickboxing and karate, rounds consist of three three minute rounds for Class B athletes or five three minute rounds for Class A athletes, depending on the experience of the competitors. Class B athletes are those with seven amateur wins. They are promoted to Class A after achieving eight Class B wins. There is always a minute of rest between rounds. Rounds are scored based on eight counts, effective striking, ring control and style specific techniques.

All competitors wear competition appropriate attire, with compulsory groin protectors for men and breast protectors for women, with both additionally having to use a mouth guard. Full contact karate athletes wear foot protectors, with the exception of title bouts, should the champion demand otherwise. 10 oz gloves are used in all divisions, unless fighters up to and including middleweight agree to use 8 oz gloves.

Bouts in which one of the fighters has missed weight are permitted, provided the weight differential doesn't exceed 3.5% of the weight division allowance or 3.5 kg, whichever is less.

Aside from this, WKA also certifies Karate and kickboxing colored belts and black belts, ranging from 1st to 9th Dan for kickboxing or 1st to 10th for Karate.

== Weight classes ==
Weight class name	Upper limit	Gender
Atomweight	46 kg (101.4 lb)	Female
Super Atomweight	48 kg (105.8 lb)	Female
Flyweight	50 kg (110.2 lb)	Female
Bantamweight	53.5 kg (117.9 lb)	Male / Female
Featherweight	57 kg (125.7 lb)	Male / Female
Lightweight	60 kg (132.3 lb)	Male / Female
Super Lightweight	63.5 kg (140.0 lb)	Male / Female
Welterweight	67 kg (147.7 lb)	Male / Female
Super Welterweight	70 kg (154.3 lb)	Male / Female
Middleweight	73 kg (160.9 lb)	Male / Female
Super Middleweight	76.5 kg (168.7 lb)	Male / Female
Light Heavyweight	80 kg (176.4 lb)	Male / Female
Junior Heavyweight	83 kg (183.0 lb)	Male
Cruiserweight	86.5 kg (190.7 lb)	Male
Super Cruiserweight	90 kg (198.4 lb)	Male
Heavyweight	95 kg (209.4 lb)	Male
Super Heavyweight	Unlimited	Male

== Full Contact World Champions ==
The list includes full contact world title holders. (title defenses are not included)

=== Super Heavyweight ===
- Stan Longinidis (Stan the Man) - 1993
- Duke Roufus - 1995
- Stuart Green - 2000 Defeats Sunday Abioundun
- Jean-Marc Girard - 2005 Defeats Hakan Senöz
- Sergej Maslobojev - 2007
- Anatoly Nosyrev - 2007 Defeats Matos Vitor
- Mike LaBree - 2012 Defeats Jordan Carroll; still champion as of 11-11; most likely vacant in or sometime before 18-12 when the management moves to NZL with the records "lost from years before" (WKA official website

=== Heavyweight ===
- Gary Sandland - 1993 Defeats William Van Roosmalen.
- Tony Tasker - 1994
- Steffano Tomiazzo - 1995
- Marek Piotrowski - 1995
- Stuart Green - 1997 Defeats Grant Barker
- Erdal Yildrim - 2003
- Jean-Marc Girard - 2005
- Andre Mewis - 2007
- Florian Pavic - 2010 Defeats Patrik Berger; retires in 12 (sometime after 12-05-18).

=== Super Cruiserweight ===
- Franz Haller - 2002
- Uros Repas - 2006
- Florian Pavic - 2009 Defeats Hichem Medoukali; retires in 12 (sometime after 12-05-18).

=== Cruiserweight ===
- Tony LoCoco - 1994
- Pavlica Steko - 2002
- Blerim Rashiti - 2007
- Gareth Richards - 2010 Defeats José De La Llera; vacant in 16.
- Amer Abdallah - 2016 Defeats Daniel Hughes; announces his retirement in 18-10.

=== Super Light Heavyweight ===
- Rob Kaman - 1992 Defeats Mark Russell; defeats ISKA world super middleweight champion Jean-Yves Thériault on 92-06-20 in Paris, FRA in a double title match but is forced to vacate the title for exceeding the weight limit.
- Mladen Steko - 2002
- Herbert Danois - 2007 Defeats Albert Krieziu
- Marlon Hunt - 2010 Defeats Robert Cassells

=== Light Heavyweight ===
- Bruce Ozbek - 2002
- Marc Apele - 2005 Defeats Orhan Celik.
- Jens Lintow - 2006
- Dominik Haselbeck - 2007 Defeats Angel Alvarez.
- Ramin Abtin - 2007
- Mariusz Niziolek - 2009
- Tarik Kuzucu - 2009 Defeats Richard Pedro.
- Mukhtar Khizriev - 2011
- Gareth Richards - 2011 NZL with the records "lost from years before" (WKA official website).
- Ryan Lyall - 2021 Defeats Adil Zerhoui; vacates on the same day upon retirement.

=== Super Middleweight ===
• Dale Cook- 1995-1996

- Ramin Abtin - 2002
- Dominik Haselbeck - 2007 Defeats Geogi Iliev; still champion as of 11-10-20; most likely vacant in or sometime before 18-12 when the management moves to NZL with the records "lost from years before" (WKA official website).

=== Middleweight ===
- Arthur O'Loughlin - 1989 Defeats Terry Begue
- A.J. Verel - 1992
- Stan Peterec - 1994
- Perry Ubeda - 2002 Defeats Şahin Yakut
- Serguei Lapinski - 2002
- Dean Sugden - 2006
- Muzammal Nawaz - 2007
- Christopher Autrey - 2011 fastest knockout in WKO/WKA/K-1/Glory history at 7 sec.

Most knockouts in 1 year (11)

- Semen Poskotin Merkel - 2010 Defeats Przemyslaw Ziemnichki in full contact rules (legionisci.com, 10-05-24); still champion as of 12-12-07; most likely vacant in or sometime before 18-12 when the management moves to NZL with the records "lost from years before" (WKA official website).

=== Super Welterweight ===
- Kash Gill - 1991 Also wins ISKA freestyle light middleweight title on 93-11-21.
- Victor Vargotsky -1994 Defeats Luis Aguila
- Angelo DiBella - 1995
- Roberto Fatica - 1995
- Mark Weller - 1996
- Imed Mathlouthi - 2002
- Chris Algieri - 2005 Defeats Brad Fowler
- Viktor Hoffman - 2011
- Bobby Campbell - 2017

=== Welterweight ===
- Victor Vargotsky - 1994
- Murat Comert - 2002
- Jason Vassallo - 2007
- Dennis Lukashev - 2011

=== Super Lightweight ===
- Terry Butwell - 2002
- Alain Coppey - 2007 Defeats Christian Deiss
- Bobby Campbell - 2009 Defeats Christian Deiss.
- Sam Allan - 2013

=== Lightweight ===
• Bill Barton - 1993

- Juan Torres - 1994
- Muzaffer Tosun - 2002
- Rocco Cipriano - 2007
- Michael Peynaud - 2011 Still champion as of 2012-11-29; most likely vacant in or sometime before 18-12 when the management moves to NZL with the records "lost from years before" (WKA official website).

=== Super Featherweight ===
- Danny Melendez - 1990 Defeats Aldaberto Leal for KICK and WKA titles.
- Rocco Cipriano - 2004

=== Bantamweight ===
- Scott Allan - 2011

=== Women’s Super Lightweight ===
- Bianca Ammann - 2011

=== Women’s Lightweight ===
- Fredia Gibbs - 1992 Defeats Chevrette Pabros.
- Christine Theiss - 2007 Defeats Donatella Panu

=== Women’s Bantamweight ===
- Kaliope Yeitsidou - 2006
- Cindy Metz - 2011

=== Women’s Flyweight ===
- Rebekka Hermann - 2011

== See also ==
- List of kickboxing organizations
