= Ray McCallum (martial artist) =

American martial artist

Raymond McCallum
- Born: March 17, 1958; Dallas, Texas, United States
- Died: April 27, 2025 (aged 67)
- Nationality: (United States) American
- Division: Middleweight
- Style: Karate
- Rank: Black belt

Ray McCallum
Medal record

Representing United States

Semi-Contact Kickboxing

WAKO Amateur World Championships
Gold medal – first place	1981 Milan, Italy	–79 kg
Silver medal – second place	1983 London, England	–79 kg
Gold medal – first place	1985 London, England	–81 kg

Raymond Dale McCallum (March 17, 1958 – April 27, 2025) was an American karateka and kickboxer who competed in point karate and full-contact karate during the late 1970s and early 1980s. A five-time world champion, he was ranked among the top tournament fighters in the United States for much of his career and was named Black Belt magazine's Competitor of the Year in 1979.

== Early life ==
McCallum was born on March 17, 1958, in Dallas, Texas, to Thomas Harold McCallum and Maxine Case. He attended Bryan Adams High School in Dallas. At age 13, he began studying karate, initially under Demetrius Havanas, another top Texas competitor. The following year, at 15, he left school and home to travel and pursue his martial arts training—a quest that continued throughout his life.

== Career ==
McCallum's name first appeared in national martial arts publications in 1974, when Black Belt reported on the Southwest Karate Championships in Dallas, where he won the brown belt lightweight division. Later that year, competing as a brown belt, he won the brown belt lightweight division at the Mardi Gras National Championships in New Orleans. In 1976, now a black belt, he was runner-up in the heavyweight division and placed second in forms at Demetrius Havanas' Regional Karate Championships in Dallas.

By 1977, McCallum had become the top-rated light-contact black belt in the United States, compiling 20 straight tournament victories, including wins at the Houston Karate Olympics, the United States Karate Championships, and the Arlington Pro-Am. Louisiana instructor Rod Prejean said of him: "Ray McCallum has to be number one across the board in the Texas-Louisiana area. He has won everything in this region."

In 1979, McCallum took second place to Keith Vitali at the PKA Nationals in Los Angeles, and earlier that year won all his fights at the Ft. Worth Nationals but lost the grand championship to Steve Fisher on total points. That same year, he was named Black Belt magazine's Karate Competitor of the Year, a selection the magazine acknowledged as controversial given Vitali's victories that year.

McCallum won the Overall Grand Champion title at the Diamond Nationals twice: in 1980 and 1983. He was inducted into the Diamond Nationals Hall of Fame in 1990.

== Professional titles ==
In July 1980, McCallum captured the Professional Karate Association (PKA) United States Middleweight Championship (165 lb / 74.8 kg), defeating Glenn McMorris in July 1980. He lost the title to Rodney Batiste on March 14, 1981, in Minneapolis, Minnesota.

In March 1983, McCallum won the Karate International Council of Kickboxing (KICK) World Super Middleweight Title, defeating Gene McComb in Las Vegas, Nevada. He lost the title to John Moncayo on July 16, 1983, in New York.

== International championships ==
McCallum won five world championships across karate and kickboxing. At the W.A.K.O. World Championships in 1981 in Milan, Italy, he won gold in the –79 kg Semi-Contact division. At the 1983 W.A.K.O. World Championships in London, he won silver in the –79 kg Semi-Contact division. At the 1985 W.A.K.O. World Championships, also in London, he won gold in Full-Contact kickboxing (–81 kg) and bronze in Semi-Contact kickboxing (–79 kg).

He retired from full-contact competition with a record of 30–13–2.

== Fighting style and reputation ==
McCallum was known for his innovative and unpredictable fighting style, combining sweeps with follow-up punches. According to Keith Vitali, McCallum performed at least three techniques in major tournaments that no other fighter had ever attempted. His improvisational "freestyling" approach was controversial among traditionalists but popular with sport karate fans.

He cultivated a reputation as a Texas "outlaw," and his black belt certificate was never signed by his instructor—instead, he sought out instructors he respected to certify his skills.

== Controversies ==
McCallum's career was marked by several notable feuds. His rivalry with Alvin Prouder culminated at the 1982 Diamond Nationals in Minneapolis, where Prouder defeated McCallum in the middleweight finals. After the match, a physical altercation occurred between the two. Prouder's manager, Bernie Krasno, later wrote to Black Belt alleging that McCallum had used racial slurs against Prouder, a claim McCallum denied.

His feud with Steve "Nasty" Anderson began at a Pro-Am Championship in Fort Worth, Texas, when Anderson attempted to throw McCallum off the stage. A subsequent incident at a Dallas tournament involving fighter Freddie Brazil and his instructor Mike Hughes escalated into a riot that led to McCallum's suspension from the Amateur Organization of Karate (AOK) and his eventual retirement from tournament fighting.

== Recognition ==
In a 1987 Black Belt survey of the greatest tournament fighters of all time, 18 top competitors ranked the best fighters in history. McCallum appeared on multiple lists:

· Joe Corley placed McCallum at No. 6. · Keith Vitali placed him at No. 7, noting he was "rated number two many times." · John Longstreet placed him at No. 8, stating: "Ray McCallum—he is still young. By the time he is finished, he could be the best of all time." · Larry Carnahan placed him at No. 9, praising his "unpredictability and versatility." · Pat Worley placed him at No. 7, noting he "might be the most experienced since he has competed in point competition for a decade."

McCallum was inducted into the Diamond Nationals Hall of Fame in 1990.

== Personal life ==
McCallum was an avid motorcyclist who preferred riding his Harley-Davidson across the country over flying. He also enjoyed hiking, camping, hunting, skiing, and sailing.

== Death ==
Raymond McCallum died on April 27, 2025, at age 67. His funeral was held on May 5, 2025, at New Hope Funeral Home Chapel in Sunnyvale, Texas, with burial at Long Creek Cemetery.
