= Jean-Yves Thériault vs. Don Wilson =

- Date: December 18, 1984
- Venue: Verdun Auditorium in Montreal, Quebec, Canada
- Title(s) on the line: Non-title bout.

Tale of the tape
Boxer	(Canada) Jean-Yves Thériault	(United States) Don Wilson
Nickname	"The Iceman"	"The Dragon"
Hometown	Paquetville, New Brunswick, Canada	Cocoa Beach, Florida, USA
Pre-fight record	47-3	52-4-1-3
Height	5 ft 11 in (1.80 m)	6 ft 1 in (1.85 m)
Weight	175 lb (79 kg)	175 lb (79 kg)
Style	Kickboxing	Pai Lum Tao Kung Fu, Gōjū-ryū Karate, Kickboxing.
Recognition	PKA World Middleweight Champion	WKA World Super Light-Heavyweight Champion

Result
- Decision draw after 12 rounds

Jean-Yves Thériault vs. Don "The Dragon" Wilson was a middleweight kickboxing bout that took place in Montreal, Quebec, Canada on December 18, 1984, which ended in a decision draw.

== Background ==
Jean-Yves Thériault began his career in 1976 after six months of training and rose to prominence when he defeated Robert Biggs to win the PKA Middleweight Championship of the World in November 1980. He had accumulated a record of 47 wins and 3 losses by the time of the fight, mostly competing in his home country of Canada. His last lost was in November 1979 when he dropped a decision to Ralph Hollet.

Don "The Dragon" Wilson came from a kung fu (White Dragon Style) and karate (Goju Ryu) background and started his career fighting in his native Florida in 1974. After winning the Florida state and American titles, he took the WKA Light Heavyweight Championship of the World in October 1980 when he defeated Andy White by knockout. He defended the title six times before winning the KICK World Light Heavyweight title from Curtis Crandall and the WKA Cruiserweight World title from Maurice Smith in 1983.

Thériault and Wilson had been set to fight years earlier when Wilson defeated Rodney Batiste in July 1980 in an eliminator for the vacant PKA Middleweight title. The fight never materialised, however, due to a number of contractual and promotional issues, and Thériault faced Robert Biggs instead.

== The fight ==
The bout took place on December 18, 1984 at the Verdun Auditorium in Montreal, Quebec, Canada in front of 7,000 spectators, with the fight set for twelve, two-minute rounds under American kickboxing rules. Neither fighter put any of their titles on the line.

The fight went the distance and ended in a decision draw. Many believe Wilson to have been a clear winner, but Thériault was the one who registered the only knockdown of the fight.

== Aftermath ==
As arguably the biggest bout in the sport's history at the time, it was considered a disappointment with neither Thériault or Wilson emerging as kickboxing's best fighter. A rematch between the pair was discussed but never came to fruition.

Following the fight, Wilson said "I feel I won the bout, but not as convincing as I can. Next time we meet, I feel I can knock Thériault out. He's just not that tough." To which Thériault replied "Wilson fights on fear. He was able to stay out of trouble, but he did nothing to hurt me. I think he overrates himself. We'll see if he's so smug after the next fight".

In an interview with Black Belt, Wilson spoke about rematches, and expressed frustration at Thériault not agreeing to fight him again.
