= Don Wilson (kickboxer) =

American kickboxer (born 1954)

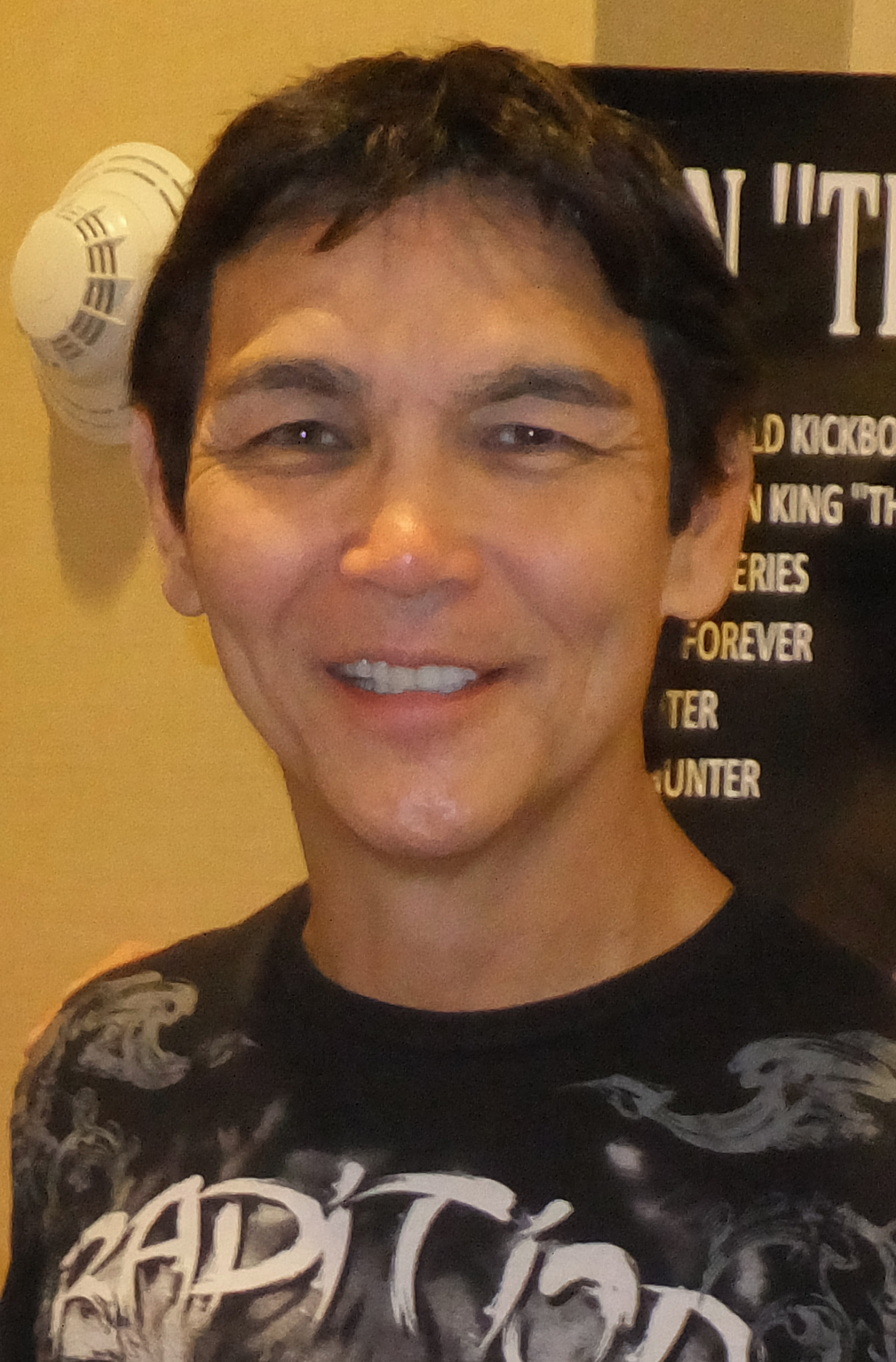
- Wilson in 2014
- Born: Donald Glen Wilson; September 10, 1954 (age 72); Alton, Illinois, U.S.
- Other names: The Dragon; Don Hoshino
- Height: 6 ft 0 in (1.83 m)
- Division: Light Heavyweight Cruiserweight
- Style: Kickboxing; Pai Lum White Dragon Kung-Fu; Gōjū-ryū Karate
- Fighting out of: Los Angeles, California, U.S.
- Teachers: Danny K. Pai; Fred Schmitz; Jim Wilson; Chuck Merriman
- Years active: 1974–1991, 1999–2002, 2013–Present

Professional boxing record
- Total: 9
- Wins: 6
- By knockout: 4
- Losses: 3
- By knockout: 3

Kickboxing record
- Total: 82
- Wins: 72
- By knockout: 48
- Losses: 5
- Draws: 2
- No contests: 3

Other information
- Notable relatives: Jim Wilson (brother), Kathleen Karridene (wife)
- Website: www.donthedragonwilson.com
- Boxing record from BoxRec

Japanese name
- Kanji: ドン 星野
- Hiragana: どん ほしの
- Katakana: ドン ホシノ

Donald Glen Wilson (born September 10, 1954), nicknamed "the Dragon", is an American former professional kickboxer, boxer, actor, and martial artist. An 11-time world champion who scored 47 knockouts in four decades, he has been called by the STAR System Ratings as "perhaps the greatest kickboxer in American history. He has disposed of more quality competition than anyone we've ever ranked". In 2015, he was inducted into the International Sports Hall of Fame.

Wilson was a fight commentator and interviewer in many of the early Ultimate Fighting Championship (UFC) events, beginning with UFC 7. As an actor, he is best known for starring in several B movie action films in the 1980s and 1990s, such as the Bloodfist series (from Bloodfist to Bloodfist VIII: Trained to Kill), the Ring of Fire series (from Ring of Fire to Ring of Fire III: Lion Strike), Red Sun Rising (1994), and the Cyber Tracker series (CyberTracker and CyberTracker 2).

== Early years and training ==
Wilson was born to a Japanese mother and American father in Alton, Illinois. He utilized his mother's maiden name, Hoshino (Japanese: 星野), as a ring name while competing in Japan. He attended Saint Andrew's School in Boca Raton, where he was an MVP in football and basketball. Wilson also tried his hand at wrestling, in which he excelled enough to score a 4th place in the Florida State Collegiate Wrestling competition.

After high school, Wilson was accepted into the Coast Guard Academy in New London, Connecticut in the fall of 1972. Wilson has stated that his brother challenged him to friendly sparring, which he imagined he would dominate since Wilson was more physically imposing and athletic than his brother. To his surprise, he was easily knocked around by his brother's martial arts ability. He credits this experience for making a believer out of him, after which he would pursue martial arts. He began studying Gōjū-ryū karate with Chuck Merriman for two hours a week for one year.

In 1973, Wilson left the academy and earned an associate degree in electrical engineering at Brevard Community College in Florida. He then enrolled at his father's alma mater, the Florida Institute of Technology, but dropped out to pursue a professional fighting career, to the elder Wilson's disappointment. During this time, he trained in Pai Lum White Dragon Kung Fu, a form derivative of Shaolin Kung Fu, taught by Danny K. Pai. Wilson was trained by Fred Schmitz, Pai's first black belt in America. Wilson himself typically refers to himself as a kung fu practitioner.

Don's nickname, "The Dragon" was used in his first professional kickboxing match in Orlando, and came from his training in White Dragon style. He also had two other nicknames that were used at times during his long career. Don worked at a Florida bar, the Anchor Club, with WWE wrestlers Hulk Hogan and Brutus "The Barber" Beefcake.

== Kickboxing ==
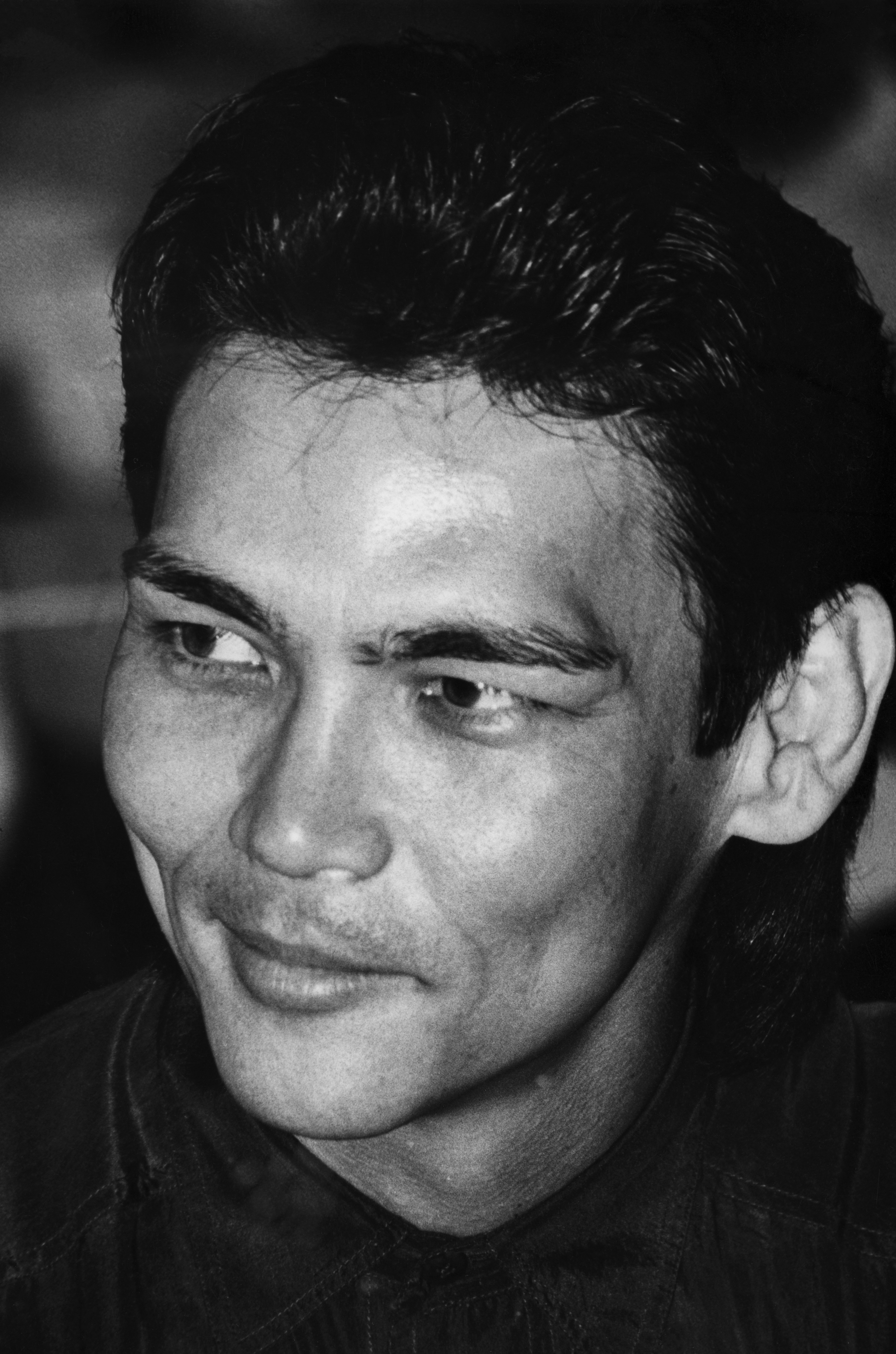
Wilson in 1992

Wilson won a total of 11 world titles with several sanctioning bodies, including the IKF, WKA, KICK, ISKA, STAR and the PKO. Wilson's kickboxing record is listed as 72–5–2 (48 knockouts) with three no-contests. Wilson's kickboxing career spanned four decades, with his first fight being against Bill Knoblok in 1974 in which Wilson broke his hand. In November 1975, he lost to Steve Shepherd by decision.

In July 1977, Wilson defeated Howard Hayden by decision. A report of the match in Official Karate Magazine said, "Don Wilson's showboat tactics have seen him through a couple of fights, but the Flash won't last long when the going gets tough." Wilson said he was insulted and a few people called him Don "The Flash" Wilson after the article. He said that inspired him to prove something: "I got serious."

In September 1979 he defeated Jimmy Horsley by TKO. In March 1980 Wilson was knocked out by Glenn McMorris, which was the only time he was knocked out in his 79 fight career. In July 1980 he defeated Rodney Batiste by decision. In October 1980 Wilson beat Andy White by KO in the 2nd round.

Wilson was noted for being an American-style kickboxer who challenged the fabled fighters from Thailand. He prevailed in most instances, only suffering one loss. However, the matches were often problematic, due to the differences in traditions, style and judging. In September 1981 he won against Panya Sornnoi, also known as Jaidee Pitsarnurachan, by split decision. For his fight against Samart Prasarnmit in December 1983, the officials who arranged the fight broke the previous arrangement, placing Wilson against a lighter opponent and forcing Wilson to lose 8 pounds on the day of the bout by sitting in a sauna from early morning until two hours before the bout, leaving him dangerously dehydrated. Wilson had also negotiated for a 7-round fight, which the officials also neglected to honor. Furthermore, the Thai judges only recognized Muay Thai techniques such as Thai kick or those performed within the clinch, which meant that Wilson's only hope to win was to knockout Samart, which he was unable to do because of his dehydration. Wilson, a fighter used to 12 round fights, was exhausted in the second round, a clear indication of the seriousness of his condition. In September 1984 Wilson fought Thai fighter Fanta Petchmuangtrat and won by decision.

Between 1982 and 1987 he defeated, among others, world champion James Warring, champion Demetrius "Oaktree" Edwards, world champions Curtis Crandall, and Maurice Smith. He beat Steve Valencia, world champion Dennis Alexio and fought to a draw with another champion, Jean-Yves Thériault. He also defeated Art Jimmerson in a kickboxing vs. boxing mixed match and defeated world champion Branko Cikatic.

In July 1988 he defeated previously unbeaten Carl Englund by KO in the 5th round. In March 1989 he fought Ferdinand Mack. Mack was winning on the cards by the 8th round, but Wilson won by TKO in the 9th. In April 1989 Wilson defeated Ken Stranburg by decision and defeated Keith Wilson by TKO. In November 1989 Wilson lost by split decision to the unbeaten Marek Piotrowski. In December 1991 he defeated Ghalib Carmichael by decision.

Wilson won his IKF (www.IKFKickboxing.com) FCR Cruiserweight World Title on May 15, 1999, in Lowell, Massachusetts, when he defeated Dick Kimber. (Lynn, Massachusetts, USA PRO: 23-3/21, AM: 25-0/25 5'9" 197 lbs) At the end of the third round Wilson came alive and eventually knocked Kimber to the floor motionless. Referee Dan Stell counted Kimber out on the floor, a count that went into the round break. Kimber never stood during the count.

Having never been challenged for his title, Wilson voluntarily retired it to move down to the Light Heavyweight Division, where he eventually retired from fighting a few years later. In 2000 he defeated Dewey Cooper in a 10-round decision. His last fight was a 10th-round knockout victory over Eddie Butcher on July 19, 2002, in Atlantic City, New Jersey.

Wilson was scheduled to make a comeback at 58 years old, against an unnamed opponent in a ten-rounder in Istanbul, Turkey in 2013. However, at the last minute the fight in Istanbul was cancelled due to "breach of contract and non-performance of financial agreements".

Wilson also fought several exhibition fights such as those against Bill "Superfoot" Wallace in 1979 and 1984, Gary Daniels in 1991, Jim "Jimbo" Mullen in 1998, and Ian Jacklin. In June 2017 Wilson, at 63 years old, had a rematch against Ferdinand Mack in an exhibition bout 28 years after they originally fought.

=== Kickboxing losses turned into no contests ===
Early in Wilson's career, he lost three fights by decision; these losses were changed into no contests by the Professional Karate Association.

Wilson's first career match was against Bill Knoblock, and he lost a third decision. This match was later turned into a no contest by the Professional Karate Association, as they listed it as an "amateur" match. "This amateur bout was part of Wilson's black belt examination." However, in a 2013 interview, Wilson recalled his first fight as a loss to Bill Knoblock on January 25, 1975, as a professional match in which he was paid $100.

On May 28, 1976, in Tampa, Florida, Wilson lost a 5-round decision to Rudy Burney in a PKA sanctioned match. However, the PKA later overturned the decision for "improper procedures that impeded fair competition."

Finally, in September 1976, Wilson lost a 5-round points decision to Herb Thompson in Fort Lauderdale, Florida. The PKA overturned the decision, citing improper procedures and inappropriate equipment which impeded fair competition.

According to Inside Kung-Fu Presents Kickboxing Magazine (August 1992), Wilson's professional kickboxing record was listed as 69 wins, 5 losses, 2 draws, 46 knockout wins, and 6 kick-knockouts, and 3 no-contests. On page 64, Wilson's first match with Bill Knoblok in Orlando, Florida in December 1974 is listed as a 3-round no-contest. However, on page 52 in the same issue, Wilson said about his fight with Knoblok, "But Bill won the third round by a larger margin than I had won the first. So he won the bout." Today the official result of this fight was listed as a no-contest on Wilson's official fight record because when he decided to fight for PKA, Joe Corley felt the rules of the bout were quite different from those of PKA, Corley told Wilson to omit it.

=== Fighting style ===
Wilson was fairly notable thanks to his unique fighting style as used in the ring. He was ambidextrous, being able to switch stance on a whim and attack powerfully with either side, although he preferred to fight strong-side forward, which is a characteristic of some Chinese Martial arts like Pai Lum Tao Ng Ying Kungfu (Chinese: 五形功夫). Wilson is known for often using a bladed stance, a low lead hand and a high rear hand, typical of crab style fighters, at all ranges.

He identified himself as mainly a kicker, claiming that was his forte and the reason why he never seriously considered boxing. He has a particularly devastating lead side kick, and was known to perform single-leg multiple kicks in rapid succession. Despite his focus on kicks, most of his KO's came through his punching, and he was particularly good with his lead (right) hook punch.

== Professional boxing ==
Wilson had a brief professional boxing career. Wilson said in a 2015 interview that he had a 6–3–0 professional boxing record with all three defeats by first round stoppage. He said he started professional boxing as a training tool to improve his punching, but his trainer forced him to change his style, from the patient fighter he was in kickboxing, to trying to score first-round knockouts. This led to only an average boxing career.

His biggest victory was against Muhammad Ali's former sparring partner John L. Johnson. Wilson's last boxing match took place against Tim Jones on October 21, 1986, at the Reseda Country Club in California. Wilson had a 6–2–0 record in professional boxing going into this match, while Jones was winless in 6 bouts. Wilson lost by TKO at 2:58 of the first round. Dennis Alexio, who lost a kickboxing match to Wilson, had already defeated Jones. Jones lost 4 of his next 5 boxing matches, and retired with a 2–10–1 record.

Wilson also had an exhibition boxing match against USBA and NABA light-middleweight champion Jose Alfredo "Shibata" Flores.

== Commentating ==
Wilson was a fight commentator and interviewer in many of the early UFC events, beginning with UFC 7 in Buffalo. He stated several times that he would be willing to fight in the UFC himself if enough fans requested it, but it never happened. He went on to be a commentator for King of the Cage.

== Film appearances ==
Some movies to his credit include Futurekick, Bloodfist 1–8, Ring of Fire 1, 2 & 3, Out for Blood, Operation Cobra, Blackbelt, Cyber Tracker 1 & 2, Terminal Rush, Redemption, Say Anything..., Capitol Conspiracy, Moving Target, and Batman Forever as the leader of the Neon Gang.

== Kickboxing titles ==
- 2010 World Kickboxing Hall of Fame Champion
- 2008 European Martial Arts Hall of Fame member
- 2000 I.S.K.A. Full Contact Cruiserweight North American Champion −190 lbs
- 1999 I.K.F. Full Contact Cruiserweight World Champion −190 lbs
- 1989 P.K.O. Full Contact Light Heavyweight World Champion −170 lbs
- 1988–89 I.S.K.A. Full Contact Cruiserweight World Champion −182 lbs (0 title defences – vacated)
- 1984 S.T.A.R. Undisputed Full Contact Light Heavyweight World Champion −175 lbs
- 1984 W.K.A. Full Contact Super Light Heavyweight World Champion −184 lbs
- 1984 S.T.A.R. Undisputed Full Contact Super Light Heavyweight World Champion −184 lbs
- 1983–84 W.K.A. Full Contact Cruiserweight World Champion −190 lbs (0 title defences – vacated)
- 1983 S.T.A.R. Undisputed Full Contact Cruiserweight World Champion −184 lbs
- 1983–87 K.I.C.K. Full Contact Light Heavyweight World Champion −175 lbs (2 title defences)
- 1980–91 W.K.A. Full Contact Light Heavyweight World Champion −175 lbs (9 title defences – vacated)
- 1980 S.T.A.R. Undisputed Full Contact Light Heavyweight World Champion −175 lbs
- 1979–80 P.K.A. Full Contact Middleweight United States Champion −170 lbs (2 title defences)
- 1978–79 P.K.A. Full Contact Middleweight Florida State Champion −170 lbs (4 title defences – vacated)

== Professional kickboxing record ==
Professional kickboxing record
72 wins (48 (T)KOs, 24 decisions), 5 losses, 2 draws, 1 no decision, 3 no contests
Date	Result	Opponent	Event	Location	Method	Round	Time	Record
2011-12-03	Exhibition	(England) Kash Gill	"Cinema against Pain" @ Almaty	Kazakhstan	Exhibition	3		72–5–2–3
2002-07-19	Win	(United States) Eddie Butcher	"A Night Of Champions", I.S.K.A. Event @ Tropicana Hotel	Atlantic City, New Jersey, US	KO (overhand right)	10		72–5–2–3
2000-03-17	Win	(United States) Dewey Cooper	I.S.K.A. Event @ MGM Grand	Las Vegas, Nevada, US	Decision	10	2:00	71–5–2–3
Wins I.S.K.A. Full Contact Cruiserweight North American title −190 lbs.
1999-05-14	Win	(United States) Dick Kimber	I.K.F. Event @ Tsongas Arena	Lowell, Massachusetts, US	TKO	3	2:08	70–5–2–3
Wins I.K.F. Full Contact Cruiserweight World Title −190 lbs.
1991-01-12	Win	(United States) Ghalib Carmichael	W.K.A. Event	Anaheim, California, US	Decision	11	2:00	69–5–2–3
Retains W.K.A. full-contact light-heavyweight world title −175 lbs (9th defence). Vacates title after win.
1991-12-03	Exhibition	(United Kingdom) Gary Daniels	World Martial Arts Extravaganza	Birmingham, England	Exhibition	3		68–5–2–3
1990-07-27	Win	(Soviet Union) Yuleeb Kazakov	K.I.C.K. & I.S.K.A. Event @ West Palm Beach Auditorium	West Palm Beach, Florida, US	TKO	5		68–5–2–3
1989-12-01	Win	(Italy) Maurizio Curallo	P.K.O. Event	Rome, Italy	TKO (gave up)	1		67–5–2–3
1989-11-27	Win	(Italy) Giuliano Grillo	P.K.O. Event	Milan, Italy	TKO	2		66–5–2–3
1989-11-04	Loss	(Poland) Marek Piotrowski	F.F.K.A. & P.K.C. Event @ Odeum Expo Center	Chicago, Illinois, US	Decision (split)	12	2:00	65–5–2–3
Fight was for vacant F.F.K.A. & P.K.C. full-contact light-heavyweight world titles. Although his I.S.K.A. full-contact cruiserweight world title was not on the line, Wilson would have to vacate it due to the defeat.
1989-07-03	Win	(United States) Mike Winkeljohn	W.K.A. Event	Costa Mesa, California, US	TKO	10		65–4–2–3
1989-04-20	Win	(England) Keith Wilson	P.K.O. Event	London, England, UK	TKO	4		64–4–2–3
1989-04-13	Win	(Sweden) Ken Stranberg	P.K.O. Event	Gothenburg, Sweden	Decision	5	2:00	63–4–2–3
1989-03-18	Win	(West Germany) Ferdinand Mack	P.K.O. Event	Berlin, Germany	TKO	9		62–4–2–3
Wins inaugural P.K.O. full-contact light-heavyweight world title −170 lbs.
1988-10-08	Win	(United States) Rob Salazar	I.S.K.A. Event	Lake Tahoe, Nevada, US	Decision (split)	12		61–4–2–3
Wins inaugural I.S.K.A. full-contact cruiserweight world title −182 lbs.
1988-07-30	Win	(United States) Carl Englund	W.K.A. & K.I.C.K. Event @ James L. Knight Center	Miami, Florida, US	TKO	4		60–4–2–3
1987-12-12	Win	(Socialist Federal Republic of Yugoslavia) Branko Cikatić	K.I.C.K. Event	Orlando, Florida, US	TKO (punches)	7		59–4–2–3
Retains K.I.C.K. full-contact light-heavyweight world title −175 lbs (2nd defence).
1987-06-22	Win	(United States) Art Jimmerson	W.K.A. Event @ Brassy's Nightclub	Cocoa Beach, Florida, US	KO	6		58–4–2–3
1987-04-22	Win	(United States) Roger Hurd	W.K.A. Event @ Brassy's Nightclub	Cocoa Beach, Florida, US	TKO	4		57–4–2–3
Retains W.K.A. full-contact light-heavyweight world title −175 lbs (8th defence).
1987-01-19	Win	(United States) Paul Ford	W.K.A. Event	Merrit Island, Florida, US	TKO	6		56–4–2–3
1986-09-22	Win	(United States) Rich Lopez	W.K.A. Event @ Brassy's Nightclub	Cocoa Beach, Florida, US	KO (round kick to jaw)	5		55–4–2–3
Retains W.K.A. full-contact light-heavyweight world title −175 lbs (7th defence).
1985-12-06	Win	(United States) Charlie Archie	W.K.A. Event	Miami, Florida, US	KO (kick)	1		54–4–2–3
1985-11-10	Win	(Jamaica) Michael Husbands	I.N.D. Event @ Verdun Auditorium	Montreal, Canada	TKO	5		53–4–2–3
1984-12-18	Draw	(Canada) Jean-Yves Thériault	I.N.D. Event @ Verdun Auditorium	Montreal, Canada	Decision Draw	12	2:00	52–4–2–3
Receives recognition as S.T.A.R. undisputed full-contact light-heavyweight world champion −175 lbs.
1984-09-05	Win	(Thailand) Fanta Petchmuangtrat (Attapong Buadan)	W.K.A. Event @ Queen Elizabeth Stadium	Hong Kong	Decision	7	3:00	52–4–1–3
1984-03-29	Win	(United States) Dennis Alexio	W.K.A. Event	Hollywood, Florida, US	Decision (unanimous)	12	2:00	51–4–1–3
Wins inaugural W.K.A. full-contact super light-heavyweight world title −184 lbs and also receives recognition as S.T.A.R. undisputed full-contact super light-heavyweight world champion −184 lbs. Before taking the fight Wilson voluntarily vacated his W.K.A. full-contact cruiserweight world title in January, 1984. He would later also vacate his W.K.A. super light-heavyweight world title he won against Alexio in October that same year.
1983-12-02	Loss	(Thailand) Samart Prasarnmit	Royal Thai Army Welfare Event @ Lumpinee Stadium	Bangkok, Thailand	Decision	5	3:00	50–4–1–3
1983-11-03	Exhibition	(United States) A.W. Muhammad	W.K.C. Event @ West Palm Beach Auditorium	West Palm Beach, Florida, US	Exhibition	5	2:00	50–3–1–3
1983-09-26	Win	(Thailand) Phongdetnoi Prasopchai	W.K.A. Event @ Queen Elizabeth Stadium	Hong Kong	TKO (spinning back kick)	4		50–3–1–3
1983-08-19	Win	(United States) Jarvis Gradner	W.K.A. Event	Cocoa Beach, Florida, US	Decision	9	2:00	49–3–1–3
1983-07-16	Win	(United States) Steve Valencia	K.I.C.K. Event	New York City, New York, US	TKO	4		48–3–1–3
Retains K.I.C.K. full-contact light-heavyweight world title −175 lbs (1st defence).
1983-05-21	Win	(United States) Maurice Smith	W.K.A. Event	Tokyo, Japan	Decision	11	2:00	47–3–1–3
Wins vacant W.K.A. cruiserweight world title −190 lbs. Also receives recognition as S.T.A.R. undisputed full-contact cruiserweight world champion −184 lbs.
1983-04-19	Win	(United States) Curtis Crandall	K.I.C.K. Event @ Caesars Palace	Las Vegas, Nevada, US	TKO	11		46–3–1–3
Wins inaugural K.I.C.K. full-contact light-heavyweight world title −175 lbs.
1983-03-19	Win	(United States) James Sisco	W.K.A. Event	Nassau, Bahamas	KO	2		45–3–1–3
1982-11-06	Win	(United States) Demetrius Edwards	W.K.C. Event @ West Palm Beach Auditorium	West Palm Beach, Florida, US	Decision	12		44–3–1–3
1982-09-04	Win	(United States) James Warring	W.K.A. Event	Tokyo, Japan	Decision	11	2:00	43–3–1–3
Retains W.K.A. full-contact light-heavyweight world title −175 lbs (6th defence).
1982-04-08	Win	(Thailand) Jaidee Pitsanurachan	W.K.A. Event @ Queen Elizabeth Stadium	Hong Kong	Decision	9		42–3–1–3
Retains W.K.A. full-contact light-heavyweight world title −175 lbs (5th defence).
1982-02-08	Win	(United States) James Sisco	W.K.A. Event @ Queen Elizabeth Stadium	Hong Kong	TKO	4		41–3–1–3
Retains W.K.A. full-contact light-heavyweight world title −175 lbs (4th defence).
1981-12-07	Win	(United States) Dennis Downey	W.K.A. Event @ Brassy's Nightclub	Cocoa Beach, Florida, US	DQ (biting)	7		40–3–1–3
1981-12-07	Win	(United States) Mark Zacharatos	W.K.A. Event @ Imperial Palace	Las Vegas, Nevada, US	KO	3		39–3–1–3
Retains W.K.A. full-contact light-heavyweight world title −175 lbs (3rd defence).
1981-09-08	Win	(Thailand) Jaidee Pitsanurachan	W.K.A. Event @ Queen Elizabeth Stadium	Hong Kong	Decision (split)	7	2:00	38–3–1–3
Retains W.K.A. full-contact light-heavyweight world title −175 lbs (2nd defence).
1981-07-25	Win	(United States) Al Mims	W.K.A. Event @ West Palm Beach Auditorium	West Palm Beach, Florida, US	KO	3		37–3–1–3
1981-06-24	Win	(Pakistan) Muhammed Ashraf Tai	W.K.A. Event	Tokyo, Japan	KO	2		36–3–1–3
1981-05-15	Win	(United States) Larry Nichols	W.K.A. Event @ St. Lucie Civic Center	Fort Pierce, Florida, US	KO (kick)	5		35–3–1–3
1981-03-23	Win	(United States) Greg Smith	W.K.A. Event @ Brassy's Nightclub	Cocoa Beach, Florida, US	Decision	5	2:00	34–3–1–3
1981-03-10	Win	(United States) Herbie Thompson	W.K.A. Event	Westchester, New York, US	KO	8		33–3–1–3
Retains W.K.A. full-contact light-heavyweight world title −175 lbs (1st defence).
1981-02-10	Win	(United States) Eddie Dourant	W.K.A. Event @ St. Lucie Civic Center	Fort Pierce, Florida, US	TKO	7		32–3–1–3
1980-12-01	Win	(United States) Larry Lockhart	W.K.A. Event @ Brassy's Nightclub	Cocoa Beach, Florida, US	TKO	4		31–3–1–3
1980-10-13	Win	(United States) Andy White	W.K.A. Event @ Brassy's Nightclub	Cocoa Beach, Florida, US	KO	2		30–3–1–3
Wins inaugural W.K.A. full-contact light-heavyweight world title −175 lbs. Also receives recognition as S.T.A.R. undisputed full-contact light-heavyweight world champion −175 lbs.
1980-07-21	Win	(United States) Rodney Batiste	P.K.A. World Championship Eliminations @ Brassy's Nightclub	Cocoa Beach, Florida, US	Decision	10	2:00	29–3–1–3
Wins eliminator for shot at vacant P.K.A. and S.T.A.R. full-contact middleweight world titles against Jean-Yves Thériault. This fight would never materialise, however, due to a number of contractual & promotional issues.
1980-06-?	Win	(United States) Steve Mackey	P.K.A. Event @ West Palm Beach Auditorium	West Palm Beach, Florida, US	KO	1		28–3–1–3
1980-05-20	Win	(United States) Larry Doggert		Cocoa Beach, Florida, US	KO	7		27–3–1–3
1980-04-14	Win	(United States) Bernard Clark	P.K.A. Event @ Brassy's Nightclub	Cocoa Beach, Florida, US	TKO	6		26–3–1–3
1980-03-05	Loss	(United States) Glenn McMorris	P.K.A. Event @ West Palm Beach Auditorium	West Palm Beach, Florida, US	TKO	1		25–3–1–3
Loses P.K.A. full-contact middleweight U.S. title −170 lbs.
1980-02-08	Win	(United States) Larry Poore	West Palm Beach Auditorium	West Palm Beach, Florida, US	TKO	7		25–2–1–3
1980-01-?	Win	(United States) Greg Strong	P.K.A. Event	Miami, Florida, US	TKO (kick)	7		24–2–1–3
Retains P.K.A. full-contact middleweight U.S. title −170 lbs (1st defence).
1979-11-10	Draw	(United States) Steve Mackey	P.K.A. Event	Orlando, Florida, US	Technical draw	2		23–2–1–3
1979-10-23	Win	(United States) Willie Ruffin	Orlando Sports Stadium	Orlando, Florida, US	TKO	5		23–2–0–3
1979-09-15	Win	(United States) Jimmy Horsley	P.K.A. Event	Orlando, Florida, US	TKO	7		22–2–0–3
Wins P.K.A. full-contact middleweight U.S. title −170 lbs.
1979-08-?	Win	(United States) Danny Wedges	W.K.A. Event @ West Palm Beach Auditorium	West Palm Beach, Florida, US	KO	1		21–2–0–3
1979-08-?	Win	(United States) John Shields		Bradenton, Florida, US	TKO	2		20–2–0–3
1979-07-?	Win	(United States) Al Durr		Orlando, Florida, US	KO	3		19–2–0–3
1979-06-23	Win	(United States) Benny Fernandez	P.K.A. Event	Bradenton, Florida, US	DQ (hit & hold clinching)	1		18–2–0–3
Retains P.K.A. full-contact middleweight Florida State title −170 lbs (4th defence).
1979-06-09	Win	(United States) Willie Ruffin		Miami, Florida, US	TKO	3		17–2–0–3
1979-05-26	Win	(United States) Jeff Gripper	W.K.A. Event @ West Palm Beach Auditorium	West Palm Beach, Florida, US	Decision	7	2:00	16–2–0–3
1979-03-07	Win	(United States) Ted Pryor	West Palm Beach Auditorium	West Palm Beach, Florida, US	Decision	7	2:00	15–2–0–3
1979-02-17	Win	(United States) Rich Cook	P.K.A. Event	Stuart, Florida, US	Decision	7	2:00	14–2–0–3
Retains P.K.A. full-contact middleweight Florida State title −170 lbs (3rd defence).
1979-01-13	Win	(United States) James Sisco	P.K.A. Event	Bradenton, Florida, US	TKO	4		13–2–0–3
Retains P.K.A. full-contact middleweight Florida State title −170 lbs (2nd defence).
1978-12-?	Win	(United States) Rick Herranz	West Palm Beach Auditorium	West Palm Beach, Florida, US	KO	1		12–2–0–3
1978-12-02	Win	(United States) Herbie Thompson	P.K.A. Event	Stuart, Florida, US	Decision	7	2:00	11–2–0–3
Retains P.K.A. full-contact middleweight Florida State title −170 lbs (1st defence).
1978-11-18	Win	(United States) Ron Harry	P.K.A. Event	Fort Lauderdale, Florida, US	KO	1		10–2–0–3
1978-10-20	Loss	(United States) Robert Biggs	P.K.A. Event	West Palm Beach, Florida, US	Decision (split)	5	2:00	9–2–0–3
1978-09-23	Win	(United States) Ted Pryor	P.K.A. Event	Fort Lauderdale, Florida, US	Decision	5	2:00	9–1–0–3
Wins P.K.A. full-contact middleweight Florida State title −170 lbs.
1978-04-08	Win	(United States) Charlie Jordan	P.K.A. Event	Miami, Florida, US	DQ (failed minimum kicks rule)	4		8–1–0–3
1977-10-08	Win	(United States) Robert Parris		Melbourne, Florida, US	Decision	7	2:00	7–1–0–3
1977-09-10	Win	(United States) James Sisco	P.K.A. Event	Miami, Florida, US	KO (side kick to body)	3		6–1–0–3
1977-07-18	Win	(United States) Howard Hayden	West Palm Beach Auditorium	West Palm Beach, Florida, US	Decision	5	2:00	5–1–0–3
1977-05-?	Win	(United States) John Sweet		Miami, Florida, US	Decision	5	2:00	4–1–0–3
1977-03-?	Win	(United States) Robert Dillard		Melbourne, Florida, US	Decision	3	2:00	3–1–0–3
1976-09-?	NC	(United States) Herbie Thompson		Fort Lauderdale, Florida, US	No contest	5	2:00	2–1–0–3
P.K.A. changed result due to improper procedures & equipment which hindered fair competition.
1976-05-28	NC	(United States) Rudy Burney	P.K.A. Event	Tampa, Florida, US	No contest	5	2:00	2–1–0–2
Questionable decision for Burney was changed by P.K.A. due to judging/promoting elements which prevented a fair result for Wilson.
1975-11-?	Loss	(United States) Steve Shepherd		Miami, Florida, US	Decision	3	2:00	2–1–0–1
1975-08-?	Win	(United States) Ben Green		Melbourne, Florida, US	Decision	5	2:00	2–0–0–1
1975-05-?	Win	(United States) Ken Broadway		Melbourne, Florida, US	KO (side kick to body)	3		1–0–0–1
1975-01-25	NC	(United States) Bill Knoblock	Space Coast Karate Tournament	Orlando, Florida, US	No contest	3	2:00	0-0-0-1
Part of Wilson's black belt examination. PKA changed result to no contest, which both participants and promoters agreed on.
Legend: Win Loss Draw/no contest Exhibition Notes

== Professional boxing record ==
From BoxRec:

Result	Opponent	Method	Date	Round	Time	Event	Location	Notes
Loss	(United States) Tim Jones	KO	Oct 28, 1986	1			Reseda, California	
Win	(United States) Roke Harris	KO	Jul 25, 1986	4			San Diego, California	
Win	(United States) Frank Charles		May 1986				Reseda, California	
Loss	(Mexico) Miguel Murillo	KO	Mar 17, 1986	2			Inglewood, California	
Win	(United States) Harold Thames	TKO	Feb 16, 1983	3			Fort Lauderdale, Florida	
Win	(United States) Dennis Korall	PTS	Sep 16, 1982	6			Tampa, Florida	

== Filmography ==
=== Film ===
Year	Title	Role	Notes	Ref.
1982	New York Chinatown	Bit part		
1988	The Expendables	Wilson		
1988	The Firing Line	Government Soldier		
1989	Say Anything...	Sparring Partner		
1989	Bloodfist	Jake Raye		
1990	Bloodfist II	Jake Raye		
1991	Ring of Fire	Johnny Woo	Also fight choreographer	
1991	Future Kick	Walker	Also fight choreographer	
1992	Bloodfist III: Forced to Fight	Jimmy Boland	Also fight choreographer	
1992	Blackbelt	Jack Dillon		
1992	Out for Blood	John Decker	Also producer	
1992	Bloodfist IV: Die Trying	Danny Holt	Also producer and fight choreographer	
1993	Ring of Fire II: Blood and Steel	Johnny Woo	Also producer and fight choreographer	
1993	Magic Kid	Himself		
1994	Bloodfist V: Human Target	Jim Stanton		
1994	Red Sun Rising	Thomas Hoshino		
1994	CyberTracker	Eric Phillips		
1995	Bloodfist VI: Ground Zero	Nick Corrigan	Also producer	
1995	Ring of Fire 3: Lion Strike	Johnny Woo	Also storywriter	
1995	Batman Forever	Gang Leader		
1995	Bloodfist VII: Manhunt	Jim Trudell	Also producer	
1995	CyberTracker 2	Eric	Also producer	
1995	The Power Within	Himself		
1995	Virtual Combat	David Quarry		
1996	Bloodfist VIII: Trained to Kill	Rick Cowan / George "Mac" MacReady		
1996	Terminal Rush	Jacob Harper	Also producer	
1996	Night Hunter	Jack Cutter	Also producer	
1997	Hollywood Safari	Greg		
1997	Inferno	Kyle Conners		
1997	Papertrail	FBI Agent Ryu		
1998	Whatever It Takes	Neil	Also producer	
1998	The Prophet	Jarrid Maddox		
2000	Moving Target	Ray Brock	Also producer	
2002	Redemption	John Sato Collins	Also producer	
2002	Stealing Harvard	Loach's Friend		
2004	Sci-Fighter	Jack Tanaka	Also producer	
2006	Crooked	Danny Tyler	Also producer	
2006	18 Fingers of Death!	Himself		
2007	The Last Sentinel	Tallis	Also producer	
2012	Liberator	"Sidewinder"	Also producer	
2015	The Scorpion King 4: Quest for Power	Gizzan		
2015	Diamond Cartel	Mr. Lo		
2015	The Martial Arts Kid	Glen		
2015	One More Round	Bob Paulson		
2015	Underdog Kids	Himself, Judge		
2016	Showdown in Manila	Dillon		
2016	The Horde	War Veteran		
2017	Death Fighter	Bobby Pau		
2018	The Hitman Agency	"The Dragon"		
2018	Enter the Fist and the Golden Fleecing	Master Duck Suck Song		
2019	Devotion	Himself		
2021	New York Ninja	John Liu (voice)	Dubbed John Liu	
2024	The Shepherd Code	Lewis		
2024	Taken from Rio Bravo	Angel		
2024	Black Creek	Xiyang		
2025	The Shepherd Code: Road Back	Lewis		
2026	The Shepherd Code: Lapierre	Lewis		
2026	Robot Dracula	Jack Cutter		

=== Television ===
Year	Title	Role	Notes	Ref.
1997	Moesha	Himself	Episode: "Break It Down"	
2001	Walker, Texas Ranger	Himself	Episode: "Legends"	
2002	Modern Warriors	Himself	TV special	
2009	Hollywood Lives	Himself	Only appears in one episode.	

=== Documentary appearances ===
Year	Title	Notes	Ref.
1995	Top Fighter		
2002	Mass Destruction		
2003	How to Be an Action Star		

== Awards ==
Lifetime achievement honors:

In 2015, he was inducted into the International Sports Hall of Fame.

In 2014, he was honored with the U.F. of Legends Dragon Award at the Urban Action Showcase & Expo at HBO.

Inducted into the World Kickboxing League Hall of Fame (2011).

Inducted into the Martial Arts Hall of Fame (2001).

Recognized by STAR as the "Top-Rated Kickboxer of All Time" for his career spanning 1977 to 1989.

World record:

Holds the 2002 Guinness World Record for winning the "Most Kickboxing World Titles."

Annual accolades: Wilson was a dominant force throughout the 1980s, consistently earning top honors from major publications.

Fighter of the Year:

Awarded this title by Official Karate magazine in 1984, 1985, and 1988.

Also named "Mr. Kickboxing" by the WKA on NBC-TV's Sports World in 1984.

Fight of the Year:

His bouts were deemed classics, with his matches against Maurice Smith (1984), Jean-Yves Theriault (1985), and Branimir Cikatić (1988) all winning Official Karate magazine's "Fight of the Year."

Additional recognition:

Named one of the "Top Kickboxers of the Year" in 1986. Honored as "Fighter of the Year" by American Karate magazine in 1988.
