= Marek Piotrowski vs. Don Wilson =

- Date: November 4, 1989
- Venue: Odeum Expo Center in Villa Park, Illinois, USA
- Title(s) on the line: Vacant FFKA and PKC Light Heavyweight Championships

Tale of the tape
Boxer	(Poland) Marek Piotrowski	(United States) Don Wilson
Nickname	"The Punisher"	"The Dragon"
Hometown	Dębe Wielkie, Poland	Cocoa Beach, Florida, USA
Pre-fight record	22-0	65-4-2 (3)
Height	6 ft 2 in (1.88 m)	6 ft 1 in (1.85 m)
Weight	180 lb (82 kg)	180 lb (82 kg)
Style	Kickboxing, Boxing; Kyokushin Karate; Jujutsu	Gōjū-ryū Karate, Kickboxing, Pai Lum Tao Kung Fu
Recognition	PKC U.S. Middleweight Champion	ISKA World Cruiserweight Champion; PKO World Light Heavyweight Champion

Result
- Piotrowski defeated Wilson via split decision after twelve rounds.

Marek Piotrowski vs. Don "The Dragon" Wilson was a light heavyweight kickboxing bout that took place in Chicago, Illinois, USA on November 4, 1989, in which heavy favourite Wilson lost in a surprise upset.

== Background ==
Marek Piotrowski had a storied amateur career in Europe, winning the gold medal in full contact kickboxing (-81 kg) at the W.A.K.O. World Championships 1987, before emigrating to Chicago, Illinois, USA and turning professional. In August 1989, he defeated Rick Roufus to win the PKC U.S. Middleweight Championship. This would be his last fight at middleweight, however, as he then moved up to light heavyweight to face Don "The Dragon" Wilson.

Wilson came from a karate and kung fu background and started his career fighting in his native Florida in 1974. After winning the Florida state and American titles, he took the WKA Light Heavyweight Championship of the World in October 1980 when he defeated Andy White by knockout. He had defended the title eight times by the time of the Piotrowski fight, and also took the KICK World Light Heavyweight title from Curtis Crandall and the WKA Cruiserweight World title from Maurice Smith in 1983. In October 1988, Wilson won the ISKA cruiserweight title by beating Rob Salazar, and then in March 1989 defeated Ferdinand Mack for the PKO World Light Heavyweight Championship.

Although Piotrowski held an impressive win over Rick Roufus, he was considered a relative newcomer to the sport and an underdog against Wilson, who had defeated fighters such as Dennis Alexio, Branko Cikatić and Maurice Smith.

== The fight ==
Piotrowski faced Wilson on November 4, 1989 at the Odeum Expo Center in Chicago, Illinois, USA in front of a crowd of over 5,000. Although Wilson held the PKO World Light Heavyweight Championship, it was not on the line. Instead, the vacant FFKA and PKC Light Heavyweight Championships were up for grabs.

After twelve, two-minute rounds under American kickboxing rules, Piotrowski was named the winner via split decision. Although it was a close fight, many believe that it was Piotrowski's superior boxing skills that won him the fight.

== Aftermath ==
Marek Piotrowski's win was considered a massive upset as he was the underdog in the fight. Don Wilson had been one of the United States' best known kickboxers for around a decade, whereas Piotrowski had made his name only months before when he defeated Rick Roufus in another upset win. Wilson wanted a rematch, and offered to put his PKO World Light Heavyweight Championship on the line, but it never came to fruition.

Piotrowski went on to win the KICK Light Heavyweight Intercontinental and World titles the following year. In a rematch with Roufus in 1991, for the ISKA Light Heavyweight World title, he was knocked out with a high kick in the second round. He moved up to heavyweight later in his career and became the WKA World Champion there. Wilson, meanwhile, went on to defend his WKA light heavyweight title against Ghalib Carmichael before retiring in 1991. He did have a short career comeback between 1999 and 2002, however. Both men went down as greats in kickboxing history, but Wilson is significantly more recognised.
