= Abby Dalton =

American actress (1932–2020)

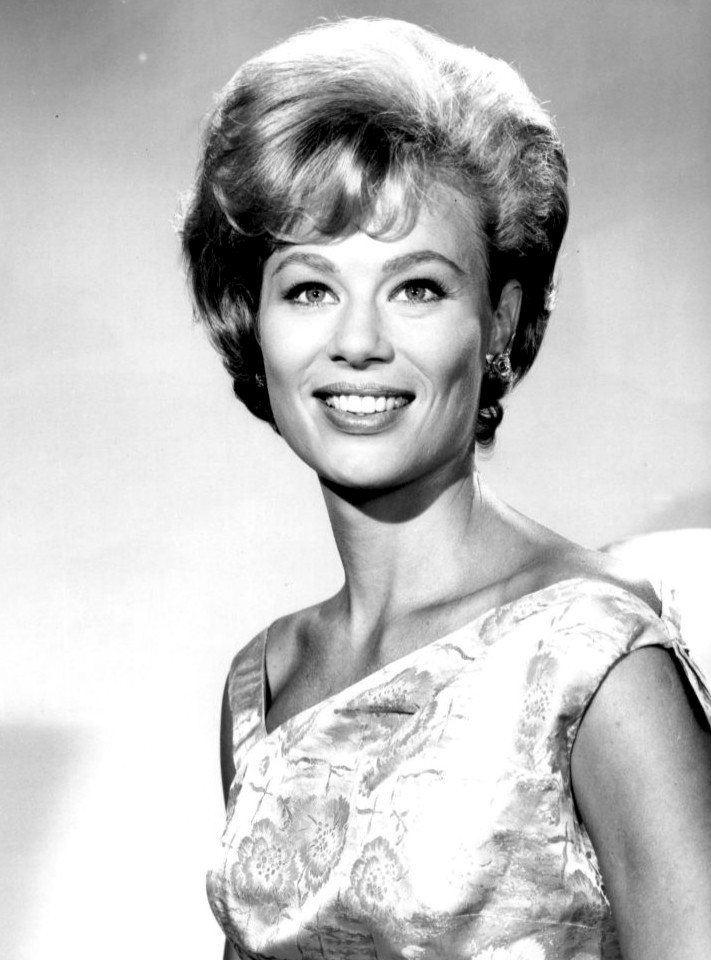
- Dalton in 1963
- Born: Gladys Marlene Wasden; August 15, 1932; Las Vegas, Nevada, U.S.
- Died: November 23, 2020 (aged 88); Los Angeles, California, U.S.
- Occupation: Actress
- Years active: 1957–2013
- Known for: Falcon Crest; Hennesey; The Joey Bishop Show
- Spouse(s): Joe Mondragon (div. 1959) Jack Smith (m. 1960)
- Children: 3, including Kathleen Kinmont

Gladys Marlene Wasden (August 15, 1932 – November 23, 2020), known professionally as Abby Dalton, was an American actress, known for her television roles on the sitcoms Hennesey (1959–1962) and The Joey Bishop Show (1962–1965), and the primetime soap opera Falcon Crest (1981–1986).

== Life and career ==
Dalton was born Gladys Marlene Wasden on August 15, 1932, in Las Vegas, Nevada. Dalton had three children by her marriage to Jack Smith, including actress Kathleen Kinmont, who was married to Lorenzo Lamas, Dalton's onscreen son in Falcon Crest.

=== Television ===
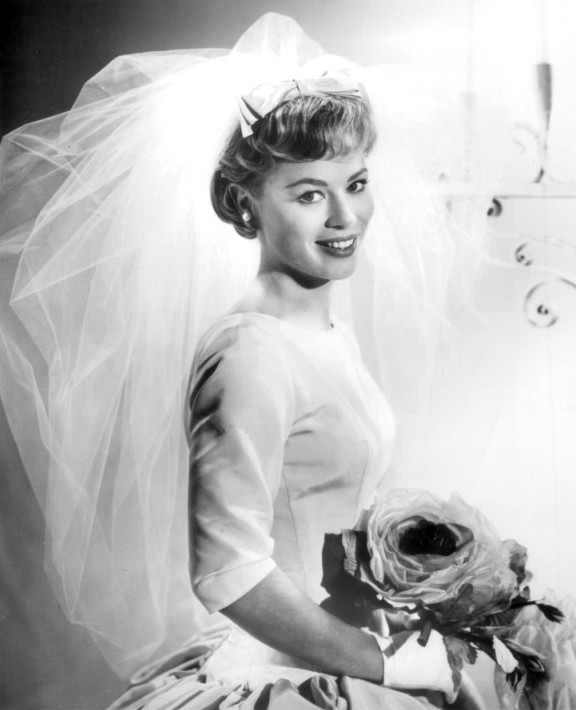
Dalton as a happy Martha Hale in the final Hennessey episode, September 17, 1962

Dalton made numerous appearances on television. James Garner and Clint Eastwood engaged in a fist fight over Dalton in the episode "Duel at Sundown" of Maverick. In 1958, she played the love interest of gunfighters on Have Gun Will Travel, starring Richard Boone, and The Rifleman, starring Chuck Connors. She appeared as Eloise Barton in an episode of the Western series Jefferson Drum, starring Jeff Richards.

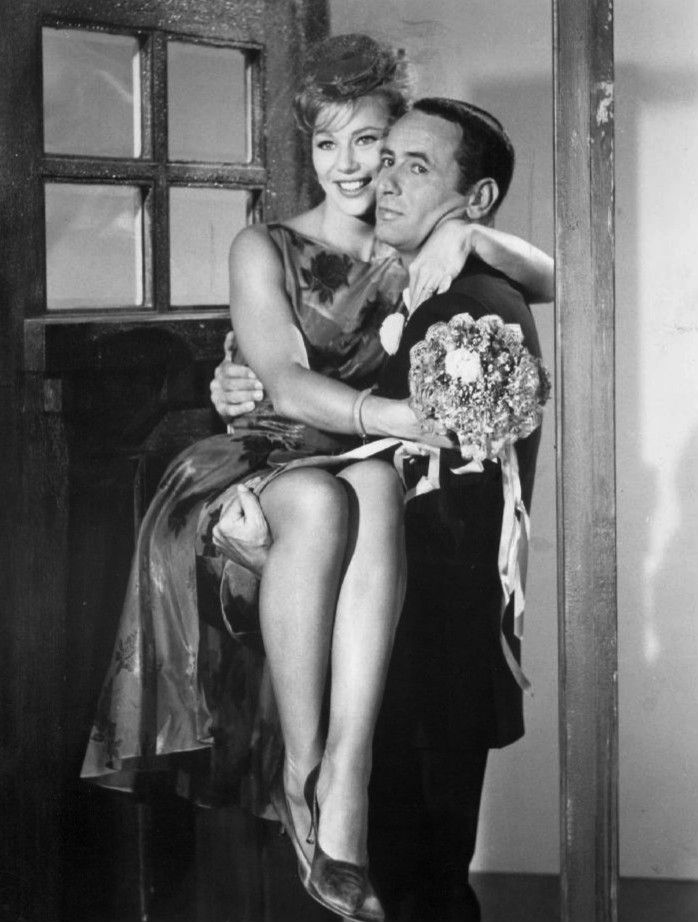
Carried across the threshold by Joey Bishop on The Joey Bishop Show sitcom, September 15, 1962

From 1959 to 1962, Dalton played nurse Martha Hale on Hennesey (she was nominated for an Emmy Award for her role) with former child star Jackie Cooper in the title role, and she portrayed Joey Bishop's wife on The Joey Bishop Show from 1962 to 1965. As the Hennesey series was ending, The Joey Bishop Show was preparing for the start of its second season on NBC. Dalton played the role of Ellie Barnes, the wife of Joey Barnes (Bishop). As the season began on September 15, 1962, Dalton and Bishop are shown as newlyweds Ellie and Joey Barnes. Hennesey's finale was aired two days later on September 17, 1962, with Martha Hale's marriage to Chick Hennesey. Hence, Dalton portrayed being married to two different titular television sitcom characters on two different networks within two days.

Dalton was a semi-regular panelist on NBC and syndicated Match Game and appeared in the early years of Hollywood Squares. Dalton also appeared on Super Password, with Bert Convy as the host, and guest-starred on the interview program Here's Hollywood.

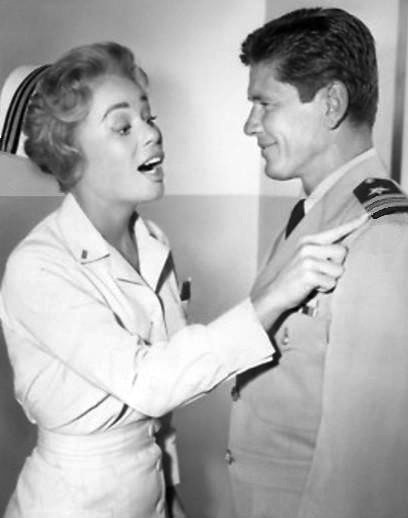
With guest star Charles Bronson in Hennesey (1960)

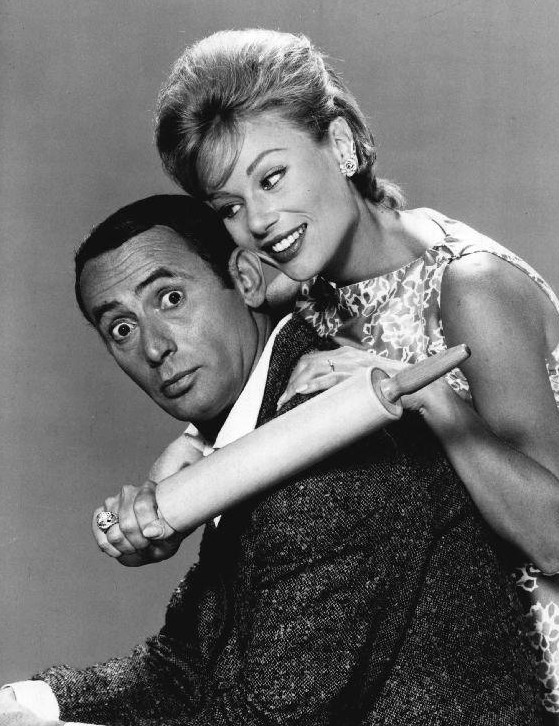
With Joey Bishop in The Joey Bishop Show sitcom (1962)

Dalton was cast in the original pilot for what became the ABC series Barney Miller as Barney's wife. However, this version of the pilot, for a show titled The Days and Nights of Captain Barney Miller, was rejected by the network, and the role wound up being recast with Barbara Barrie. In 1977, she appeared in an episode of the crime drama The Feather and Father Gang.

In the 1980s, Dalton played winemaker Julia Cumson on Falcon Crest. In the show, Julia is the daughter of Angela Channing (Jane Wyman) and the mother of Lance Cumson (Lorenzo Lamas). Julia was at quiet odds with her mother, Angela, and for the show's first two seasons, she was a troubled but nonviolent person. In the second-season finale, however, she was revealed to be a killer. Much of the third season focused on her dealing with life both in prison and in a mental institution, and toward the end of the season, her character escaped from the mental institution to try to kill her mother. Julia was believed to have been killed in the second to last episode, but soon into the fourth season, she was revealed to be still alive. She returned sporadically during the fifth and sixth seasons, but did not reappear after 1986. After leaving the series, Dalton had guest-starring roles on Hotel and Murder, She Wrote.

Dalton also was a TV game player and regular on Stump the Stars (1964), PDQ (1970) and Match Game (1973–74). She appeared on The Rifleman in the episode "The Marshal" as hotel clerk Nancy Moore.

=== Movies ===
In 1957, Dalton played roles in the Roger Corman films Teenage Doll, Carnival Rock, and The Saga of the Viking Women and Their Voyage to the Waters of the Great Sea Serpent. Her first leading role was in the 1957 film Rock All Night produced by American International Pictures. The following year, she starred in Stakeout on Dope Street, Girls on the Loose, The High Cost of Loving and Cole Younger, Gunfighter. In 1966, Dalton played Calamity Jane in The Plainsman with Don Murray, and appeared in the rarely seen film A Whale of a Tale (1976), with William Shatner and Marty Allen. Her later films included the Don "The Dragon" Wilson movie CyberTracker (1994), Buck and the Magic Bracelet (1999), and the horror film Prank (2008).

== Death ==
Dalton died on November 23, 2020, in Los Angeles after a long illness.

== Filmography ==
=== Film ===
Year	Title	Role	Notes
1957	Rock All Night	Julie	
1957	Teenage Doll		uncredited
1957	The Saga of the Viking Women and Their Voyage to the Waters of the Great Sea Serpent	Desir	
1957	Carnival Rock	Girl at Carnival	uncredited
1958	Cole Younger, Gunfighter	Lucy Antrim	
1958	Girls on the Loose	Agnes Clark	
1958	Stakeout on Dope Street	Kathy	
1958	The High Cost of Loving	Cora, Secretary	uncredited
1966	The Plainsman	Calamity Jane	
1976	A Whale of a Tale	Anne Fields	
1989	Roller Blade Warriors: Taken by Force	Mother Speed	
1994	CyberTracker	Chief Olson	
1998	Buck and the Magic Bracelet	Ma Dalton	
2008	Prank	Mrs. Sweeney	
2013	Mrs. Sweeney	Mrs. Sweeney	Short

=== Television ===
Year	Title	Role	Notes
1958	Schlitz Playhouse of Stars	Belle Starr	Season 7 Episode 35: "Way of the West"
1958	The Rifleman	Nancy Moore	Season 1 Episode 4: "The Marshal"
1958	Have Gun - Will Travel	Meg Wellman	Season 2 Episode 9: "Young Gun"
1958	Jefferson Drum	Eloise Barton	Season 2 Episode 10: "Thicker Than Water"
1959	Sugarfoot	Elizabeth Bingham	Season 2 Episode 9: "The Desperadoes"
1959	Maverick	Carrie Christianson	Season 2 Episode 19: "Duel at Sundown"
1959	Rawhide	Ruth	Season 1 Episode 8: "Incident West of Lano"
1959	Mike Hammer	Stacy Lee	Season 2 Episode 21: "Curtains for an Angel"
1959–1962	Hennesey	Lt. Martha Hale Hennesey, RN	Series regular
1960	The Chevy Mystery Show	Karen Prescott	Season 1 Episode 7: "Dead Man's Walk"
1962	Hawaiian Eye	Julie Gant	Season 3 Episode 29: "Nightmare in Paradise"
1962–1965	The Joey Bishop Show	Ellie Barnes	Series regular
1967	The Danny Thomas Hour	Mary Danopolous	Season 1 Episode 2: "Instant Money"
1967	The Jonathan Winters Show	Self	
1968	My Three Sons	Janet Ingram	Season 8 Episode 28: "Gossip, Incorporated"
1969	Anderson and Company	Augusta Anderson	TV Movie
1970	Nanny and the Professor	Dr. Elizabeth Carlson	Season 2 Episode 8: "The Masculine-Feminine Mystique"
1970–1974	Love, American Style	Delores / Barbara Finletter	3 episodes
1972	Magic Carpet	Lucy Kane	TV Movie
1974	Police Story	Liz Rollins	Season 1 Episode 14: "Cop in the Middle"
1974	Apple's Way	Nancy Benton	Season 1 Episode 8: "The Temptation"
1974	Grandpa, Mom, Dad and Richie		TV Movie
1974	Barney Miller	Elizabeth Miller	Season 1 Episode 0: "The Life and Times of Barney Miller"
1975	Adams of Eagle Lake	Margaret Kelly	2 episodes
1976	The Waltons	Stella Lewis	Season 4 Episode 20: "The Test"
1977	The Feather and Father Gang	Ruth Marks	Season 1 Episode 10: "Murder at F-Stop 11"
1981–1987	Falcon Crest	Julia Cumson	100 episodes
1983–1984	The Love Boat	Ellen Baker / Martha Parker	3 episodes
1983–1987	Hotel	Helen Scofield / Laura Carpenter	2 episodes
1986	Hardcastle and McCormick	Fran Hendrix	Season 3 Episode 17: "Round Up the Old Gang"
1986	Murder, She Wrote	Judith Keats	Season 3 Episode 9: "Obituary for a Dead Anchor"
1995	The Young and the Restless	Lydia Summers #1	
1997	L.A. Heat	Bridgette Peterson	Season 1 Episode 26: "Wake Up Call"
