= McMorris =

McMorris is a surname. Notable people with the surname include:

- Cathy McMorris Rodgers (born 1969), American politician
- Charles McMorris (1890–1954), United States Navy admiral
- Craig McMorris (born 1991), Canadian snowboarder
- Don McMorris (born 1961), Canadian politician
- Easton McMorris (born 1935), Jamaican cricketer
- Glenn McMorris, American kickboxer and karateka
- Jerry McMorris (died 2012), American baseball executive
- Kristina McMorris, American writer
- Lois McMorris, American rock musician
- Mark McMorris (born 1993), Canadian snowboarder
- Patrick McMorris (born 2001), American football player
