= Jean-Yves Thériault =

Canadian kickboxer

- Born: Jean-Yves Thériault; Paquetville, New Brunswick, Canada
- Other names: The Iceman
- Nationality: Canadian
- Division: Middleweight
- Style: Kickboxing
- Fighting out of: Ottawa, Ontario, Canada
- Rank: Instructor in Muay Thai; Black belt in Ju-Jitsu

Kickboxing record
- Total: 76
- Wins: 69
- By knockout: 61
- Losses: 6
- By knockout: 3
- Draws: 1

Jean-Yves Thériault is a Canadian kickboxer, kickboxing trainer, and author.

== Biography ==
Jean-Yves Thériault was born in Paquetville, New Brunswick, Canada. He was the fifth of six sons.

Thériault began his martial arts training in 1972 at age 17, achieving blue belt status in Jujutsu before becoming interested in Karate and Full Contact Karate a few years later. He won his first Full Contact Karate competition in 1976 after only six months of training under the direction of John Therien (who now holds Hanshi degree in Ju-Jitsu), and subsequently became Canadian middleweight kickboxing champion two and a half years later. In 1980 he won the PKA Middleweight World title (Full-contact karate), and held the championship for a record of 15 years. He has also won world titles in both the ISKA and PKC associations. During the peak of his career, Thériault held only a yellow belt in Karate.

He was referred to as "The Iceman," a nickname given to him by Rodney Batiste during his first title defence, due to his intimidating icy stare and cool demeanour in the ring. Thériault has a number of high-profile victories, including two wins against future four-time K-1 champion Ernesto Hoost and a draw against the legendary Don "The Dragon" Wilson. He has also fought world champions such as Rob Kaman, Tosca Petridis and Rick Roufus.

Thériault has worked with many groups and charities, such as the Big Brothers, Make a Wish Foundation - Canada, Leucan. He is author of a book on kickboxing techniques and has a series of videos on the science of combat sports. He is the subject of an hour and a half film produced by the National Film Board. He was voted Athlete of the Decade by the Sports Writers Association of New Brunswick. However, the New Brunswick Sports Hall of Fame still will not induct him into their ranks after several attempts by fans and friends.

Since his retirement on December 1, 1995, (a third-round knockout of Marcus Reid) Thériault still trains five days a week and teaches classes at Therien Ju-Jitsu & Kickboxing Schools.

Thériault has also become a promoter for the sport of kickboxing. With the aid of his friend Hanshi John Therien, he is giving young fighters an opportunity in the "Iceman Amateur Kickboxing Circuit".

Thériault obtained his Black Belt in Ju-Jitsu in early 2008.

== Titles ==
- 1995 I.S.K.A. Full Contact Light Heavyweight World Champion
- 1992 I.S.K.A. Full Contact Super Middleweight World Champion
- 1988 I.S.K.A. Full Contact Light Heavyweight World Champion
- I.S.K.A. Full Contact Super Middleweight World Champion
- P.K.C. Super Middleweight Full Contact World Champion
- 1980-1995 P.K.A. Full Contact Middleweight World Champion
- 1978 Canadian Full Contact Middleweight Kickboxing Champion

== Professional kickboxing record ==
Thériault fought 76 fights from June 1976 to December 1995. Of those fights, 69 were wins (61 knockouts), 6 were losses, and 1 was a draw. The one draw was with Don "The Dragon" Wilson on December 18, 1984. Thériault was full-contact World Champion 23 times.

Kickboxing Record
69 wins (61 (T)KOs, 8 Decisions), 6 Losses, 1 Draw
| Date | Result | Opponent | Event | Location | Method | Round | Time | Record |
| 1995-12-01 | Win | (United States) Marcus Reed | | Montreal, Quebec, Canada | TKO | 3 | | 69-6-1 |
Wins vacant I.S.K.A. Full Contact Light Heavyweight World title.
| 1994-03-26 | Loss | (United States) Rick Roufus | Karatemania VIII | Montreal, Quebec, Canada | Decision (Unanimous) | 12 | | 68-6-1 |
Fight was for Roufus's P.K.C. Light Heavyweight World title.
| 1993-11-? | Win | (Russia) Sergei Andrianov | | Montreal, Quebec, Canada | KO | 3 | | 68-5-1 |
| 1993-06-22 | Loss | (Greece) Tosca Petridis | | Montreal, Quebec, Canada | Decision (Split) | 12 | | 67-5-1 |
Loses P.K.C. Full Contact Super Middleweight World title.
| 1992-12-15 | Win | (Netherlands) Leo De Snoo | | Montreal, Quebec, Canada | Disqualification | 11 | | 67-4-1 |
Wins vacant I.S.K.A. Full Contact Super Middleweight World title.
| 1992-06-20 | Loss | (Netherlands) Rob Kaman | | Paris, France | TKO (Gave Up) | 5 | 2:00 | 66-4-1 |
Fight was for Thériault's I.S.K.A. Full Contact Super Middleweight World title and Kaman's W.K.A. Full Contact Light Heavyweight World title. The I.S.K.A. title would be vacated due to Kaman coming in over the weight for the fight, although Kaman would retain his W.K.A. title.
| 1991-11-23 | Win | (England) Kevin Morton | | Marseille, France | Decision (Unanimous) | 12 | | 66-3-1 |
Retains I.S.K.A. Light Heavyweight World title.
| 1991-10-25 | Win | (Germany) Klaus Nonnemacher | Thriller from Paris II | Paris, France | TKO | 8 | | 65-3-1 |
| 1991-03-? | Win | (France) Michel Mangeot | | Marseille, France | TKO | 4 | | 64-3-1 |
Retains I.S.K.A. Light Heavyweight World title.
| 1990-12-17 | Win | (United States) Yediah Judah | | Montreal, Quebec, Canada | TKO | 6 | | 63-3-1 |
| 1990-12-11 | Win | (United States) Mark Longo | | Quebec City, Quebec, Canada | Decision (Unanimous) | 12 | | 62-3-1 |
| 1990-02-20 | Win | (United States) Andy Mayo | | Montreal, Quebec, Canada | KO | 4 | | 61-3-1 |
| 1989-12-12 | Win | (United States) William Knorr | | Montreal, Quebec, Canada | KO | 4 | | 60-3-1 |
| 1989-04-21 | Win | (Netherlands) Ernesto Hoost | | Geneva, Switzerland | Decision (Split) | 12 | | 59-3-1 |
| 1988-06-03 | Win | (United States) Bob Thurman | | Le Havre, France | KO | 3 | 1:37 | 58-3-1 |
Wins I.S.K.A. Light Heavyweight World title.
| 1987-11-? | Win | (United States) Larry McFadden | | Montreal, Quebec, Canada | KO | 2 | | 57-3-1 |
| 1987-05-? | Win | (United States) C.L. Bergeron | | Montreal, Quebec, Canada | KO | 1 | | 56-3-1 |
| 1986-12-14 | Win | (Netherlands) Ernesto Hoost | | Montreal, Quebec, Canada | Decision (Unanimous) | 12 | | 55-3-1 |
| 1986-09-? | Win | Richard Green | | Montreal, Quebec, Canada | KO | 4 | | 54-3-1 |
| 1986-04-26 | Win | (United States) Bob Thurman | Karatemania | Atlanta, Georgia, United States | TKO (Doctor Stoppage) | 4 | | 53-3-1 |
Retains P.K.A. Middleweight World title.
| 1986-02-? | Win | (United States) Bob Handegan | | Atlanta, Georgia, United States | KO | 1 | | 52-3-1 |
| 1985-10-12 | Win | (United States) Paul Madison | | Denver, Colorado, United States | KO | 5 | | 51-3-1 |
| 1985-07-? | Win | (United States) C.L. Bergeron | | Moncton, New Brunswick, Canada | KO | 4 | | 50-3-1 |
| 1985-05-01 | Win | (United States) Andy Brewer | | Hull, Quebec, Canada | KO | 1 | | 49-3-1 |
| 1985-02-? | Win | (United States) Bret Zwierzynski | | Sainte-Brigide-d'Iberville, Quebec, Canada | KO | 2 | | 48-3-1 |
| 1984-12-18 | Draw | (United States) Don Wilson | | Montreal, Quebec, Canada | Decision Draw | 12 | | 47-3-1 |
| 1984-10-30 | Win | (United States) Bob Handigan | | Hull, Quebec, Canada | KO | 3 | | 47-3 |
| 1984-10-? | Win | Virgil Myers | | Moncton, New Brunswick, Canada | KO | 1 | | 46-3 |
| 1984-09-? | Win | Gary Cicciolletti | | Montreal, Quebec, Canada | KO | 1 | | 45-3 |
| 1984-06-? | Win | Lonnie Grady | | Montreal, Quebec, Canada | KO | 4 | | 44-3 |
| 1984-04-10 | Win | (United States) Rodney Batiste | | Montreal, Quebec, Canada | KO | 7 | | 43-3 |
| 1984-01-? | Win | (United States) Paul Ford | | New York City, New York, United States | KO | 6 | | 42-3 |
| 1983-12-20 | Win | (United States) Leroy Hopkins | | Montreal, Quebec, Canada | TKO | 9 | | 41-3 |
| 1983-11-? | Win | (United States) Larry McFadden | | Montreal, Quebec, Canada | KO | 3 | | 40-3 |
| 1983-09-? | Win | David James | | Hull, Quebec, Canada | KO | 1 | | 39-3 |
| 1983-09-? | Win | Steve Wright | | Quebec City, Quebec, Canada | KO | 3 | | 38-3 |
| 1983-08-23 | Win | (United States) Wade Woodbury | | Montreal, Quebec, Canada | Decision (Split) | | | 37-3 |
| 1983-06-28 | Win | (United States) Roosevelt Moss | | Montreal, Quebec, Canada | KO | | | 36-3 |
| 1983-05-11 | Win | (United States) Don Setzer | | Montreal, Quebec, Canada | KO | | | 35-3 |
| 1983-03-? | Win | Junior Bowden | | Montreal, Quebec, Canada | KO | | | 34-3 |
| 1983-01-? | Win | (United States) Steve Mackey | | Toronto, Ontario, Canada | KO | | | 33-3 |
| 1982-11-17 | Win | (United States) Kerry Roop | | Montreal, Quebec, Canada | TKO | | | 32-3 |
Retains P.K.A. Middleweight World title.
| 1982-10-? | Win | (United States) Bernard Clark | | London, Ontario, Canada | TKO | | | 31-3 |
| 1982-09-? | Win | (United States) Tommy Richardson | | Ottawa, Ontario, Canada | TKO | | | 30-3 |
| 1982-06-? | Win | (United States) Maurice Moore | | Montreal, Quebec, Canada | KO | | | 29-3 |
| 1982-04-25 | Win | (United States) Andy Brewer | | Montreal, Quebec, Canada | KO | | | 28-3 |
| 1982-03-? | Win | Ron Scott | | Ottawa, Ontario, Canada | TKO | | | 27-3 |
| 1982-02-? | Win | (United States) Mark Zacharatos | | Windsor, Ontario, Canada | KO | | | 26-3 |
| 1982-01-26 | Win | (United States) Jarvis Gardner | | Montreal, Quebec, Canada | KO | | | 25-3 |
| 1981-11-17 | Win | (Canada) Eddie Durant | | Ottawa, Ontario, Canada | TKO | | | 24-3 |
| 1981-04-25 | Win | (United States) Rodney Baliste | | Ottawa, Ontario, Canada | KO | | | 23-3 |
Retains P.K.A. Middleweight World title.
| 1981-02-24 | Win | Glenn McMorris | | Ottawa, Ontario, Canada | KO (body shot) | | | 22-3 |
| 1980-11-15 | Win | (United States) Robert Biggs | | Ottawa, Ontario, Canada | TKO | | | 21-3 |
Wins P.K.A. Middleweight World title.
| 1980-08-11 | Win | (United States) Larry Poore | | Ottawa, Ontario, Canada | KO | | | 20-3 |
| 1980-07-17 | Win | (United States) Emilio Navarez | | Boston, Massachusetts, United States | KO | | | 19-3 |
| 1980-04-19 | Win | (United States) Ron Thiveridge | | Ottawa, Ontario, Canada | KO | | | 18-3 |
| 1980-03-? | Win | (United States) Jeff White | | Detroit, Michigan, United States | KO | | | 17-3 |
| 1979-11-? | Loss | (Canada) Ralph Hollet | | Halifax, Nova Scotia, Canada | Decision (Split) | | | 16-3 |
| 1979-11-? | Win | (United States) Doug Ware | | Boston, Massachusetts, United States | KO | 1 | | 16-2 |
| 1979-10-19 | Win | (United States) Doug Ware | | Ottawa, Ontario, Canada | KO | 1 | | 15-2 |
| 1979-07-? | Win | (United States) Ace Lewis | | Boston, Massachusetts, United States | KO | | | 14-2 |
| 1979-06-09 | Win | (United States) Emilio Navarez | | Kitchener, Ontario, Canada | KO | 7 | | 13-2 |
| 1979-05-02 | Loss | (United States) Blinky Rodriguez | | Lake Tahoe, Nevada, United States | KO (Left Hook) | 1 | | 12-2 |
| 1979-04-? | Win | (United States) Kerry Roop | | Ottawa, Ontario, Canada | KO | | | 12-1 |
| 1978-11-07 | Win | (Canada) Ralph Hollett | | Ottawa, Ontario, Canada | KO | | | 11-1 |
| 1978-10-? | Win | (United States) Kerry Roop | | Windsor, Ontario, Canada | Decision (Unanimous) | | | 10-1 |
| 1978-05-? | Win | (Canada) Robby Warchief | | Sorel-Tracy, Quebec, Canada | Corner Stoppage | 4 | | 9-1 |
| 1978-03-? | Win | Fritz Matthiews | | Kitchener, Ontario, Canada | TKO | | | 8-1 |
| 1978-03-? | Win | (United States) Mike Chapman | | Ottawa, Ontario, Canada | KO | | | 7-1 |
| 1977-11-? | Win | (United States) Victor Hale | | Rochester, New York, United States | TKO | | | 6-1 |
| 1977-10-? | Win | (United States) Carl Beamon | | Buffalo, New York, United States | Decision (Unanimous) | | | 5-1 |
| 1977-10-? | Win | Mark Kosicki | | Ottawa, Ontario, Canada | KO | | | 4-1 |
| 1977-09-? | Win | (United States) Roger Hurd | | Toronto, Ontario, Canada | TKO | | | 3-1 |
| 1977-08-? | Win | (United States) James Louth | | Rochester, New York, United States | TKO | | | 2-1 |
| 1977-04-? | Loss | (Scotland) Murray Sutherland | | Ottawa, Ontario, Canada | TKO | | | 1-1 |
| 1976-06-? | Win | (Canada) Serge Simard | | Ottawa, Ontario, Canada | TKO | 1 | | 1-0 |
Legend: Win Loss Draw/No contest Notes

== Publications ==
Jean-Yves Thériault with coauthor Joseph Jennings wrote a 214-page book called Full-contact Karate, published by Contemporary Books in 1983.

- Full-contact Karate (Google Books)
  - ISBN 0-8092-5597-9
  - ISBN 978-0-8092-5597-9
