= Red Sun Rising (film) =

1994 film directed by Francis Megahy

- Original key art
- Directed by: Francis Megahy
- Screenplay by: Robert Easter
- Story by: Robert Easter; Neva Friedenn; Paul Maslak
- Produced by: Paul Maslak; Neva Friedenn
- Starring: Don Wilson; James Lew; Terry Farrell; Mako; Michael Ironside
- Cinematography: John Newby
- Edited by: John Weidner
- Music by: John Coda
- Production company: Maslak/Friedenn Films
- Distributed by: Imperial Entertainment
- Release date: September 1, 1994; (U.S.)
- Running time: 99 minutes
- Country: United States
- Language: English
- Budget: $2 million

Red Sun Rising is a 1994 American martial arts action film directed by Francis Megahy and starring Don "The Dragon" Wilson, James Lew, Terry Farrell, Mako, Michael Ironside and Edward Albert. Wilson plays a Japanese cop who travels to Los Angeles and teams up with a reluctant American counterpart (Farrell) to track down the gang responsible for the murder of his partner, whose hitman (Lew) is an expert in the ancient art of the death touch. The full title, as it appears on the title card, is Red Sun Rising: Based on the Legend of the Death Touch.

Widely regarded as a step up in class compared to Wilson's bread-and-butter work for producers such as Roger Corman, it is held as his best film by many reviewers and by the actor himself.

== Plot synopsis ==
Kyoto detective Thomas Hoshino is left to suffer when his partner is killed by the deadly Jaho and the local police look down on him for being a hafu. With a desire for vengeance, Hoshino follows Jaho's trail to Los Angeles, California, as the LAPD prepare to question Yamata for his own criminal actions in the country. However, Jaho is already in LA, reigniting a gang war between two street gangs and helping a Yakuza boss escape police custody. Paired up with an LAPD detective with an irrational hatred of Japanese people, and a former Shinto priest who runs a business in the area, Hoshino must help the detective defuse rising tensions and defeat Jaho before he becomes too powerful.

== Cast ==
- Don "The Dragon" Wilson as Thomas Hoshino
- Terry Farrell as Karen Ryder
- Mako as Buntoro Iga
- James Lew as Jaho
- Michael Ironside as Captain Meisler
- Soon-Tek Oh as Yamata
- Edward Albert as Decklin
- Stoney Jackson as Gamal
- Yuji Okumoto as Yuji
- Jim Hatch as Ray
- Forry Smith as Steve
- Peter Vasquez as Hector
- Jacqueline Obradors as Rita
- Leonard O. Turner as Councilman Royce
- Toshishiro Obata as Oyabun
- Ken Davitian as Cab Driver
- Art Camacho as Malito Lieutenant
- Steve Burton as Barfly

== Production ==
=== Development ===
The impetus for the film came from Don Wilson and friend Chris Penn's desire to work together again. Wilson brought the project to Paul Maslak, editor of Inside Kung Fu and his manager of four years. Maslak and Neva Friedenn, a veteran martial arts film distributor and PR, had co-produced Wilson's previous vehicle Out for Blood with PM Entertainment, and the pair was now looking to branch out into production full time. Red Sun Rising would be the first project of their new outfit Maslak/Friedenn Films. Executive producer Ashok Amritraj was not involved in the creative phase and joined the film later. He kept a hands off approach but helped them get the best possible cast for their budget, and was crucial to the film's financing, notably securing favorable terms on their completion bond thanks to his proven track record.

British director Francis Megahy was recommended for the project by his agent, who was also a personal friend. It was his American feature debut. He had shot his share of fisticuffs on the 1988 Pierce Brosnan vehicle Taffin, but never such intricately choreographed martial arts. He was happy to delegate oversight of those scenes to Maslak, Wilson and their fight coordinator of choice, Art Camacho. He was given a batch of tapes to pick a cinematographer, and chose Jim Newby, who was the producers' preferred option. Newby came to the project with his wife, first assistant director Erica Fox. Editor John Weidner was picked by Maslak, and returned from Out for Blood and Ring of Fire.

=== Writing ===
The basic pitch, which came from Penn, was for a "reverse Black Rain" where a Japanese cop traveled to the U.S. and allied with a begrudging local officer. Ever since learning that the current Japanese police descended from reformed samurai, Maslak had wanted to retell their ancestral rivalry against the ninja in the context of a modern cop film. Maslak and Penn's ideas were merged to form the basis of Red Sun Rising. Robert Easter, the companion of producer Neva Friedenn, was tasked with fleshing out the premise into a full screenplay. The family name of Wilson's character, Hoshino, is his Japanese mother's maiden name. When Penn departed the project, Maslak suggested making the American sidekick a woman to add romantic depth to their relationship, although her dialogue relating to the main plot was left largely unchanged.

Maslak added the concept of the dim mak ('death touch'), which is more Chinese than Japanese, to the story due to the sheer narrative possibilities it offered. While the death touch is largely regarded as a folk belief, and Wilson acknowledges it as fictional, Camacho insists that some lethal punching techniques do exist. However, what is shown in the film was invented by him and James Lew. In the original script, Jaho was strictly a violent figure who beat up everybody, women included, and did not display the ambiguous seductiveness seen in James Lew's eventual portrayal.

=== Casting ===
Chris Penn, who was originally going to co-star as the American cop, dragged his feet to sign his contract after he was cast in True Romance, and confessed to Wilson that his agent had asked him to refrain from participating in lower-budget films. Ashok Amritraj recommended Terry Farrell as his female replacement. Michael Ironside took the role of Farrell's superior as a favor, when mutual friend Steve James contacted him on Wilson's behalf. The Canadian veteran was still compensated to the tune of $10,000 per day.

For main antagonist Jaho, Amritraj initially suggested Jet Li—who was not yet widely known in the U.S.—but he was not available. Despite having already played a number of parts, James Lew received an "introducing" credit to signify his first role as a main antagonist. He was friends with Wilson and the publisher of Inside Kung Fu, as well as a student of acting coach Ivana Chubbuck, who had previously mentored Maslak. It was Chubbuck who suggested that he wear colored contact lenses for the role.

According to Wilson, he had to enforce his creative control clause over both Farrell and Lew's casting, against the opinion of Maslak, who favored more stereotypical looks. This led to the severing of the two men's relationship after the film. Maslak, however, presented their breakup as the natural byproduct of his decision to expand his horizons as a producer.

=== Filming ===
Red Sun Rising was budgeted at $2 million. Photography took place between June 14 and July 10, 1993. The film was shot in the Los Angeles area, and production used a studio located inside the former Queen of Angels Hospital. The Kyoto-set prologue was shot at the Japanese Garden of the Donald C. Tillman Water Reclamation Plant in Van Nuys, another popular filming location. The film employed close to 80 stunt persons. Among those working on it behind the scenes was Gerry Blanck, a Floridian acquaintance of the Wilson brothers and fellow kickboxing champion. Michael Ironside experienced a serious scare on his way to the set when he rolled over his Mercedes-Benz, but escaped unscathed. Wilson also battled through an illness during the shoot.

== Release ==
=== Pre-release ===
During production, a theatrical release was considered for November or December 1993, although the odds were always tipped in favor of a video release. To promote the film, Inside Kung Fu, the magazine where the film's principals worked, ran a cover story in the November 1994 issue of its spinoff publication Martial Arts Movies, hailing it as "The Motion Picture Born Inside the Pages of Inside Kung Fu". It also contained an interview of Don Wilson by Timothy Baker.

=== Television ===
In the U.S., Red Sun Rising premiered on premium cable channel HBO on September 1, 1994, as part of their "HBO World Premiere" lineup, whose name Maslak had helped to coin. The film was a success, scoring a 2.3 national rating and ranking as the 4th most watched pay cable program of the week in the country. According to Maslak, it was the highest rated HBO World Premiere of the year.

=== Home video ===
The term "World Premiere" employed by HBO was only loosely defined, and the film had in fact already appeared in some international markets such as the U.K., where it arrived on VHS through distributor Guild Home Video on August 12, 1994. In the U.S., the film came to home video courtesy of Imperial Entertainment on April 11, 1995, apparently delayed from a March 28 date. It reached Canada shortly before on March 21. Image Entertainment also released a LaserDisc version on May 17, 1995.

On September 27, 2022, film preservationists Vinegar Syndrome re-issued the film on a Blu-ray struck from a new master, with specially commissioned special features and further bonus material drawn from an earlier German pressing.

=== Festivals ===
Red Sun Rising received a 10th anniversary screening at the Temecula Valley International Film & Music Festival on September 13, 2003, in presence of leading man Wilson and director Megahy.

== Reception ==
Red Sun Rising has received positive reviews. Writing for News Publications' TV Guide and Motion Picture Annual, Brian Camp said: "While still a low-budget potboiler with a far-fetched story line, Red Sun Rising is far superior to most similar efforts, including Roger Corman’s ongoing series of Bloodfist films." He deemed that "the film benefits from tight direction and editing". Wilson's acting was said to have "gradually improved to the point of adequacy", while Farrell combined "a sense of humor and a warm, feminine side" and Lew made for "an imposing and formidable villain". The BBC's Radio Times rated the film three stars and said: "There were high hopes at one point in the nineties that Don 'The Dragon' Wilson could cross over into the mainstream. [...] Sadly he faded from sight but this remains one of his stronger efforts, boasting a better-than-average script that still finds room for astonishing martial arts sequences." Writing in his syndicated Video view column, British reviewer Peter Dean wrote that the film "[has] got a better-than-average screenplay and the action sequences are well choreographed." Anne Wheeler, home video columnist for magazine Hit Parader, was most positive and simply hailed Red Sun Rising as "the best American martial arts film ever made", with particular mention for Lew's villainous turn.

In his examination of director Francis Megahy's career for the compendium Directors in British and Irish Cinema, Robert Murphy was more moderate, calling it "an enjoyable if routine Japanese martial arts vehicle for Don 'The Dragon' Wilson". Ballantine Books' Video Movie Guide was along the same lines, assessing that "[e]ntertaining players rise above pedestrian material in this modest martial arts saga, starring the always appealing Don 'The Dragon' Wilson [...] Mystical elements are played too broadly, but the formula still works."
