= Marek Piotrowski =

Polish kickboxer and boxer

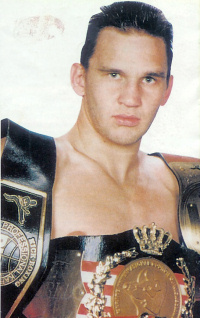
- Marek Piotrowski
- Born: 14 August 1964 (age 62); Dębe Wielkie, Poland
- Other names: The Punisher
- Nationality: Polish
- Height: 1.87 m (6 ft 2 in)
- Weight: 85 kg (187 lb; 13.4 st)
- Division: Middleweight; Light Heavyweight; Cruiserweight; Heavyweight
- Style: Boxing, Kickboxing, Kyokushin Karate
- Fighting out of: Chicago, Illinois, U.S.
- Rank: black belt in Kyokushin; Green belt in Jujutsu
- Years active: 1984–1996

Professional boxing record
- Total: 21
- Wins: 21
- By knockout: 11
- Losses: 0

Kickboxing record
- Total: 44
- Wins: 42
- By knockout: 27
- Losses: 2

Other information
- Boxing record from BoxRec

Marek "The Punisher" Piotrowski (born 14 August 1964) is a Polish retired heavyweight kickboxer and boxer. He is a former ten time kickboxing world champion.

== Amateur career ==
=== Amateur career ===
At around the age of 13 or 14, Piotrowski studied jujutsu achieving green belt before becoming interested in Kyokushin karate when he was at age of 18. In 1984 (in under 25 years old class) he won the Polish Juniors karate championship, following this up the next year by winning the Polish Senior championship. He became a karate black belt 1st dan in July 1993. His official karate record is 13 fights, with 13 victories.

At the beginning of 1987, Piotrowski began to focus on kickboxing, in particular, full-contact, which was prohibited in Poland at the time. On 11 October 1987 he entered the 81 kg category of the 6th W.A.K.O. World Championships, a tournament for amateur kickboxers, held in Munich, Germany. Piotrowski won the competition defeating Hungarian Károly Halász in the final. Later that year he entered and won the Full Contact Kickboxing World Cup '87 in Budapest, Hungary and also won the Polish national kickboxing title. He had several more fights in 1988 in Poland and Europe, amassing a 17-0 amateur kickboxing record.

== Professional career ==
=== Professional career ===
In 1988 Piotrowski decided to leave Poland for the USA where he was determined to become a professional world champion, something he was unable to do in his own country due to the Communist-era rules on professionalism. He had his first professional fight in Rockford, Illinois in October 1988 against Bob Handegan whom he defeated via knockout in the 4th round. On 19 August 1989, in his fifth fight on American soil, Piotrowski sent shockwaves through the kickboxing community by outworking the reigning national champion Rick "The Jet" Roufus in a 10th round unanimous decision win. Piotrowski took Roufus's P.K.C. middleweight U.S belt.

As a result of his upset victory over Roufus, Piotrowski had his world title shot against the legendary Don "The Dragon" Wilson. On 4 November 1989, in Chicago, Illinois he defeated Wilson and took his belts, becoming the world champion of the P.K.C. and F.F.K.A kickboxing organizations, while Wilson had to vacate his I.S.K.A. world title due to the loss (which Marek did not gain due to it not being an I.S.K.A. sanctioned event). As a result of his victories over two world class fighters, Piotrowski earned the nickname "The Punisher".

Throughout 1990 and 1991 he fought six more bouts, adding more championships to his collection by defeating Bob 'The Thunder' Thurman to win the K.I.C.K. Intercontinental title in Las Vegas, Nevada and Mark Longo to win the K.I.C.K. in Los Angeles, California. His kickboxing record now stood at 29 wins to 0 defeats (19 coming via knockout) and he held four professional world titles.

On 22 June 1991 in Chicago Piotrowski put his P.K.C. title on the line in a re-match against Rick Roufus while the vacant I.S.K.A. world title was also up for grabs. Piotrowski was not in the best condition for the fight, as ongoing personal problems hampered his preparation and he was defeated, suffering a heavy 2nd-round knockout from a high kick that left him unconscious on the canvas. After suffering his first ever defeat, Piotrowski needed time to recuperate and did not fight for the rest of the year.

In 1992 Piotrowski decided to enter professional boxing, winning his debut against Keith Williams on 8 February by technical knockout in the 4th round. Despite starting his boxing career, Piotrowski still wanted to recover his lost titles and fought several kickboxing bouts, winning all of them. In July 1992 he fought the Canadian Conrad Pla for the I.S.K.A. North American title, defeating him by 10th-round decision. After dismantling another opponent via 3rd round K.O. in Las Vegas, Piotrowski was ready for the opportunity to regain one of his world titles.

In Paris, France on 11 November 1992 the North American I.S.K.A. champion met the W.K.A. Junior Light Heavyweight champion and legendary Dutchman Rob Kaman (also known as 'Mr Low-Kick', 98 wins, 78 K.O.s) for a shot at the I.S.K.A. World title, fought under Oriental Rules (this formula allowing low kicks). Unfortunately for Piotrowski he lost by technical knockout in a very dramatic fight - Kaman's renowned low kicks getting the better of him in the 7th round.

On 22 June 1993 he travelled to Montreal, Canada where he took on future K-1 fighter Michael "The Black Sniper" McDonald. Piotrowski won the fight by technical knockout in the 11th round, winning the W.A.K.O. Pro Full Contact World title, adding the professional W.A.K.O. title to the amateur one he had won back in 1987. Later that year he defeated Mike Winkeljohn by 8th-round decision, finally getting his hands back on the I.S.K.A. (Oriental Rules version) World title belt.

In 1994 Piotrowski won two more titles. In February he defeated Roy McCown to win the little-known T.B.C world title, while on 15 March he defeated Javier Mendez in San Jose, California to win the I.S.K.A. (Full Contact) World title. By the end of the year he was progressively becoming less focused on kickboxing and more on boxing, going 4 and 0.

In December 1995 he returned to Poland for his last kickboxing fight. In Kraków he defeated Italian Stefano Tomiazzo, winning the W.K.A. World title. He finished his kickboxing career with a record of 44 fights, with 42 victories to just 2 defeats and had been an eight-time professional world champion with seven different organizations; W.K.A., I.S.K.A., P.K.C, T.B.C., F.F.K.A, K.I.C.K. and W.A.K.O. pro, as well as holding two amateur world titles.

After retiring from kickboxing Piotrowski continued his boxing career. Between 1992 and 1996, he fought in 21 fights and won all of them. He finished his career on 13 December 1996 in Hannover, Germany, defeating Greg Lavely on points. In 1997 he was offered to fight for a professional championship for the I.B.F. belt, but he had to refuse due to health problems. Piotrowski returned to live in Poland in 2002.

== Titles ==
Professional

- 1995 W.K.A. Full Contact Heavyweight World champion
- 1994 I.S.K.A. Full Contact Light Heavyweight World champion
- 1994 T.B.C. Full Contact World champion
- 1993 I.S.K.A. Oriental Rules Light Heavyweight World champion
- 1993 W.A.K.O. Pro Full-Contact Light Heavyweight World champion
- 1991 I.S.K.A. Full Contact Light Heavyweight North American champion
- 1990 K.I.C.K. Light Heavyweight World champion
- 1990 K.I.C.K. Light Heavyweight Intercontinental champion
- 1989 P.K.C. Full Contact Light Heavyweight World champion
- 1989 F.F.K.A. Full Contact Light Heavyweight World champion
- 1989 P.K.C. Full-Contact Middleweight United States champion

Amateur

- 1987 Poland Full-Contact Kickboxing champion
- 1987 Full contact Kickboxing World Cup '87 (gold)
- 1987 W.A.K.O. World Championships in Munich (gold) -81 kg (Full-Contact)
- 1985 Poland Senior Karate Championship (gold)
- 1984 Poland Junior Karate Championship (gold)

== Other recognitions ==
=== Recognitions ===
Sources:

- In 1987 Piotrowski gained 'The Siren' award from the Sportowiec magazine from being the best Polish sport discovery of the year.
- On three occasions he was placed in the top ten of the best Polish sportsmen of the year in the Przeglad Sportowy ranking (1988, 1989, 1990), twice coming runner up.
- The 'Fighter' magazine voted Piotrowski second in their 'Best Kickboxers of the 1980s', -172 pound (78 kg) category.
- On two occasions he was recognised by American experts as 'Kickboxer of the Year' (1989 and 1994).
- He was also chosen by the American press as one of the best fighters of the 1990s.
- In 1991 Aleksander Bilik published the book 'Kickboxer', which described Piotrowski's career up until 1990.
- In 2005 a documentary about Piotrowski called 'The Warrior' was filmed.
- Also in 2005 there was the comic strip 'the Kickboxer' based on Marek Piotrowski published in the Polish publication Gazeta Wyborcza.
- In 2006 Piotrowski received the Stanley Honour - Kickboxing award.

== Kickboxing record ==
Professioanl Kickboxing Record
42 wins (27 (T)KOs, 15 Decisions), 2 Losses
Date	Result	Opponent	Event	Location	Method	Round	Time	Record
1995-12-?	Win	(Italy) Steffano Tomiazzo		Katowice, Poland	Decision	12		42-2
Wins W.K.A. Full Contact Heavyweight World title.
1995-05-?	Win	(United States) William Thompson		Clearwater, Florida, USA	KO	2		41-2
1994-07-?	Win	(United States) Cecil Simms		Chicago, Illinois, USA	KO	4		40-2
1994-04-15	Win	(United States) Javier Mendez		San Jose, California, USA	Decision	12		39-2
Wins I.S.K.A. Full Contact Light Heavyweight World title.
1994	Win	(United States) Gary Jones		Katowice, Poland	KO	3		38-2
1994-02-?	Win	(United States) Roy McCown		Chicago, Illinois, USA	KO	6		37-2
Wins T.B.C. Full Contact World title.
1993-11-?	Win	(United States) Mike Winkeljohn		Chicago, Illinois, USA	Decision	8	2:00	36-2
Wins I.S.K.A. Oriental Rules Light Heavyweight World title.
1993-06-22	Win	(Canada) Michael McDonald	P.K.A. Karatemania 6	Montreal, Canada	TKO	11		35-2
Wins W.A.K.O. Pro Full Contact Light Heavyweight World title.
1993-04-?	Win	(United States) Troy Hughes		Chicago, Illinois, USA	Decision	7	2:00	34-2
1992-11-21	Loss	(Netherlands) Rob Kaman		Paris, France	TKO	7		33-2
Fight was for vacant I.S.K.A. Oriental Rules Light Heavyweight World title.
1992-09-?	Win	(Commonwealth of Independent States) Sergei Parkomienko		Las Vegas, Nevada, USA	KO	3		33-1
1992-07-?	Win	(Canada) Conrad Pla		Chicago, Illinois, USA	Decision	10	2:00	32-1
Wins I.S.K.A. Full Contact Light Heavyweight North American title.
1992-05-?	Win	(United States) John Cronk		Detroit, Michigan, USA	KO	4		31-1
1992-04-?	Win	(United States) Derrell Banks		Chicago, Illinois, USA	KO	4		30-1
1991-06-22	Loss	(United States) Rick Roufus		Chicago, Illinois, USA	KO (High Kick)	2		29-1
Fight was for vacant I.S.K.A. Full Contact Light Heavyweight World title and Marek's P.K.C. Full Contact Light Heavyweight World title.
1991-03-?	Win	(United States) Robert Tooley		Chicago, Illinois, USA	KO	4		29-0
1990-10-?	Win	(United States) Andy Brewer		Chicago, Illinois, USA	KO	4		28-0
1990-08-06	Win	(United States) Mark Longo		Lake Tahoe, USA	Decision	12	2:00	27-0
Wins K.I.C.K Full Contact Light Heavyweight World title.
1990-07-05	Win	(United States) Tommy Richardson		Las Vegas, Nevada, USA	KO	4		26-0
1990-05-?	Win	(United States) Jim Maurina		Chicago, Illinois, USA	KO	4		25-0
1990-04-?	Win	(United States) Bob Thurman		Los Angeles, California, USA	KO	7		24-0
Wins K.I.C.K Full Contact Light Heavyweight Intercontinental title.
1989-11-04	Win	(United States) Don Wilson	F.F.K.A. & P.K.C. Event	Chicago, Illinois, USA	Decision (Split)	12	2:00	23-0
Wins vacant F.F.K.A. and P.K.C. Full-Contact Light Heavyweight World titles.
1989-08-19	Win	(United States) Rick Roufus		Chicago, Illinois, USA	Decision (Unanimous)	10	2:00	22-0
Wins Roufus's P.K.C. Middleweight U.S title.
1989-06-?	Win	(United States) Larry McFadden		Chicago, Illinois, USA	Decision	10	2:00	21-0
1989-03-?	Win	(United States) Lowell Nash		Chicago, Illinois, USA	TKO	6		20-0
1988-12-?	Win	(United States) Neil Singleton		Chicago, Illinois, USA	TKO	4		19-0
1988-10-?	Win	(United States) Bob Handegan		Rockford, Illinois, USA	KO	4		18-0
Legend: Win Loss Draw/No contest Notes

Amateur Kickboxing Record
Date	Result	Opponent	Event	Location	Method	Round	Time	Record
1988-06-?	Win	(Poland) Józef Warchoł		Koszalin, Poland	Decision	5		17-0
1988-06-?	Win	(Hungary) Zoltán Németh		Warsaw, Poland	KO	1		16-0
1988-05-?	Win	Zoran Tariba		Cologne, Germany	KO	2		15-0
1988-04-?	Win	(Hungary) Zoltán Németh		Komló, Hungary				14-0
1988-04-?	Win	(United States) Stefan Pellegrino		Komló, Hungary	Decision			13-0
1987-12-?	Win	(Poland) Andrzej First		Kraków, Poland				12-0
Wins Polish Kickboxing title.
1987-12-?	Win	(Hungary) Lajos Hugyetz	Full Contact Kickboxing World Cup '87, Final	Budapest, Hungary				11-0
Wins Full Contact Kickboxing World Cup '87 title.
1987-12-?	Win	Stefan Lyung	Full Contact Kickboxing World Cup '87, Semi Finals	Budapest, Hungary				10-0
1987-12-?	Win	Pascal Bitafol	Full Contact Kickboxing World Cup '87, Quarter Finals	Budapest, Hungary				9-0
1987-10-11	Win	(Hungary) Károly Halász	W.A.K.O. World Championships 1987, Full Contact Final -81 kg	Munich, West Germany				8-0
Wins W.A.K.O. Full Contact World Championship gold medal -81 kg .
1987-10-11	Win	(Greece) Sokrates Karaites	W.A.K.O. World Championships 1987, Full Contact Semi Final -81 kg	Munich, West Germany				7-0
1987-10-11	Win	(United States) Rudy Smedley	W.A.K.O. World Championships 1987, Full Contact Quarter Final -81 kg	Munich, West Germany				6-0
1987-10-11	Win	(Austria) Gunter Singer	W.A.K.O. World Championships 1987, Full Contact 1st Round -81 kg	Munich, West Germany				5-0
	Win	(Poland) Andrzej First		Kraków, Poland				4-0
	Win	(Poland) Andrew Zwycięstwto		Kraków, Poland				3-0
	Win	(Poland) Cezary Nazar		Warsaw, Poland				2-0
	Win	(Poland) Tomasz Pisowodzki		Warsaw, Poland				1-0
Legend: Win Loss Draw/No contest Notes
