= CyberTracker (film) =

- Directed by: Richard Pepin
- Written by: Jacobsen Hart
- Produced by: Joseph Merhi; Richard Pepin
- Starring: Don 'The Dragon' Wilson
- Cinematography: Ken Blakey
- Edited by: Chris Maybach; Chris Worland
- Music by: Lisa Popeil; Bill Montei
- Distributed by: PM Entertainment Group
- Release date: June 1, 1994
- Running time: 91 minutes
- Country: United States
- Language: English

CyberTracker is a 1994 American science fiction action film written by Jacobsen Hart and directed by Richard Pepin. It stars Don 'The Dragon' Wilson with Richard Norton, Stacie Foster, Steve Burton, Abby Dalton and Jim Maniaci.

The film was followed by a 1995 direct-to-video sequel, CyberTracker 2, also starring Wilson, Foster, Burton and Maniaci.

== Plot ==
In the future, the United States government partners with Cybercore Industries to institute the Computerized Judicial System, which uses computers to determine the guilt of accused criminals, then carries out the sentence using cyborg executioners called Trackers (Jim Maniaci). Eric Anthony Phillips (Don "The Dragon" Wilson) is the head of the United States Secret Service detail assigned to Senator Bob Dilly (John Aprea), a champion of the Computerized Judicial System. Phillips thwarts an assassination attempt on Dilly by agents of the Union for Human Rights (UHR), an anti-Cybercore terrorist cell, and earns Dilly's favor, to the chagrin of his veteran security head, Ross (Richard Norton).

Dilly decides to invite Phillips into his inner circle, and tests his loyalty by bringing him to the execution of a spy caught inside Cybercore. Phillips refuses to cooperate and fights his way out from the execution site. Dilly and Ross, conspiring with Police Chief Olson (Abby Dalton) and Cybercore president J. Craig Rounds (Joseph Ruskin), send a Tracker to kill him. Phillips destroys the Tracker and is found by the UHR, who are led by television journalist Connie Griffith (Stacie Foster) and disavow the attempt on Dilly's life.

Griffith recruits Phillips for an infiltration mission into Cybercore, with the goal of obtaining files on "Operation Echo." A second Tracker attacks the UHR base, killing most of their members, though Phillips and Griffith manage to kill it with a rocket launcher. At Cybercore, they narrowly evade security and obtain a disk with Operation Echo's data, but are soon caught by Ross and brought to Rounds. They escape custody, and Phillips battles Ross throughout the facility; Olson initializes a third Tracker before Griffith shoots her. Phillips kills Ross and barely manages to defeat the Tracker with a grenade.

The next day, Phillips infiltrates Dilly's press conference and shoots him, publicly revealing that he is a cyborg, used by Cybercore to subvert society as part of Operation Echo. This, along with everything else uncovered by the UHR, causes the Computerized Judicial System to be shut down and Cybercore to collapse.

Griffith presents a report on the collapse of Cybercore and its aftermath, and goes on a tropical vacation with Phillips. Rounds, having gone into hiding following his company's collapse, is found by a Tracker sent by Griffith to target him.

== Cast ==
- Don "The Dragon" Wilson as Eric Phillips
- Richard Norton as Ross
- Stacie Foster as Connie
- Joseph Ruskin as J. Craig Round/"Rounds"
- John Aprea as Senator Bob Dilly
- Abby Dalton as Chief Olson
- Steve Burton as Jared
- David Barnathan as Marcus
- Edward Blanchard as Gil
- Lisa Larosa as Ally
- Christina Zilber as Kate (credited as Christina Naify)
- Duchess Dale as Becca
- G. William Keith as Moderator
- Peter Kluge as Reporter
- Dana Sparks as Stephanie
- Kevin Carr as Cooley
- Joel Weiss as Grubb
- Thomas Rosales Jr. as Man With Gun In Club (uncredited)
- Jim Maniaci as The Trackers

== Production ==
Production company PM Entertainment said that by the 1990s, action film fans were demanding higher budgets from independent films. To compensate, the company hired less expensive talent to star in them. PM Entertainment budgeted these films at $1.5–5 million. The scenes of the futuristic police headquarters were filmed at the Tillman Water Reclamation Plant in Van Nuys, California.

== Reception ==
TV Guide rated it 2/4 stars and called it a Terminator knock-off with a better script than the typical low budget action film. In his science fiction film guide Outer Limits, author Howard Hughes wrote that the film has "some impressive explosions and car crashes", but the sets look "suspiciously like 1990s Los Angeles".
