= Warren Burton =

American actor (1944–2017)

- Born: October 23, 1944; Chicago, Illinois, U.S
- Died: October 2, 2017 (aged 72); United States
- Occupation: Actor

Warren Burton (October 23, 1944 – October 2, 2017) was an American actor. During the late 1970s and throughout the 1990s, he was seen on several daytime soap operas, usually in villainous roles.

Burton was born and raised in Chicago, Illinois, and attended Roosevelt High School and the Art Institute of Chicago. He began his acting career in Chicago theatre before moving to New York to pursue a career there. He appeared in a number of Broadway and Off-Broadway theatre productions such as Gypsy and Hair.

He played the role of Eddie Dorrance #3 on All My Children from 1978 to 1979 and won a Daytime Emmy for Outstanding Supporting Actor at the 1980 awards broadcast. Other daytime roles included Jason Dunlap on Another World (1980–82); Warren Andrews on Guiding Light (1983–87); Phillip Hamilton on Santa Barbara (1988–89) and Dr. Hepler on The Bold And the Beautiful (1995). He appeared in the made-for-TV movie The Girl Most Likely to... in 1973. Burton portrayed Confederate general Henry Heth in the 1993 film Gettysburg.

Since the late 1990s, Burton was a voice actor for numerous video games, including the Jak and Daxter series, Prince of Persia: The Sands of Time, Psychonauts, Age of Mythology, Battlezone II: Combat Commander, and Nox, among several others.

== Filmography ==
=== Film ===
Year	Title	Role	Notes
1976	Baby Blue Marine	Second Serviceman	
1977	Chatterbox	TV Reporter	
1977	The World's Greatest Lover	Ludwig	
1978	Rabbit Test	First Secret Service Man	
1978	Jokes My Folks Never Told Me		
1992	Poison Ivy	Max	
1993	Bodies, Rest & Motion	Radio Preacher	Voice
1993	Gettysburg	Maj. Gen. Henry Heth	
1996	2090	Wilson	
1996	Bloodfist VIII: Trained to Kill	Michael Powell	
1997	Strategic Command	Colpart	
2011	Green Lantern	First Guardian	

=== Television ===
Year	Title	Role	Notes
1989	Freddy's Nightmares	Dennis	Episode: "Photo Finish"
1990	Tales from the Crypt	Roland	Episode: "Television Terror"
2014	Review	King of the Orgy	Episode: "Road Rage; Orgy"

=== Video games ===
Year	Title	Role	Notes
1996	Phantasmagoria 2: A Puzzle of Flesh	Paul Allen Warner	
1997	Betrayal in Antara	Finch, Krrrflak, Birge	
1997	Blade Runner	Runciter, Tyrell Guard	
1997	Lands of Lore: Guardians of Destiny	Baccata	
1999	Lands of Lore III	Eric LeGre, Finch Boris	
1999	Wu-Tang: Shaolin Style	Mong Zhu	
1999	Battlezone II: Combat Commander	Kossieh	
2000	Nox	Aldwyn, Mine Worker 2, Morgan	
2001	Jak and Daxter: The Precursor Legacy	Samos the Sage	
2002	Age of Mythology	Brokk, Skult	
2003	Jak II	Samos the Sage	
2003	Prince of Persia: The Sands of Time	King Sharaman	
2004	Jak 3	Samos the Sage	
2005	Psychonauts	St. Bernard	
2005	Jak X: Combat Racing	Samos the Sage	
2006	Daxter	Samos the Sage	
2011	Rango	Beans' Daddy	
2016	Edge of Nowhere	Captain Simon Edwards	Final role
