= Unstoppable (2004 film) =

- Official DVD cover
- Directed by: David Carson
- Written by: Tom Vaughan
- Produced by: Boaz Davidson; Tom Jacobson; Bob Misiorowski; Jim Wedaa
- Starring: Wesley Snipes; Jacqueline Obradors; Stuart Wilson; Kim Coates
- Cinematography: Ward Russell
- Edited by: David Jakubovic; Alain Jakubowicz; Jeremy Presner
- Music by: Louis Febre
- Production company: Millennium Films
- Distributed by: Columbia TriStar Home Entertainment
- Release date: October 30, 2004
- Running time: 96 minutes
- Country: United States
- Language: English
- Budget: $20 Million

Unstoppable is a 2004 American action film directed by David Carson, and written by Tom Vaughn. The film stars Wesley Snipes, Jacqueline Obradors, Stuart Wilson, and Kim Coates. The film was released in the United States on October 30, 2004.

== Plot ==
A former CIA agent and ex-Special Forces member Dean Cage (Wesley Snipes), is in a rehab program, haunted by a botched mission in Bosnia which resulted in the execution of his best friend Scott (Cristian Solimeno). While in a restaurant waiting for his girlfriend, Baltimore Police Detective Amy Knight (Jacqueline Obradors), who happens to be Scott's sister, he is mistakenly believed to be a CIA agent involved with a stolen military experimental truth serum. He is abducted by the real thieves and injected with the drug, which makes him relive the moments from the failed Bosnian mission and not able to discern who are his allies and who are his enemies. Amy has six hours to find the antidote and save Dean's life.

== Cast ==
The cast for the film is as follows:

- Wesley Snipes as Agent Dean Cage
- Jacqueline Obradors as Detective Amy Knight
- Stuart Wilson as Alex Sullivan
- Kim Coates as Peterson
- Mark A. Sheppard as Leitch
- Adewale Akinnuoye-Agbaje as Agent Junod
- Vincent Riotta as Detective Jay Miller
- David Schofield as Dr. Collins
- Nicholas Aaron as McNab
- Kim Thomson as Agent Kennedy
- Jo Stone-Fewings as Agent Gabriel
- Cristian Solimeno as Scott Knight
- Gary Oliver as Sullivan's Driver
- Andrew Pleavin as Cherney
- Raicho Vasilev as St. Nevis Guard #1
- David Fleeshman as St. Nevis Guard #2
- Velizar Binev as The Buyer
- Asen Blatechki as Sniper

== Production ==
=== Filming ===
Unstoppable was filmed in Bulgaria and Los Angeles, California in 42 days on March 2 and April 13, 2003.

== Music ==
The credit song is the hiphop track "Move" by Leroy and Denoyd.

== Release ==
=== Home media ===
DVD was released in Region 1 in the United States on November 23, 2004, and also Region 2 in the United Kingdom on 24 January 2005, it was distributed by Columbia TriStar Home Entertainment.

== Reception ==
=== Critical response ===
Pablo Villaca gave the film two stars out of five writing for Cinema em Cema. The Action Elite reviewed the film, and also gave it 2/5, commenting that it lacked "any memorable action scenes".
