= Jacqueline Obradors =

American actress (born 1966)

- Born: October 6, 1966 (age 59)
- Occupation: Actress
- Years active: 1990–present
- Known for: NYPD Blue; Tortilla Soup; Six Days, Seven Nights

Jacqueline Obradors (born October 6, 1966) is an American actress. She has appeared in films such as Six Days, Seven Nights (1998), Deuce Bigalow: Male Gigolo (1999), Tortilla Soup (2001), A Man Apart (2003) and Unstoppable (2004). She is also the voice of Audrey Rocio Ramirez in Atlantis: The Lost Empire. On television, Obradors is known for her role as Detective Rita Ortiz in the ABC crime drama series NYPD Blue (2001–2005).

== Career ==
Obradors began her career with starring in the action films Red Sun Rising (1994) and Soldier Boyz (1995). On television, she guest-starred on Parker Lewis Can't Lose; Diagnosis: Murder; Murder, She Wrote and The John Larroquette Show. She appeared in Problem Child 3: Junior in Love (1995), a made-for-television movie and the third and final installment of the Problem Child trilogy. In 1998, Obradors co-starred in the box-office hit action-adventure comedy film Six Days, Seven Nights. The following year, she appeared in the comedy film Deuce Bigalow: Male Gigolo. In 2000, she was a regular cast member in the short-lived sitcom Battery Park.

In 2001, Obradors played the leading role in the comedy-drama film Tortilla Soup. The film received positive reviews from critics. Obradors voiced Audrey Ramirez in the Disney film Atlantis: The Lost Empire (2001) and its sequel, Atlantis: Milo's Return (2003), and co-starred in the action films A Man Apart (2003) playing Stacy Vetter, the murdered wife of Vin Diesel's character DEA Agent Sean Vetter, and Unstoppable (2004). She appeared in one episode of George Lopez as Angie's sister, Gloria. Also in 2001, she moved to television for the regular role of detective Rita Ortiz in the ABC police drama series, NYPD Blue. She stayed in the show until the series finale in 2005. Later in 2005, she took the series regular role on the NBC sitcom Freddie as Sofia, Freddie's sister. The series was canceled after one season in 2006.

Obradors took a break after Freddie. In 2009, she appeared in the crime film Crossing Over starring Harrison Ford and the following year had a recurring role of Paloma Reynosa in the CBS series, NCIS. She guest-starred on The Secret Life of the American Teenager, Franklin & Bash, Grimm, Castle, and Lucifer. She starred in the original pilot for the FX crime drama series, Mayans M.C. as a matriarch of the Reyes family and EZ's mother, but was cut-off during the creative reasons. She had a recurring roles on the TV Land sitcom Lopez in 2016, the Amazon Studios crime drama Bosch (2019–21), and the Freeform mystery thriller The Watchful Eye in 2023. She appeared in the romantic comedy film Palm Springs in 2020, and in 2023 co-starred in the miniseries Daisy Jones & the Six.

== Filmography ==
Year	Title	Role	Notes
1994	Red Sun Rising	Rita	
1995	Soldier Boyz	Vasquez	
1997	The People	Dee Ramon	
1998	Six Days, Seven Nights	Angelica	Nominated - Blockbuster Entertainment Award for Favorite Supporting Actress - Comedy/Romance
1999	Deuce Bigalow: Male Gigolo	Elaine Fowler	
2001	Tortilla Soup	Carmen Naranjo	Nominated - ALMA Award for Outstanding Actress in a Motion Picture
2001	Atlantis: The Lost Empire	Audrey Ramirez	Voice
2003	A Man Apart	Stacy Vetter	
2003	Atlantis: Milo's Return	Audrey Ramirez, Nurse	Voice, direct-to-video
2004	Unstoppable	Detective Amy Knight	
2009	Crossing Over	Special Agent Phadkar	
2014	Bad Asses	Rosaria Parkes	
2019	Windows on the World	Margot	
2020	Palm Springs	Pia Wilder	
2022	Catwoman: Hunted	La Dama	Voice, direct-to-video
2025	Dora and the Search for Sol Dorado	Mango	Voice

=== Television ===
Year	Title	Role	Notes
1990–1993	Parker Lewis		
1995	Live Shot	Sonya Lopez	(uncredited)
1995	Diagnosis Murder	Anita	Episode: "My Baby Is Out of This World"
1995	Problem Child 3: Junior in Love	Conchita	Television film
1996	Murder She Wrote	Patricia Decalde	Episode: "Death Goes Double Platinum"
1996	The John Larroquette Show	Myra	Episode: "The Train Wreck"
1996	Sliders	Carol	Episode: "Season's Greedings"
1996–1997	The Burning Zone	Marion (uncredited)	
1997	Silk Stalkings	Maria Martine	Episode: "Silent Witness"
1992–1997	Renegade	Teresa Romero	Episode: "Sawed-off Shotgun Wedding"
1998	L.A. Doctors	Autumn	
1999–2000	Jesse	Irma	
2000	Battery Park	Elena Ramirez	
2000–2006	Strong Medicine	Dolores Rivera (uncredited)	
2001	Kate Brasher	Mary Elizabeth Rodriguez	
2001	Some of My Best Friends	Michelle	
2001–2005	NYPD Blue	Detective Rita Ortiz	80 episodes Nominated—ALMA Award for Outstanding Supporting Actress in a Television Series
2003	George Lopez	Gloria Palmero	Episode: "A Kiss Is Just a Kiss"
2005–2006	Freddie	Sofia	Series regular
2009	Cold Case	Dr. Julie Ramirez (uncredited)	Episode: "Mind Games"
2010	NCIS	Paloma Reynosa	3 episodes
2010–2022	Curious George	Cecilia	
2011	The Glades	Marisol Sanchez	Episode: "Dirty Little Secrets"
2012, 2019	Young Justice	Alanna	Voice, 2 episodes
2014	Grimm	Ava Diaz	Episode: "Cry Luison"
2015	Castle	Allison Hyde	Episode: "XX"
2016	Lopez	Alita	4 episodes
2018	The Last Ship	Clinic Doctor	Episode: "Tropic of Cancer"
2018	Mayans M.C.	Marisol Reyes	Episode: Pilot
2019–2021	Bosch	Detective Christina Vega	Recurring role: Season 5–7 (24 episodes)
2023	Daisy Jones & the Six	Lucia	2 episodes
2023	Bosch: Legacy	Detective Christina Vega	2 episodes
2023	Frasier	Siobhan	Episode: "Blind Date"
2024	Grey's Anatomy	Valerie Cardenas	Recurring role: Season 20 (3 episodes)
2024	The Cleaning Lady	Teresa Morales	Recurring role: Season 3 (3 episodes)
2025	Tracker	Sheriff Walcott	Episode: "Nightingale"

=== Audio books ===
Year	Title	Role
2015	Rain of the Ghosts	Marina Cortez
