= Bloodfist VIII: Trained to Kill =

- Official DVD cover
- Directed by: Rick Jacobson
- Written by: Alex Simon
- Starring: Don Wilson; John Patrick White; Jillian McWhirter
- Production company: Hollywood Road Films
- Distributed by: New Concorde
- Release date: 1996
- Running time: 85 minutes
- Country: United States
- Language: English

Bloodfist VIII: Trained to Kill (though later released as Bloodfist VIII: Hard Way Out) is a 1996 American action film directed by Rick Jacobson and starring Don "The Dragon" Wilson, John Patrick White, Jillian McWhirter, and Warren Burton. It was written by Alex Simon. It is the Final Bloodfist movie in name only to star Don "The Dragon" Wilson. A sequel to Bloodfist VII: Manhunt (1995), it is the eighth installment in the Bloodfist film series.

== Plot ==
Widower Rick Cowan (Don "The Dragon" Wilson) is a high school teacher and a pretty dull guy, at least to his rebellious 15-year-old son Chris (John Patrick White).

Chris is having problems with a few of the bullies in school. Just when it looks like he’s given in to their demands and is handing over his sweet 90’s CD boombox to a bully, it turns out that he rigged it to electrocute the bully.

And then assassins try to kill Rick and Chris. It turns out the reason for Rick's long absences during Chris's childhood was his secret work as overseas CIA operative George Macready. Chris had never known any of it, but he learns that his mother knew, and she fell victim to a bomb that was meant for Rick.

One of Rick's missions had led to the assassination of an Italian politician named Michaelangelo Leone, and now it appears that Italy is striking back. Rick thought he had covered his tracks, but now it looks like someone has seen through the CIA’s charade, and Rick and Chris have been marked for death by a hit squad.

Rick and Chris flee to Ireland, home of the Major (Richard Farrell), a retired spy that Cowan can still trust. The Major discovers that the Italians are just hirelings, employed by Rick's old Company boss, Michael Powell (Warren Burton), to eliminate witnesses to his own involvement in corruption.

When Powell kidnaps Chris, Rick sets out to rescue Chris, and make Powell pay.

== Cast ==
- Don "The Dragon" Wilson as Rick Cowan / George "Mac" MacReady
- John Patrick White as Chris Cowan
- Jillian McWhirter as Danielle Mendelsohn
- Warren Burton as Michael Powell
- Donnie Hair as Emeric Pressburger
- Richard Farrell as Major
- John McHugh as Terry O'Leary
- Conor Nolan as Carlo Gianini
- Brendan Murray as Stanton
- Mike O'Mahoney as McGrath
- Liam Silke as Bernard
- Margaret Mangan as Marilyn
- Bebhinn Kelly as Debbie
- Shawn Brewster as Nick Bartoll
- Carl Milinac as Bryan Flannaghan
- Mary Monahan as Gail
- Sean O'Brien as John Brady
- Brian Walsh as The Principal
- Frank Barrett as The Bartender
- Michelle Conway as Secretary
