= Tillman Water Reclamation Plant =

Facility in Los Angeles, California

Coordinates: 34.182°N 118.479°W

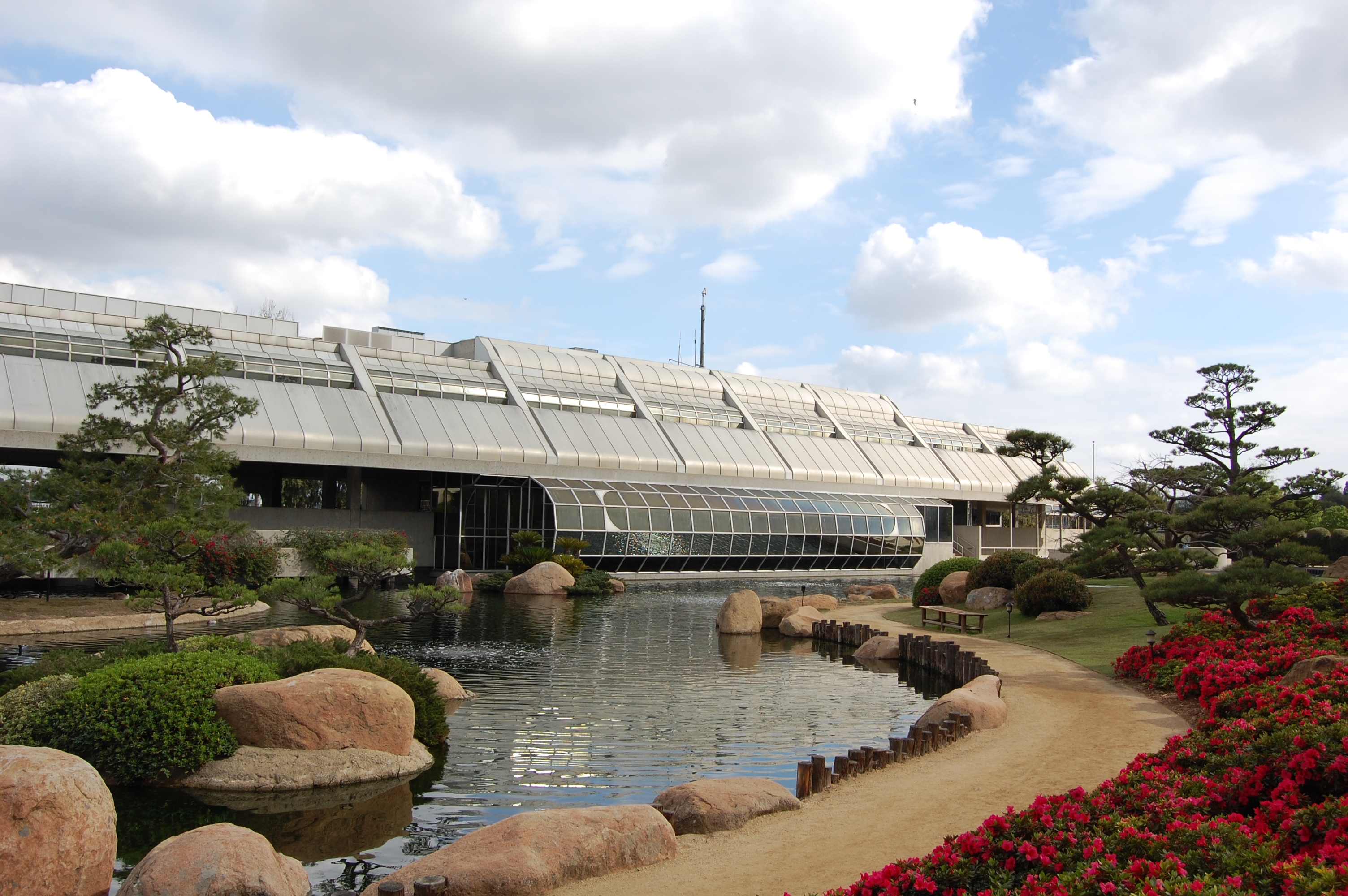
The Japanese Garden and administration building at the Donald C. Tillman Water Reclamation Plant

The Donald C. Tillman Water Reclamation Plant is a water reclamation plant located in Van Nuys, Los Angeles, California, within the Sepulveda Flood Control Basin. The plant was conceived of, designed, and constructed by the City of Los Angeles' Bureau of Engineering. The Administration Building was designed by California architect Anthony J. Lumsden.

== Operations ==
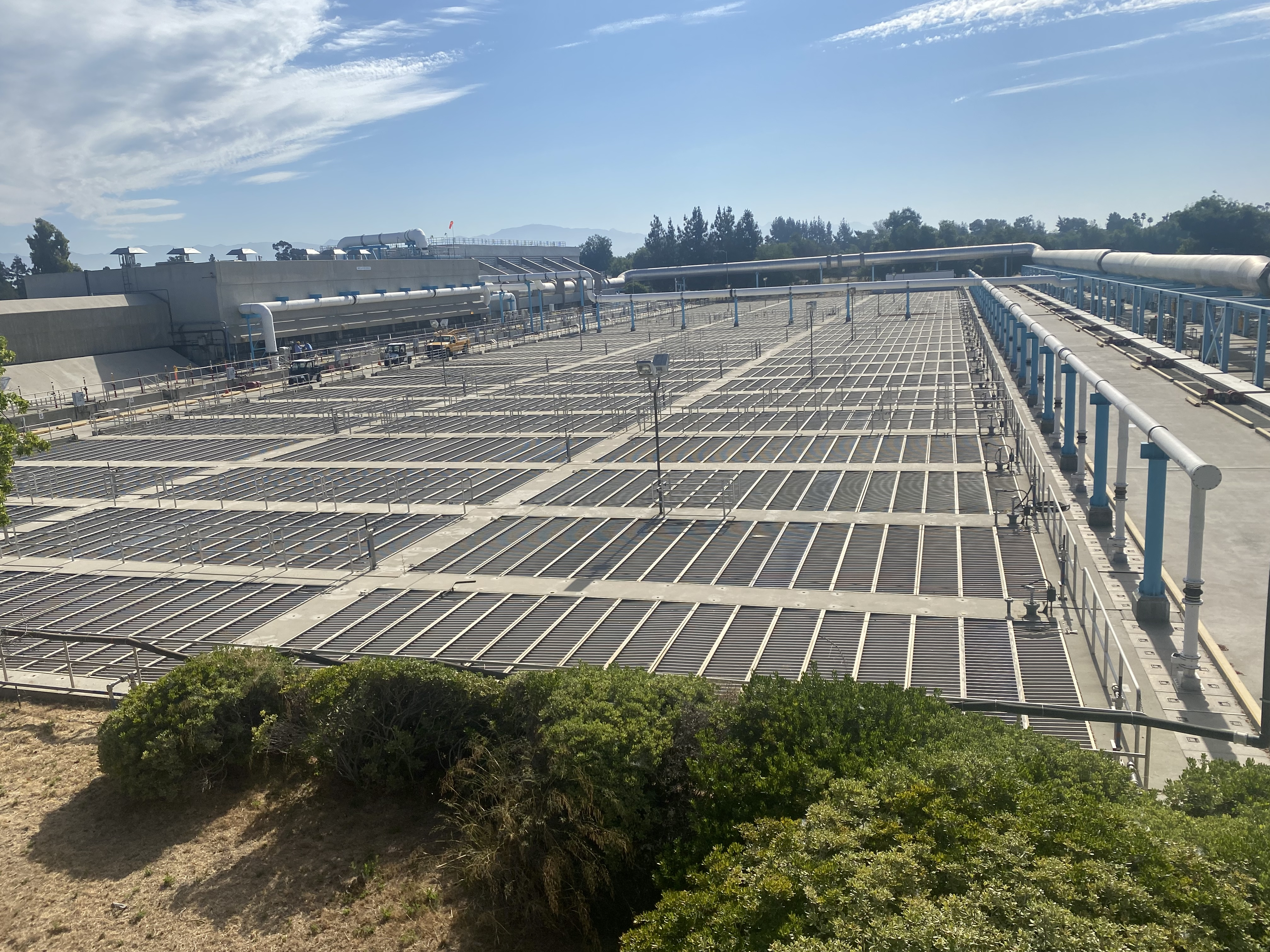
Tillman Water Reclamation Plant sewage tanks

The facility treats and reclaims wastewater by removing it from the sewer system and reducing the need for large sewer pipes downstream from the plant. The treated water is discharged to the lake in the adjacent Balboa Park and then flows into the Los Angeles River, where it comprises the majority of the flow. The plant began operation in 1985 and processes 80 million US gallons (300,000 m^{3}) of waste a day, producing 26 million US gallons (98,000 m^{3}) of recycled water. It is named after Donald C. Tillman, city engineer from 1972 to 1980.

A project to expand the plant's wastewater treatment capacity by building new facilities is expected to begin in late 2024. The 740-million dollar project is expected to increase the facility's ability to purify wastewater by about 20 millions gallons per day, enough to supply an estimated 250,000 people per day with drinking water. The new facilities are expected to start service in 2027. The purified water from the facility is planned to be pumped to the nearby Hansen Spreading Grounds to replenish groundwater supplies, then it will be pumped, re-tested and delivered to local taps. This would mark the first time Los Angeles uses treated, recycled waste water as drinking water. The city currently imports 90% of its water from regional sources, and pumps its treated wastewater into the Los Angeles River. The new facilities are part of the larger Pure Water Los Angeles project to recycle 100% of the city's wastewater by 2035.

== Japanese garden ==
The grounds include a 6.5-acre Japanese garden, conceived by Los Angeles city engineer Donald C. Tillman to mitigate public opposition to a sewage treatment plant in the area. The garden was designed by landscape architect Koichi Kawana and opened in 1984.

== Appearances in media ==
The gardens and administration building have been used as the setting for many commercials, television series, and films, particularly low-budget science-fiction and action films. In the 1990s, Los Angeles mayor Richard Riordan mandated that city facilities be made available at much lower cost than similar locations to benefit the entertainment industry in the city. The administration building portrayed a neuroscience institute in Brain Dead (1990), a Japanese corporate headquarters in Rising Sun (1993), a futuristic police headquarters in CyberTracker (1994), and a spoof of the experimental Biosphere 2 in Bio-Dome (1996). Other productions filmed at the plant include Baywatch Nights, Matlock, Murder, She Wrote, Power Rangers, and Star Trek.
