= Glenn McMorris =

American martial artist

- Born: Glenn McMorris; Baton Rouge, Louisiana
- Nationality: American
- Weight: 75 kg (165 lb)
- Division: Middleweight, Lightheavyweight
- Style: Kickboxing, Karate
- Fighting out of: New Orleans, Louisiana
- Rank: Black Belt

Kickboxing record
- Total: 19
- Wins: 10
- By knockout: 9
- Losses: 9
- By knockout: 7

Other information
- Occupation: Kickboxer, Karate Point-Fighter

Glenn McMorris was an American retired kickboxer, a former Professional Karate Association Full-Contact Middleweight United States Champion, a sport karate Hall of Famer, and the only fighter to have knocked out Martial Arts Hall of Famer Don "The Dragon" Wilson. McMorris died on November 21, 2019.

== Sport Karate ==
Glenn McMorris started in martial arts competition in sport karate. He fought in numerous point-fighting matches which earned him a place in the Sport Karate Hall of Fame. One of McMorris's rare defeats in point-fighting was to Harold "Nature Boy" Roth in New Orleans in 1975. McMorris was the 1976 International Shotokan Karate Federation heavyweight kumite champion.

McMorris appeared on the cover of the magazine Karate Illustrated in July 1979 (Vol.10, Number 7).

== Kickboxing ==
McMorris branched off into kickboxing. He had an early reputation in the WSMAC (World Series of the Martial Arts Championships) as a knockout artist; knocking out "Big" Macon Taylor in 15 seconds. McMorris possessed a great right hand, but he didn't have much of a defense.

McMorris was billed as the number 1 contender for the Professional Karate Association (PKA) Middleweight U.S. Title in March 1980.

McMorris challenged Don "The Dragon" Wilson for the PKA Full-Contact Middleweight U.S. Title on 5 March 1980. McMorris had a record of 9–6 (8 knockouts) going into the title fight, while Wilson was 25-3-1 and was riding a 2-year, 17 bout winning streak. McMorris scored a stunning upset by knocking out Wilson in the first round to capture the title. This would be the only knockout defeat suffered by Wilson in his 6-decade career.

Four months later, McMorris lost the PKA Full-Contact Middleweight U.S. Title to Ray McCallum by 2nd-round knockout.

Next, McMorris attempted a comeback and was knocked out by Robert Biggs.

On 24 February 1981, McMorris met PKA World Lightheavyweight Champion Jean-Yves Theriault in a non-title match. In a brutal slugfest, McMorris lost by knockout in the 6th round. McMorris retired after this bout.

== Kickboxing record ==
Result	Record	Opponent	Weight	Method	Date	Round	Time	Event	Location	Notes
Win	7-6-0	(United States) Coleman Johnson	168 lbs.	KO	1979	1	0:14		New Orleans, Louisiana	
Win	8-6-0	(United States) Emile "Big Macon" Taylor	168 lbs.	KO	1979	1	0:17		New Orleans, Louisiana	
Win	9-6-0	(United States) Bice Milford	168 lbs.	TKO	1980 Jan.	1	1:03		New Orleans, Louisiana	
Win	10-6-0	(United States) Don Wilson	168 lbs.	TKO	1980 Mar 5	1		P.K.A. Full-Contact Middleweight U.S. Title	West Palm Beach, Florida	Won P.K.A. Full-Contact Middleweight U.S. Title
Loss	10-7-0	(United States) Ray McCallum	168 lbs.	KO	1980 Jul	2		P.K.A. Full-Contact Middleweight U.S. Title		Lost P.K.A. Full-Contact Middleweight U.S. Title
Loss	10-8-0	(United States) Robert Biggs	168 lbs.	KO	1980 Nov	2	1:36		Clearwater, Florida, USA	
Loss	10-9-0	(Canada) Jean-Yves Theriault	178 lbs.	KO	1981 Feb 24	6		Non-Title Match	Ottawa, Ontario, Canada	

== Karate Point Fighting record ==
Result	Record	Opponent	Method	Date	Round	Time	Event	Location	Notes
Draw		(United States) John Keating	188 lbs.	Draw	1970	3		New Orleans, Louisiana	
Win		(United States) Jimmy Tabares		PTS	1975 Jul	1		Houston, Texas	Source:Black Belt Magazine July 1975.
Unavailable		(United States) Louis Arnold			1975				Source:Black Belt Magazine July 1975.
Loss		(United States) Harold "Nature Boy" Roth	168 lbs.	PTS	1975	3		New Orleans, Louisiana	
Unavailable		(United States) Ernest Smith			1976			Galveston, Texas	Source: Black Belt Magazine July 1976.

== Full-Contact Karate Record ==
Result	Record	Opponent	Method	Date	Round	Time	Event	Location	Notes
Unavailable		(United States) Burnis White	160 lbs.		1976 Oct 1		Tommy Lee promoter	Aloha, Hawaii, Braisdell Memorial Arena	Source:
