= Rodney Batiste =

American karateka (born 1953)

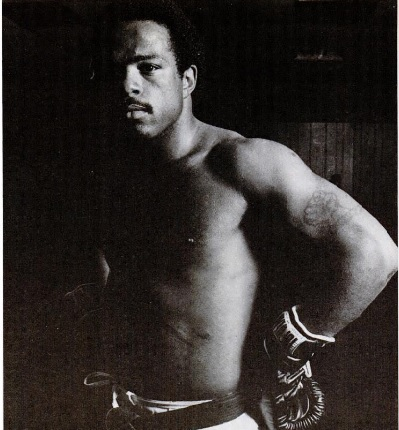
Rodney Batiste before his World Title Fight

Rodney Batiste (born 1953) is an American karateka. He has also studied the taekwondo system of Jhoon Goo Rhee.

== Biography ==
Batiste grew up in Brooklyn and attended George W. Wingate High School. Batiste began his study of martial arts when he was 15, initially as a means of improving his street-fighting. He later joined the United States Army, and after being honorably discharged, Batiste decided to become a professional fighter. After turning professional, he initially believed that karate would oust boxing as the United States' combat sport of choice.

In 1977 he became the National Karate Association's world champion, and by 1982 was the U.S. Middleweight champion by defeating Jimmy Horsely, who at the time had eighteen professional fights and had never lost a round.

Batiste moved into public speaking and writing, in the mid-eighties. He was contracted by Marion Barry, then Mayor of Washington, D.C., to tour the city as part of its “Roving Leaders” program giving seminars and lectures in each of its wards to youth about how to use focused attention, perseverance, self-discipline and a strong work ethic to obtain a stated goal.

By 1988, with the help of his wife who was attacked in a restroom in her early twenties, Batiste developed a system of self-defense that anyone could use regardless of age, sex, or athleticism to remove themselves from dangerous situations without the use of a weapon. He named his system E.S.C.A.P.E. Strategies (Easy System of Control And Practical Emergency Strategies).

Batiste lectured to law firms, government agencies, and accounting firms including, Navy Federal Credit Union, Department of Interior, the Department of Justice, the Environmental Protection Agency and the World Bank. Batiste was contracted to lead seminars and lectures for agents of the Federal Judiciary Centers. His primary audience consisted of Judges, Pretrial Clerks, and U. S. Marshals. After entering her house during a home invasion, Congresswoman Jane Harmon hired Batiste to train her and her husband in self-defense.

In the 1990s, Batiste opened his own dojo (WCRB Karate) in Arlington, VA.

Batiste has written two books: 20 Years to Suicide, A Father Looks Back (ISBN 9781606041178) and Dagpaw Means Success (ISBN 9780692057025), published by Tate Publishing & Enterprises.
