= Karate International Council of Kickboxing =

Governing body of sport kickboxing

- Abbreviation: KICK
- Formation: 1982
- Headquarters: United States
- Location: St. Louis, Missouri, United States
- Region served: Worldwide
- Official language: English
- Executive: Frank Babcock
- Website: http://kickinternational.org

The Karate International Council of Kickboxing (KICK) was a sanctioning body that regulates kickboxing matches. It is considered among the more prestigious organizations that sanction professional kickboxing.

KICK was organized in 1982 by Frank Babcock, Fred Wren, Larry Caster, Bob Wall and Roy Kurban, with martial arts icon Chuck Norris serving as a goodwill ambassador. It grew into one of the largest kickboxing organizations of the 1980s.

== See also ==
- List of male kickboxers
- List of female kickboxers
