= Benny Urquidez =

American kickboxer and martial artist

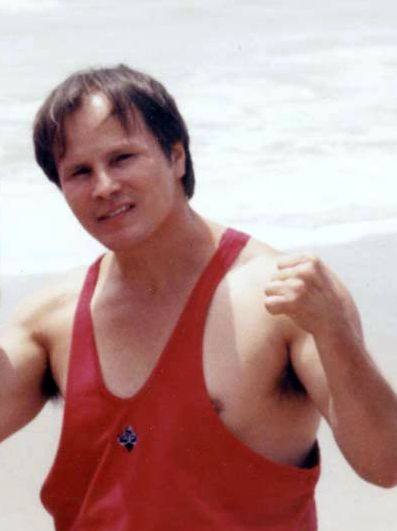
- Urquidez in 1998
- Born: June 20, 1952 (age 74); Tarzana, California, U.S.
- Other names: The Jet
- Height: 5 ft 6 in (1.68 m)
- Weight: 145 lb (66 kg; 10.4 st)
- Division: Lightweight; Super Lightweight; Welterweight
- Style: American Kenpo, Shotokan, Taekwondo, Boxing, Judo, Jujutsu, Brazilian Jiu-jitsu, Kajukenbo, Lima Lama, White Crane Kung Fu, Aikido, and founder of Ukidokan Kickboxing
- Fighting out of: Los Angeles, California, United States
- Team: The Jet Center
- Years active: 1974–1985, 1989, 1993

Kickboxing record
- Total: 67
- Wins: 63
- By knockout: 57
- Losses: 1
- Draws: 1
- No contests: 2

Other information
- Notable students: Pete Cunningham; John Cusack; Louis Gossett Jr; Michael Keaton; Stan Longinidis; Duff McKagan; Dave Mustaine; Richard Norton; David Lee Roth; Patrick Swayze

Benny Urquidez (born June 20, 1952) is an American former professional kickboxer, martial arts choreographer and actor. Nicknamed "The Jet", Urquidez was a non-contact karate competitor who later pioneered full-contact fighting in the United States. He made the transition from point to full-contact karate in 1974, the year of its inception in the US, frequently fighting in bouts where the rules were ambiguous and contrasts in styles were dramatic. Urquidez is also known for once holding the rare achievement of six world titles in five different weight divisions, and remained largely undefeated in his 27-year career. His only loss came in a Muay Thai match which was shrouded in controversy, as Urquidez had only agreed to a no-decision exhibition, a clause that was ignored when the fight was over.

Between 1974 and 1993, he amassed a documented professional record of 49–1–1 (win-loss-draw) with 35 knockouts and two controversial no-contests, although he is also supposed to have an additional record of 10–0–1 (10 KOs) in undocumented professional fights, making a total of 59–1–2–2 (45 KOs). However, sources vary, with Ratings listing Urquidez as 63–0–1, (57 knockouts) and on his own official webpage, Urquidez lists his fight record as 200–0, and says he was 63–0, with 57 knockouts in title defenses. Also, he claims to have been undefeated in the "Adult Black Belt Division" prior to entering full-contact karate. Black Belt magazine voted Urquidez "Competitor of the Year" in 1978. In 2019, he was inducted into the International Sports Hall of Fame.

He has appeared in occasional acting roles, including the Jackie Chan movies Wheels on Meals (1984) and Dragons Forever (1988), and played a hitman in George Armitage's Grosse Pointe Blank (1997).

== Early life, family and education ==
Urquidez was born in Los Angeles County, California, the son of a wrestling mother and a boxing father. His parents are of Spanish (Basque), Mexican and Blackfoot ancestry. He has said that his father was Spanish and his mother was Native American.

Benny began competing in 1958, at the age of five, in "peewee" boxing and wrestling in Los Angeles. His martial arts instruction started in 1960, when he was seven years old; his first formal teacher was Bill Ryusaki. Urquidez received his black belt at the age of 14 (1966), a highly unusual feat in the 1960s. His siblings also achieved the rank of black belt. His sister Lilly Rodriguez was a pioneer in kickboxing for women, and their late brother Reuben Urquidez appeared with Benny in a documentary on the combination martial art budojujitsu.

== Career ==
At the age of 12, Urquidez attended the Long Beach International Karate Championships in 1964. He witnessed a demonstration by Bruce Lee, including the one-inch punch which sent a 245-pound man flying back. This demonstration by Lee inspired a young Urqidez to start entering martial arts tournaments.

He entered the point circuit in 1964 and earned a reputation as a colorful fighter. At the 1972 Santa Monica Kenpo Open, Urquidez lost in the finals to Brian Strian. In the 1973 Internationals, he fought John Natividad in what is considered one of the greatest non-contact bouts in history. In an unprecedented 25-point overtime match, Natividad won the match 13–12, receiving the Grand Title and the $2,500 purse. In May 1974, at the PAWAK Tournament, Urquidez lost a 4–1 decision to Joe Lewis. He also competed in England and Belgium as a member of Ed Parker's 1974 US team. Also in 1974, he began his move away from the non-contact style by entering and winning the World Series of Martial Arts Championship, effectively a tough-man contest with few rules. Over the next two decades, he fought under various kickboxing organizations (NKL, WPKO, Professional Karate Association (PKA), World Kickboxing Association (WKA), AJKBA, Shin-Kakutojutsu Federation, NJPW and MTN) to amass a record of 58 wins with no losses. This undefeated record, though official, is controversial and highly disputed.

In 1977, Urquidez traveled to Japan and fought under the WKA's compromise US–Japan rules which included leg kicks and knees to the body. He defeated Katsuyuki Suzuki by KO in the sixth round as part of a professional wrestling event in which Antonio Inoki fought Everett Eddy in what was said to be a wrestler/karate fighter mixed match but was a pre-determined pro wrestling match. The Suzuki fight materialized because the newly formed WKA organization could not compete against the PKA in the US. At the same time, Japanese professional wrestler Antonio Inoki, who gained the worldwide fame by fighting Muhammad Ali in the controversial 1976 boxer/wrestler mixed-match in Japan, had been looking for new opponents for what he called the world martial arts championship series. Eventually, promoter Ron Holmes discovered Everett Eddy for Inoki. By that time, Eddy had been coached by Arnold Urquidez, and lost in a knockout in the 1st round to PKA world heavyweight champion Ross Scott in the previous year. In the same event, Benny Urquidez knocked out Howard Jackson, but soon his lightweight title was stripped by the PKA, and so both Eddy and Urquidez had no action in the US, and had to look for fights overseas. Even though the Inoki/Eddy bout was successful, it was the fight between Urquidez and Suzuki, which shocked Japan, where Japanese kickboxing had been very popular. Though never tested for or achieved any rank in Japanese karate, Urquidez has decided to bestow upon himself the title of sensei, a Japanese honorific term which is given to experts and instructors meaning: "someone who precedes you in knowledge".

The All-Japan Kickboxing Association, for which Suzuki had been rated as No. 2, became interested in the American sport of full-contact karate, decided to promote series of mixed-rules bouts between the American full-contact karate fighters and Japanese kickboxers. On November 14, 1977, the AJKF held the first of such event which featured Urquidez, his brother-in-law Blinky Rodriguez, Marc Costello, Brendan Leddy, Tony Lopez, Leonard Galiza and Freddy Avila. Only Urquidez and Costello came out as the winners for the American team. Urquidez's victory over Kunimitsu Okao convinced the Japanese fight fans, and eventually began to be featured as the central figure for what was supposed to be the documentary comic book, The Square Ring, until he declined to avenge his loss against the Thai opponent Prayout Sittiboonlert. Urquidez's second loss came in August 1980 in Florida. American Billye Jackson dominated seven rounds including knocking Urquidez down. Urquidez protested the decision and petitioned the WKA's Howard Hansen to classify it as a no-contest.

After 1980, Urquidez' ring appearances became less frequent. Between 1981 and 1984 he fought only sporadically. In 1984, he fought Ivan Sprang in Amsterdam under modified Muay Thai rules (no elbows), winning by sixth-round TKO. His ring career largely came to a halt after 1985, and he retired after facing Yoshihisa Tagami at the age of 41. Subsequently, Urquidez became devoted to acting, teaching kickboxing and martial arts choreography. Urquidez's late brother Reuben was also a competitive martial artist and actor; they appeared together in a 1982 training video, World Of Martial Arts, along with Steve Sanders (karate), Chuck Norris and John Saxon. Van Halen lead singer David Lee Roth dedicated the band's hit 1984 song "Jump" to Urquidez, of whom Roth was a student.

In 2000, Urquidez and Emil Farkas founded the Los Angeles Film Fighting Institute, which was one of the first schools of its kind in the United States to teach martial artists the intricacies of stunt work.

Urquidez has had training in nine styles: Judo, Kajukenbo, Shotokan, Taekwondo, Lima Lama, White Crane Kung Fu, Jujutsu, Aikido and American Kenpo. He is the founder of Ukidokan Karate. His style is influenced by Muhammad Ali (boxing), Ralph Castro (Shaolin Kenpo), Gokor Chivichyan (Judo), Al Dacascos (Kajukenbo), Dan Inosanto, Takayuki Kubota (Shotokan), Thomas Carroll (Shotokan), Gene LeBell (Judo), Bruce Lee, Chuck Norris, Mas Oyama, Ed Parker, Steve Sanders, Bill Ryusaki, Mike Stone, Arnold Urquidez, Lily Urquidez Rodriguez, Douglas Wong (Shoalin), and Tadashi Yamashita.

Urquidez founded the Jet Center in 1981. The concept for an upscale dojo came from Urquidez's experience from competing in Japan around 1978, being exposed to facilities like the New Hotel Japan in Akasaka. The center served as a filming location for multiple Hollywood productions, including Split Decisions, Mike Hammer, Hunter, Murder, She Wrote, Scarecrow and Mrs. King, and Jake and the Fatman. The facility closed in 1994 due to extensive damage caused by the Northridge earthquake.

In 1995, he opened the Jets Gym in North Hollywood, California. The Jets Gym in the North Hollywood location closed in 2007, to prepare for new commercial development on the property.

As of 2009, he taught ukidokan kickboxing at Team Karate Center in Woodland Hills, California.

In January 2026, Urquidez indicated on the Joe Rogan Podcast that he plans to open a new gym somewhere in California. The facility will include nine pieces of new equipment and five machines that have never been commercially available. It has been previously mentioned that he has a special friendship with actor/client John Cusack with whom talks of opening up a bigger gym in Santa Monica, targeting former champions as clients and trainers are in the works as Cusack has shown interest in taking part as co-owner.

Today, Urquidez continues to teach privately, and working as a stunt coordinator in the entertainment business. He has also authored various instructional books and videos. In 2024, he announced that a documentary would be made by him, directed by Jennifer Tiexiera.

== Controversies ==
=== Varied fights ===
Benny Urquidez was the first kickboxing champion with an international profile who also operated as a free agent under different rules for different sanctions. Consequently, he fought in several unorthodox match-ups and hotly disputed bouts. In late 1974, in the grand finale of an early mixed martial arts-style tough man contest in Honolulu, Hawaii, a 5 ft 6 in (1.68 m), 145 lb (66 kg) Urquidez decisioned a 6 ft 1 in (1.85 m), 230 lb (100 kg) Dana Goodson after scoring a takedown and pin against Goodson in the third and final round.

A year later, in Detroit, Urquidez was disqualified for knocking out his opponent with a fourth punch under the subsequently-discontinued three-punch rule. The disqualifying referee was the opponent's own karate instructor. The bout was excoriated on network television, prompting state athletic commissions across the United States to become interested in regulating the sport. Chuck Norris' short-lived International Karate League (IKL) and later the STAR System world ratings reversed this outcome.

Another three bouts were eventually ruled no-contests (NC). The first, in Los Angeles on March 12, 1977, was a nine-round NC (WKA) against Thai boxer Narongnoi Kiatbandit as part of the inaugural WKA world title event. Urquidez scored flash-knockdowns against Narongnoi in rounds three and six as well as five legal throws over three other rounds. Narongnoi was warned for illegal knee kicks and groin attacks on four occasions before being assessed with a point deduction in round nine. However, the point deduction came shortly after Narongnoi had scored his sole flash-knockdown which, in turn, provoked a riot among Muay Thai fans in the audience. The audience invaded the ring moments before the final bell. Scores were never collected for round nine. The California State Athletic Commission declared the bout a no-contest.

Next, on April 29, 1978, Urquidez faced his fourth Japanese opponent Shinobu Onuki in Tokyo; the event was co-promoted by the AJKBA and Shin-Kakutojutsu Federation. Eventually, Urquidez executed a throw that dislocated Onuki's shoulder. Initially, because of the throw, Urquidez was given a TKO loss. However, the promoters acknowledged that Urquidez used the throw without knowing it was illegal under Japanese rules; the bout was then scored as a no-contest. Following this unsatisfactory result, the two faced each other again in Las Vegas on January 2, 1980. The fight was aired by NBC, and this time Urquidez knocked out Onuki with a left hook to the body. Later, in October 1981, when the AJKBA merged with the WKA, the WKA transmuted the original Onuki no-contest to a TKO victory for Urquidez because, in fact, Urquidez's fight contract had permitted throws.

Third, Urquidez fought to a seven-round NC (WKA) against Billye Jackson in West Palm Beach, Florida, on August 8, 1980. This non-title fight was first reported as a seven-round decision for Jackson; then was changed to a seven-round technical draw, and then to a no-contest. The WKA waited until March 1986 to unambiguously transmute this outcome owing to uneven glove assignments and a coerced last-minute rule change that unfairly affected Urquidez's performance in an otherwise close bout. Despite multiple attempts to reschedule a rematch to settle the dispute Urquidez refused to fight Jackson. The no-contest status of these fights has been corroborated in print by Paul Maslak (Chief Administrator of the STAR System world ratings). As a side note, the WKA and Star system ratings were owned and operated by Urquidez brother, Arnold.

Meanwhile, on August 2, 1978, Urquidez faced the then fifth-ranked welterweight Thai boxer, Prayout Sittiboonlert, in Tokyo as part of the Shin-Kakutojutsu Organization's first independent event. The rules for the bout included six two-minute rounds, one-minute intervals, and no elbow contact as per agreement with Urquidez. Urquidez lost a heart-stopping decision to the Thai, who controlled the fight with relentless knee attacks and through the masterful use of Thai clinches. Afterward, Urquidez claimed he had been maneuvered into a competitive bout under unaccustomed "new rules" through deliberate misrepresentations. A rematch was set on October 30, 1978, at the Budokan (Martial Arts Hall) as part of the five world championships card for the Shin-Kakutojutsu Organization. However, for unknown reasons, Urquidez canceled the fight on the day of the event. According to one report, Urquidez did travel to Japan, but was unable to recover sufficiently from a high fever which he contracted from an allergic reaction to pain medication being used to treat a lingering left knuckle injury. This sanctioning organization was among several discontinued in 1981 for alleged ties to organized crime. Both the WKA and the STAR world ratings regarded this bout as muay Thai, a separate sport, and did not include it as part of Urquidez's rankings and record count for kickboxing.

After a six-year absence from the Japanese ring, Urquidez agreed to fight an exhibition against Nobuya Asuka on April 24, 1989, at the Tokyo Dome as part of the New Japan Pro-Wrestling event. The rules of the bout were five rounds at two-minutes each, one-minute intervals and without elbow or knee contact to the head. Additionally, it was established that, if the fight went the distance, it would automatically be scored as a draw. The bout did go five rounds without knockout or disqualification and a no-decision was immediately declared.

After another four-year absence on December 4, 1993, in "The Legend's Final Challenge" at the Mirage Resort and Casino in Las Vegas, Nevada, Urquidez fought Japanese champion Yoshihisa Tagami to establish the vacant WKA super welterweight world title. Despite having injured his left wrist in training, Urquidez proceeded with the bout and narrowly defeated his equally aggressive opponent with kicking attacks. Urquidez slipped to the canvas in round two; and Tagami scored a clean flash knockdown in round nine. Neither contestant was ever in serious trouble. The bout ended in a split decision, two judges scoring for Urquidez, one for Tagami.

=== Gracie Challenge ===
In September 1994, Urquidez revealed he had been challenged by Rorion Gracie for a mixed martial arts bout as part of the Gracie Challenge. He claimed to have backed down from the fight, considering it to be just a promotional stunt, due to Rorion demanding to fight for free after having negotiated for a fight purse. In response, in November of the same year, Rorion's brother Royce Gracie challenged Urquidez himself, which Benny rejected on the grounds of being retired.

Months later, Royce Gracie wrote an attack piece printed in Black Belt magazine titled "Message for Urquidez: Actions Speak Louder Than Words" in which he voiced his issues with Urquidez, criticizing Urquidez for not submitting to the Gracies' demands for a fight; Gracie alleged that Rorion had dominated Urquidez in a training bout at Urquidez's Jet Center gym in 1978, taking him down "several times" without being touched. Although Gracie went on to state that "that's how the whole Gracie rivalry with Benny started", he went on to accuse Urquidez of having said he would "help Rorion", but not following through on the offer. He also claimed Urquidez only wanted to fight under kickboxing rules, to lessen the chance of being defeated, and that Rorion refused on the grounds that he was "not a kickboxer". None of Gracie's claims were independently verified.

== Movie roles ==
Urquidez has played a number of roles in various martial arts movies. The first was Force: Five (1981), starring Joe Lewis and Bong Soo Han. Later, he made two movies with Jackie Chan, Wheels on Meals (1984) and Dragons Forever (1988), wherein he fights against the characters played by Jackie Chan, Sammo Hung and Yuen Biao. Urquidez is depicted as a relentlessly tough opponent who is defeated in the climactic fight scenes of both movies. His final fight with Chan in Wheels on Meals is considered to be among the finest fights of Chan's career, including by Chan himself.

Urquidez cameoed as a kickboxer in the Troma film Ragin' Cajun. The movie, filmed in 1988 and released in 1991, wrongfully asserted that it featured Urquidez's first film appearance, stating in the opening credits, "Introducing Benny 'The Jet' Urquidez". He appeared in the 1989 film Roadhouse as one of the fighters seen at a car dealership which is partially destroyed in elaborately choreographed mayhem. He trained Patrick Swayze in his own fighting techniques for the film. Urquidez appears in the 1991 film Blood Match, and in 1992, he played a referee in the James Woods and Louis Gossett Jr. film Diggstown. He has a cameo appearance in the movie Street Fighter (1994), playing one of several prisoners put in a truck with Ken, Ryu, Sagat and Vega. Urquidez was also responsible for the physical training of most of the Street Fighter cast. He was set to play a different character in the franchise, Raven, in a game based on the movie, but the character was later scrapped.

Urquidez performed in the film Grosse Pointe Blank (1997) as Felix La Poubelle, a hitman sent to kill a character played by John Cusack. He appeared in 1408 (2007) as a spectral killer with a hammer, again with Cusack. Urquidez is Cusack's long-time kickboxing trainer. Urquidez also appeared as one of several thugs who accost Kirsten Dunst's character in the first Spider-Man film during an attempted robbery; Urquidez plays the thug wearing a black-and-white-striped T-shirt who makes kissing noises at Dunst.

He was a fight coordinator for an episode of the television drama Criminal Minds, "The Bittersweet Science" (season 7, episode 10), and also appears in the episode in a 30-second role as an underground MMA referee.

== Titles and awards ==
- World Kickboxing League W.K.L – Hall of Fame 2013
- Black Belt Magazine
  - 1978 Competitor of the Year
- KATOGI
  - KATOGI super-lightweight (−63.6 kg) world champion (0 title defences – vacated): 1978
- Muay Thai Bond Nederland
  - M.T.B.N. welterweight (−66 kg) world champion (0 title defences – vacated): 1984
- National Karate League
  - N.K.L. lightweight (−70.5 kg) world champion (3 title defences – vacated): 1974–1975
- Professional Karate Association
  - P.K.A. lightweight (−65.9 kg) world champion (2 title defences – vacated): 1976–1977
- STAR System World Kickboxing Ratings
  - S.T.A.R. undisputed welterweight (−66.8 kg) world champion: 1985
  - S.T.A.R. undisputed super-welterweight (−70.5 kg) world champion: 1974
- World Kickboxing Association
  - W.K.A. super-welterweight (−70 kg) world champion (0 title defences – vacated): 1993
  - W.K.A. welterweight (−66.8 kg) world champion (0 title defences – vacated): 1985
  - W.K.A. super-lightweight (−64.5 kg) world champion (14 title defences – vacated): 1977–1985 Note that 1 of the defences were for the W.K.A. lightweight world title (−65.9 kg) but the weight classes were later restructured
- World Professional Karate Organization
  - W.P.K.O. lightweight (−65.9 kg) world champion (0 title defences): 1975
- World Series of Martial Arts Championships
  - W.S.M.A.C. lightweight (−79.5 kg) world champion (4 title defences – vacated): 1975–1976
  - W.S.M.A.C. openweight (unlimited weight) world champion (1 title defences – vacated): 1974–1976

== Kickboxing record ==
Note that the record below is the documented professional record of Benny Urquidez from the S.T.A.R. website. He also is believed to have 11 undocumented matches, winning 10, drawing one with all 10 victories by way of KO.

Kickboxing record
48 wins (35 (T)KOs, 14 decisions), 1 loss, 1 draw, 3 no contests
Date	Result	Opponent	Event/Venue	Location	Method	Round	Time	Record
1993-12-04	Win	(Japan) Yoshihisa Tagami	W.K.A. Event @ Mirage Hotel	Las Vegas, Nevada, USA	Decision (split)	12		48–1–4
Wins W.K.A. super welterweight (−70 kg) world title. Vacates title after bout.
1985-11-16	Win	(Canada) Tom Larouche	W.K.A. Event	Northridge, California, USA	Decision (split)	12	2:00	47–1–3
Wins W.K.A. welterweight (−66.8 kg) world title and receives recognition as S.T.A.R. undisputed welterweight (−66.8 kg) champion. Prior to fight vacates W.K.A. super-lightweight world title, while after fight he also vacates W.K.A. welterweight world title.
1984-01-15	Win	(Netherlands) Iwan Sprang	M.T.B.N. Event	Amsterdam, Netherlands	TKO (referee stoppage)	4	1:37	46–1–3
Wins M.T.B.N. welterweight (−66 kg) world title.
1983-09-12	Win	(Japan) "Iron" Fujimoto	W.K.A. Event	Tokyo, Japan	KO	6	1:37	45–1–3
Retains W.K.A. super-lightweight (−64.5 kg) world title (14th defence).
1983-01-08	Win	(Japan) Kunimasa Nagae	W.K.A. Event	Tokyo, Japan	KO	4		44–1–3
Retains W.K.A. super-lightweight (−64.5 kg) world title (13th defence).
1982-06-21	Win	(Japan) Yutaka Koshikawa	W.K.A. Event	Vancouver, British Columbia, Canada	KO (spinning back kick)	6	1:48	43–1–3
Retains W.K.A. super-lightweight (−64.5 kg) world title (12th defence).
1982-02-02	Win	(United States) Jesse Orrozzo	W.K.A. Event @ Queen Elizabeth Stadium	Hong Kong	Decision	6	2:00	42–1–3
1981-04-09	Win	(Hong Kong) Kong Fu Tak	W.K.A. Event @ Queen Elizabeth Stadium	Hong Kong	TKO (cut)	4		41–1–3
Retains W.K.A. super-lightweight (−64.5 kg) world title (11th defence).
1980-08-09	NC	(United States) Billye Jackson	W.K.A. Event	West Palm Beach, Florida, USA	Decision loss	7	2:00	40–1–3
1980-04-19	Win	(United States) Frank Holloway	W.K.A. Event	Vancouver, British Columbia, Canada	Decision	9	2:00	40–1–2
Retains W.K.A. super-lightweight (−64.5 kg) world title (10th defence).
1980-01-26	Win	(Japan) Shinobu Onuki	W.K.A. Event @ Tropicana Casino Hotel	Las Vegas, Nevada, USA	KO (left hook)	7		39–1–2
Retains W.K.A. super-lightweight (−64.5 kg) world title (9th defence).
1979–?-?	Win	(Mexico)	W.K.A. Event	Tijuana, Mexico	KO	4		38–1–1
1979-10-01	Win	(Japan) Yoshimitsu Tamashiro	W.K.A. & A.J.K.B.A. Event	Tokyo, Japan	Decision	9	2:00	37–1–2
Retains W.K.A. super-lightweight (−64.5 kg) world title (8th defence).
1979-09-14	Win	(United States) Frank Holloway	W.K.A. Event	Ensenada, Mexico	Decision	9	2:00	36–1–2
Retains W.K.A. super-lightweight (−64.5 kg) world title (7th defence).
1979–?-?	Win	(Thailand)	W.K.A. Event	Tijuana, Mexico	KO	2		35–1–2
1979-07-05	Win	Frank Lee	W.K.A. Event @ Northland Pavilion	Edmonton, Alberta, Canada	KO			34–1–2
1979-05-02	Win	(United States) Rick Simmerly	W.K.A. Event	South Lake Tahoe, California, USA	KO	6		33–1–2
Retains W.K.A. super-lightweight (−64.5 kg) world title (6th defence).
1978-08-02	Loss	(Thailand) Prayut Sitiboonlert	KATOGI Event	Tokyo, Japan	Decision	6	3:00	32–1–2
Loses KATOGI super-lightweight (−63.6 kg) world title.
1978-04-29	Win	(Japan) Shinobu Onuki	W.K.A. & A.J.K.B.A. Event	Tokyo, Japan	TKO (injury)	3	1:17	32–0–2
Retains W.K.A. super-lightweight (−64.5 kg) world title (5th defence). Fight was originally awarded to Onuki via a disqualification victory due to what was deemed an illegal throw by Urquidez. This was later changed to a no contest and then by the W.K.A. to a TKO victory for Urquidez.
1978-04-10	Win	(Japan) Takeshi Naito	KATOGI Event	Osaka, Japan	KO (spinning back kick)	1	1:16	31–0–2
Wins KATOGI super-lightweight (−63.6 kg) world title.
1978-04-05	Win	(Canada) Dave Paul	W.K.A. Event	Vancouver, British Columbia, Canada	TKO	4		30–0–2
Retains W.K.A. super-lightweight (−64.5 kg) world title (4th defence).
1977-11-14	Win	(Japan) Kunimatsu Okao	W.K.A. & A.J.K.B.A. Event @ Nippon Budokan	Tokyo, Japan	KO	4	1:31	29–0–2
Retains W.K.A. super-lightweight (−64.5 kg) world title (3rd defence).
1977-08-03	Win	(Japan) Katsuyuki Suzuki	W.K.A. & A.J.K.B.A. Event @ Nippon Budokan	Tokyo, Japan	KO	6		28–0–2
Retains W.K.A. super-lightweight (−64.5 kg) world title (2nd defence). Note that W.K.A. had reclassified their weight divisions with the super-lightweight replacing lightweight and weights being slightly lower.
1977-07-?	Win	(Mexico)	W.K.A. Event	Tijuana, Mexico	KO (kick)	1		27–0–2
Retains W.K.A. lightweight (−65.9 kg) world title (1st defence).
1977-04-23	Win	(United States) Howard Jackson	P.K.A. Event @ Hilton Hotel	Las Vegas, Nevada, USA	TKO (referee stoppage)	4	1:25	26–0–2
Retains P.K.A. lightweight (−65.9 kg) world title (2nd defence).
1977-03-12	NC	(Thailand) Narongnoi Kiatbandit	W.K.A. Event	Los Angeles, California, USA	No contest (riot in crowd)	9		25–0–2
Fight was for Urquidez's W.K.A. lightweight (−65.9 kg) world title. Match resulted in a no contest after bout was stopped due to a riot in the crowd after Narongnoi was penalised for multiple fouls.
1976-10-01	Win	(United States) Eddie Andujar	P.K.A. & W.K.A. Event	Los Angeles, California, USA	TKO	8		25–0–1
Wins inaugural W.K.A. lightweight (−65.9 kg) world title. Also retains P.K.A. lightweight (−65.9 kg) world title (1st defence).
1976-08-28	Win	(United States) Earnest Hart Jr.	P.K.A. Event @ Neal Blaisdell Center	Honolulu, Hawaii, USA	Decision	9	2:00	24–0–1
Wins inaugural P.K.A. lightweight (−65.9 kg) world title .
1976–?-?	Win	(Thailand)		Tijuana, Mexico	KO (kick)	3		23–0–1
1976-06-?	Win	(Thailand) Sanun Plypoolsup	W.S.M.A.C. Event	Dallas, Texas, USA	Decision	8	3:00	22–0–1
Retains W.S.M.A.C. openweight world title (1st defence).
1976-02-14	Draw	(United States) Earnest Hart Jr.		Los Angeles, California, USA	Technical draw (Hart cut after throw)	1		21–0–1
1976–?-?	Win		N.K.L. Event	Detroit, Michigan, USA	KO	1		21–0–0
1975-12-?	Win		N.K.L. Event	Detroit, Michigan, USA	KO	2		20–0–0
Urquidez had initially been disqualified for knocking out his opponent with a 4th punch when the N.K.L. rules had stated that for every 3 punches a kick must follow. However, S.T.A.R. later overturned the decision due to a number of factors including the fact that the referee was Urquidez's opponent's martial arts instructor.
1975-10-11	Win	(United States) Bill Henderson	W.S.M.A.C. Event	Los Angeles, California, USA	KO	3	0:32	19–0–0
Retains W.S.M.A.C. lightweight (−79.5 kg) world title (4th defence).
1975-09-21	Win	(United States) Farrel Sojot	W.S.M.A.C. Event @ Honolulu International Center Arena	Honolulu, Hawaii, USA	TKO	3		18–0–0
1975-08-?	Win	(United States) Marcelino Torres	N.K.L. Event	San Juan	KO	1	0:30	17–0–0
1975-07-26	Win	(United States) Burnis White	W.S.M.A.C. Event	Honolulu, Hawaii, USA	KO (kick)	4		16–0–0
Retains W.S.M.A.C. lightweight (−79.5 kg) world title (3rd defence).
1975-07-?	Win	(United States) Sammy Pace	N.K.L. Event	Los Angeles, California, USA	KO	1		15–0–0
1975-06-28	Win	(United States) Eddie Andujar	N.K.L. Event	Los Angeles, California, USA	Decision	3	3:00	14–0–0
Retains N.K.L. lightweight (70.5 kg) world title (3rd defence).
1975-06-20	Win	(United States) Ken Riley	W.S.M.A.C. Event	Honolulu, Hawaii, USA	KO	2		13–0–0
Retains W.S.M.A.C. lightweight (−79.5 kg) world title (2nd defence).
1975-05-30	Win	(Thailand) Sanun Plysoolsup	W.S.M.A.C. Event	Honolulu, Hawaii, USA	TKO (cut)	2		12–0–0
Retains W.S.M.A.C. lightweight (−79.5 kg) world title (1st defence).
1975-05-16	Win	(United States) Roland Talton	W.S.M.A.C. Event	Los Angeles, California, USA	KO (knee)	2	2:04	11–0–0
Wins W.S.M.A.C. lightweight (−79.5 kg) world title.
1975-05-10	Win	(United States) Tayari Casel	W.P.K.O. Event @ Madison Square Garden	New York City, New York, USA	Decision	3	3:00	10–0–0
Wins W.P.K.O. lightweight (−65.9 kg) world title.
1975-04-?	Win	(United States) Demetrius Havanas	N.K.L. Event @ Tarrant County Convention Center	Savannah, Georgia, USA	Decision	3	3:00	9–0–0
Retains N.K.L. lightweight (−70.5 kg) world title (2nd defence).
1975-03-?	Win		N.K.L. Event	Atlanta, Georgia, USA	KO (kick)	2		8–0–0
Retains N.K.L. lightweight (−70.5 kg) world title (1st defence).
1975-03-?	Win	(United States) Ken Kolodziej		Milwaukee, Wisconsin, USA	KO (knee)	4		7–0–0
1975-02-?	Win	(United States) Arthur Butch Bell	N.K.L. Event	Savannah, Georgia, USA	TKO	2		6–0–0
Wins inaugural N.K.L. lightweight (−70.5 kg) world title. Also receives recognition as S.T.A.R. undisputed super-welterweight (−70.5 kg) world champion .
1974-11-15	Win	(Australia) Dana Goodson	W.S.M.A.C. Event, Final	Honolulu, Hawaii, USA	Decision	3	3:00	5–0–0
Wins inaugural W.S.M.A.C. openweight world title.
1974-11-15	Win	(United States) Burnis White	W.S.M.A.C. Event, Semi Final	Honolulu, Hawaii, USA	Decision	3	3:00	4–0–0
1974-11-14	Win	(United States) Bill Rosehill	W.S.M.A.C. Event, Quarter Final	Honolulu, Hawaii, USA	TKO (forfeit)	3		3–0–0
1974-11-14	Win	(American Samoa) Futi Semanu	W.S.M.A.C. Event, 2nd Round	Honolulu, Hawaii, USA	KO	2		2–0–0
1974-11-14	Win	(United States) Tom Mossman	W.S.M.A.C. Event, 1st Round	Honolulu, Hawaii, USA	KO (foot sweep)	3		1–0–0
Legend: Win Loss Draw/no contest Notes

Exhibition kickboxing record
Date	Result	Opponent	Event/venue	Location	Method	Round	Time
1989-04-24	No-Decision	(Japan) Nobuya Asuka (Ikuya Sumino)	N.J.P.W. Event @ Tokyo Dome	Tokyo, Japan	No decision	5	2:00
Legend: Win Loss Draw/no contest Notes

== See also ==
- List of male kickboxers
