= James Hong filmography =

American actor

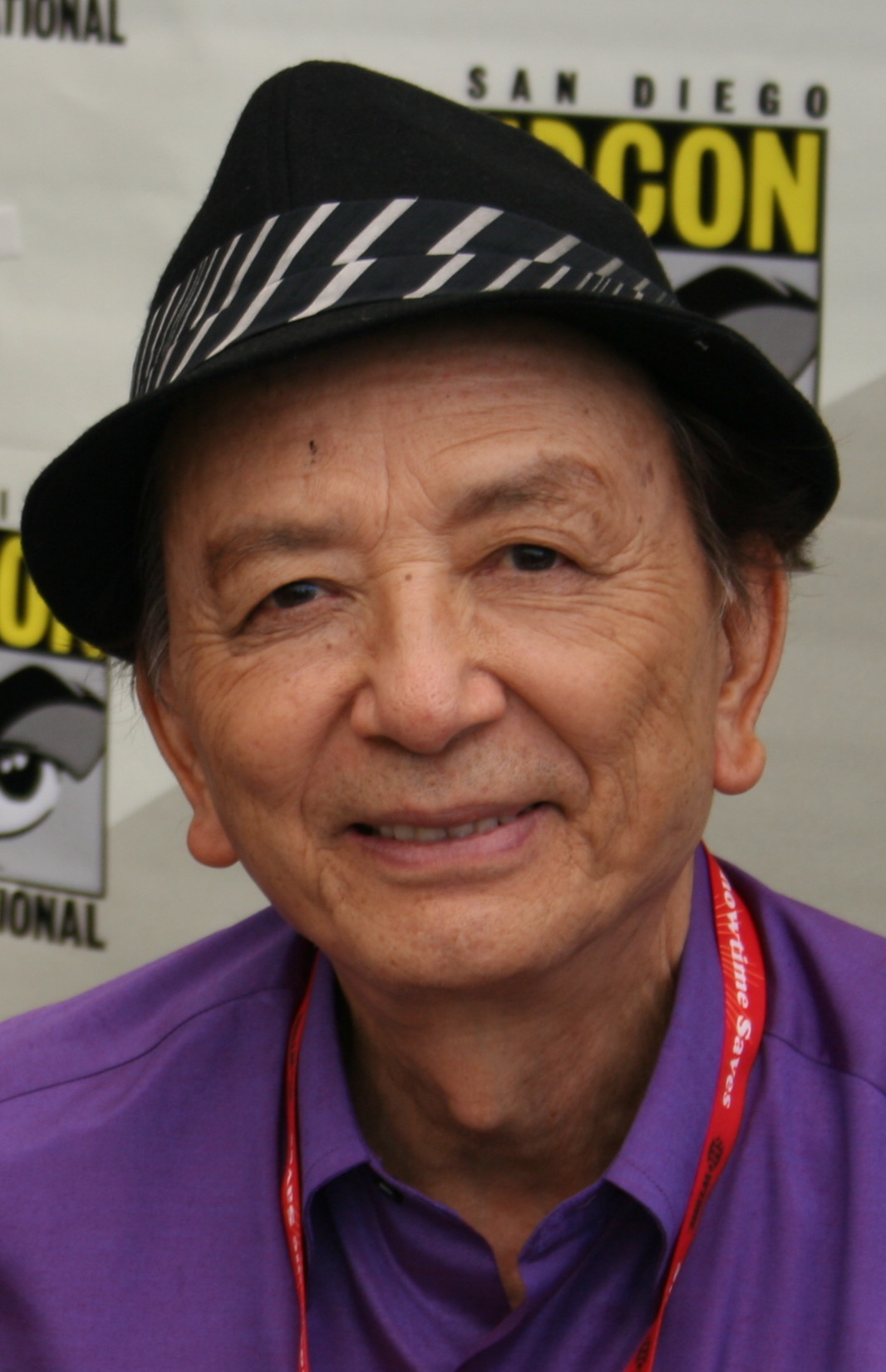
Hong at San Diego Comic-Con (2011)

James Hong (born 1929) is an American actor, producer and director who has appeared in more than 600 films, TV shows and video games. He is one of the most prolific character actors of all time. His career began in the 1950s when he redubbed soundtracks of several Asian films. Notable roles include Hannibal Chew in Blade Runner (1982), David Lo Pan in Big Trouble in Little China (1986), Jeff Wong in Wayne's World 2 (1993), and Chi-Fu in Mulan (1998). Hong is also known for voicing Daolon Wong on the television series Jackie Chan Adventures and Mr. Ping in the Kung Fu Panda franchise.

== Film ==
James Hong's film credits
| Year | Title | Role | Notes |
|---|---|---|---|
| 1954 | Dragonfly Squadron | South Korean Pilot Trainee | Uncredited |
| 1955 | Soldier of Fortune | Chinese Policeman | Uncredited |
| 1955 | Love Is a Many-Splendored Thing | Fifth Brother | Uncredited |
| 1955 | Blood Alley | Communist Soldier | Uncredited |
| 1956 | Godzilla, King of the Monsters! | Ogata, Serizawa | Voice; uncredited |
| 1956 | Flight to Hong Kong | Traffic Policeman | Uncredited |
| 1957 | Battle Hymn | Major Chong | Uncredited |
| 1957 | The Seventh Sin | Chinese Officer | Uncredited |
| 1957 | China Gate | Charlie | |
| 1959 | Blood and Steel | Japanese Draftsman | |
| 1959 | Never So Few | General Chao | Uncredited |
| 1960 | The Human Vapor | The Narrator, Mizuno | Voice; English dub |
| 1961 | Flower Drum Song | Head Waiter | |
| 1965 | The Satan Bug | Dr. Yang | |
| 1966 | One Spy Too Many | Prince Phanong | |
| 1966 | Destination Inner Space | Ho Lee | |
| 1966 | The Sand Pebbles | Victor Shu | |
| 1968 | The Bamboo Saucer | Archibald | Independent film |
| 1970 | Colossus: The Forbin Project | Dr. Chin | |
| 1970 | The Hawaiians | Ti Chong | |
| 1971 | Fearless Fighters | One Man Army | Voice; English dub |
| 1972 | The Carey Treatment | David Tao | |
| 1972 | Hot Connections | The Snooper | Uncredited; also director |
| 1974 | Dynamite Brothers | Wei Chin | Blaxploitation film |
| 1974 | Chinatown | Kahn, Evelyn's Butler | |
| 1974 | China Girl | Y.C. Chan | |
| 1976 | No Deposit, No Return | Ming Lo | |
| 1976 | Bound for Glory | Chili Joint Owner | |
| 1977 | The World's Greatest Lover | Yes Man #3 | |
| 1978 | Go Tell the Spartans | The Old Man | |
| 1978 | Libra | Dr. Chin | Short film |
| 1979 | The In-Laws | Bing Wong | |
| 1979 | Teen Lust | N/A | Also director |
| 1980 | Airplane! | Japanese General | |
| 1981 | True Confessions | Wong, The Coroner | |
| 1981 | So Fine | Asian Man #1 | |
| 1982 | Blade Runner | Hannibal Chew | |
| 1982 | Yes, Giorgio | Kwan | |
| 1983 | Breathless | Grocer | |
| 1984 | Ninja III: The Domination | Miyashima | |
| 1984 | Missing in Action | General Tran | |
| 1986 | The Golden Child | Dr. Hong | |
| 1986 | Big Trouble in Little China | David Lo Pan | |
| 1987 | Revenge of the Nerds II: Nerds in Paradise | "Snotty" | |
| 1987 | China Girl | Gung Tu | Independent film |
| 1987 | Black Widow | Shin | |
| 1988 | Vice Versa | Kwo | |
| 1988 | Hot to Trot | Boss | |
| 1989 | Tango & Cash | Mr. Quan | |
| 1989 | The Jitters | Tony Yang Sr. | |
| 1989 | The Vineyard | Dr. Elson Po | Also writer and director |
| 1989 | Tax Season | Mr. Tagasaki | |
| 1989 | Caged Fury | Detective Randall Stoner | |
| 1990 | The Two Jakes | Kahn | |
| 1990 | Shadowzone | Dr. Van Fleet | |
| 1990 | Too Much Sun | Frank Sr. | |
| 1990 | Dragonfight | Asawa | |
| 1990 | Bethune: The Making of a Hero | Leung | |
| 1991 | The Perfect Weapon | Yung | |
| 1991 | Missing Pieces | Chang | |
| 1991 | Mystery Date | Fortune Teller | |
| 1991 | Goodbye Paradise | Cook | |
| 1991 | Crime Lords | Ling | |
| 1992 | Talons of the Eagle | Mr. Li | |
| 1992 | Body Trouble | "Boomer" | |
| 1993 | Wayne's World 2 | Jeff Wong | Voice by Jim Downey |
| 1993 | L.A. Goddess | Edward | |
| 1993 | Merlin | Leong Tao | |
| 1994 | The Shadow | Li Peng | |
| 1994 | Femme Fontaine: Killer Babe for the C.I.A. | Master Sun | |
| 1994 | Operation Golden Phoenix | Mr. Chang | |
| 1995 | Bad Company | Bobby Birdsong | |
| 1995 | Tank Girl | Che'tsai | |
| 1995 | Operation Dumbo Drop | Y B'ham | |
| 1995 | Guns and Lipstick | Mr. Song | |
| 1995 | Cyber Bandits | Tojo Yokohama | |
| 1995 | Gladiator Cop | Parmenion | |
| 1996 | Infinity | Abacus Operator | |
| 1996 | Bloodsport II: The Next Kumite | Sun | |
| 1996 | The Secret Agent Club | Mr. Yamata | |
| 1996 | South Beach Academy | Johnny Staccato | |
| 1996 | Paper Dragons | Master Tsai | |
| 1997 | Bloodsport III | Master Sun | |
| 1997 | McHale's Navy | Asian Leader | Uncredited |
| 1997 | Red Corner | Lin Shou | |
| 1997 | Catherine's Grove | Dr. Lee | |
| 1998 | Mulan | Chi Fu | Voice |
| 1998 | Broken Vessels | Mr. Chen | |
| 1998 | Breakout | Mr. Wang | |
| 1999 | G2: Mortal Conquest | Parmenion | |
| 1999 | Singapore Sling | Adam Chance | Also director |
| 2000 | The Art of War | Ambassador Wu | |
| 2001 | The Ghost | Jing's Adoptive Father | |
| 2002 | Hero | Qin Emperor | Voice; English dub |
| 2002 | The Biggest Fan | Larson | Direct-to-video |
| 2002 | The Idol | Zao | |
| 2003 | Pray Another Day | General Hu Phlung Pu | Short film |
| 2003 | Ghost Rock | Weng | |
| 2004 | Latin Dragon | Mr. Rhee | |
| 2005 | Forbidden Warrior | Muraji, The Warlord | |
| 2005 | American Fusion | Dr. Wong | |
| 2006 | Exit 38 | Dr. Shen | |
| 2006 | Choose Your Own Adventure: The Abominable Snowman | Monk | |
| 2006 | One Night with You | Freddy | |
| 2006 | Totally Awesome | Mr. Yamagashi | |
| 2007 | Adventures of Johnny Tao | Sifu | Voice; Direct-to-video |
| 2007 | Shanghai Kiss | Mark Liu | Direct-to-video |
| 2007 | Balls of Fury | Master Wong | |
| 2007 | Chill Out, Scooby-Doo! | The High Lama | Voice; Direct-to-video |
| 2007 | An Accidental Christmas | Rico | |
| 2008 | The Day the Earth Stood Still | Mr. Wu | |
| 2008 | Kung Fu Panda | Mr. Ping | Voice; Nominated – Annie Award for Voice Acting in a Feature Production |
| 2010 | Genghis Khan: The Story of a Lifetime | N/A | |
| 2010 | How to Make Love to a Woman | Sifu | |
| 2011 | Tattoo | The Old Man | Short film |
| 2011 | Kung Fu Panda 2 | Mr. Ping | Voice; Nominated – Annie Award for Voice Acting in a Feature Production |
| 2012 | Safe | Han Jiao | |
| 2012 | Junk | Yukio Tai | |
| 2013 | R.I.P.D. | Grandpa Jerry Chen | |
| 2013 | The Lost Medallion: The Adventures of Billy Stone | Faleaka | Independent film |
| 2013 | Blunt Movie | Travel Hang, Grandpa | |
| 2015 | Tom and Jerry: Spy Quest | Dr. Zin | Voice; Direct-to-video |
| 2015 | Monkey King: Hero Is Back | Old Monk | Voice; English dub |
| 2015 | Genghis Khan Conquers the Moon | Wizard | Short film |
| 2016 | Kung Fu Panda: Secrets of the Scroll | Mr. Ping | Voice; short film |
| 2016 | Kung Fu Panda 3 | Mr. Ping | Voice |
| 2016 | Fortune Cookie | Gui Po | |
| 2016 | Better Criminal | Harold Fat | |
| 2017 | Unfallen | Consulate | |
| 2018 | Sherlock Gnomes | Salt Shaker | Voice cameo |
| 2018 | The Next Kill | Shop Keep | |
| 2019 | Grand-Daddy Day Care | Walter | Direct-to-video |
| 2019 | Abominable | Yak Herder | Voice cameo |
| 2019 | The Haunted Swordsman | The Navigator | Short film |
| 2019 | Cross 3 | Mr. Moo | |
| 2019 | Dropa | Jin | |
| 2020 | Beast Mode | Pish Rudabaker | |
| 2021 | Batman: Soul of the Dragon | O-Sensei | Voice; Direct-to-video |
| 2021 | Trollhunters: Rise of the Titans | Zong Shi | Voice; streaming film |
| 2022 | Turning Red | Mr. Gao | Voice; streaming film |
| 2022 | Everything Everywhere All at Once | Gong Gong | Screen Actors Guild Award for Outstanding Performance by a Cast in a Motion Picture |
| 2022 | Wendell & Wild | Father Bests | Voice; streaming film |
| 2024 | The Thundermans Return | Gideon's Grandfather, Grandpa Giddy | Streaming film |
| 2024 | Kung Fu Panda 4 | Mr. Ping | Voice |
| 2026 | You Can't Win | Old Chinese Man | Filmed in 2012. |

== Television ==
James Hong's television credits
| Year | Title | Role | Notes |
|---|---|---|---|
| 1955 | TV Reader's Digest | Judge #4 | Episode: "The Brainwashing of John Hayes" |
| 1955 | Fireside Theatre | Mark Chu | Episode: "Bamboo Cross" |
| 1955 | Cavalcade of America | N/A | Episode: "Barbed Wire Christmas" |
| 1956 | Crossroads | Young Sentry | Episode: "Calvary in China" |
| 1956 | Sky King | Jimmy Ling | Episode: "Red Tentacles" |
| 1956 | The Man Called X | N/A | 2 episodes |
| 1956 | Crusader | Lin Quon | Episode: "A Little Friend" |
| 1956 | NBC Matinee Theater | N/A | Episode: "The Lighted Window" |
| 1956 | Four Star Playhouse | Corporal Ikura | Episode: "Yellowbelly" |
| 1956 | The Millionaire | Lee | Episode: "The Jay Powers Story" |
| 1957–58 | The New Adventures of Charlie Chan | Barry Chan | 36 episodes |
| 1958 | Tombstone Territory | Lum Chen | Episode: "Tong War" |
| 1958 | General Electric Theater | Bellboy | Episode: "The Cold Touch" |
| 1958 | Playhouse 90 | Soldier | Episode: "Nightmare at Ground Zero" |
| 1958 | Buckskin | Chei-Lan | Episode: "China Boy" |
| 1958 | Flight | N/A | Episode: "Decision" |
| 1958 | Dragnet | N/A | Episode: "The Big Green Monkey" |
| 1959 | The Gale Storm Show | Fred Kim | Episode: "An Old Chinese Custom" |
| 1959 | The Californians | Charlie Wong | Episode: "Gold-Tooth Charlie" |
| 1959 | The Adventures of Rin-Tin-Tin | Danny | Episode: "The Ming Vase" |
| 1959 | Cimarron City | Tang | Episode: "Chinese Invasion" |
| 1959 | Peter Gunn | Johnny Chang | Episode: "Lady Windbell's Fan" |
| 1959 | Steve Canyon | Lui Ling | Episode: "Sabotage" |
| 1959 | Zorro | Chiu Chang | Episode: "Señor China Boy" |
| 1959 | Bat Masterson | Ching Sun | Episode: "To the Manner Born" |
| 1959 | The Loretta Young Show | Lee Chan | Episode: "Vengeance Is Thine" |
| 1959 | Death Valley Days | Joe 'China Joe' | Episode: "Lady of the Press" |
| 1959–60 | Richard Diamond, Private Detective | Chung Lin, Young Man | 2 episodes |
| 1959–60 | Bachelor Father | Jimmy, Cousin Frank | 2 episodes |
| 1960 | Sugarfoot | Hatchetman | Episode: "The Highbinder" |
| 1960 | Rescue 8 | Jimmy | Episode: "Ti-Ling" |
| 1960 | Johnny Ringo | Charlie Chung | Episode: "Single Debt" |
| 1960 | Alcoa Presents One Step Beyond | Tour Guide | Episode: "House of the Dead" |
| 1960 | Bonanza | Number One, Hop Sing's Cousin | 2 episodes |
| 1960 | Hong Kong | Lung Poy, Chen | 2 episodes |
| 1960–61 | The Barbara Stanwyck Show | Sam Wong, Jack Wong | 2 episodes |
| 1960–61 | Hawaiian Eye | Key, Wang Hai, Hop Toy, Captain Chang | 4 episodes |
| 1961 | The Islanders | Wu Pan | Episode: "The Strange Courtship of Danny Koo" |
| 1961 | Cheyenne | Suchin | Episode: "Legacy of the Lost" |
| 1961–62 | Adventures in Paradise | Kim Fong, Lim Fong | 2 episodes |
| 1962 | 87^{th} Precinct | Mike II | Episode: "Square Cop" |
| 1962 | Have Gun – Will Travel | Priest | Episode: "Coming of the Tiger" |
| 1962 | Checkmate | Louis Quong | Episode: "In a Foreign Quarter" |
| 1962 | Wagon Train | Ceong Wai Kok | Episode: "The John Augustus Story" |
| 1962 | The Lloyd Bridges Show | Priest, Quan | 2 episodes |
| 1962–63 | Ensign O'Toole | Headwaiter, Private Osano, Stagemanger | 3 episodes |
| 1962–63 | Perry Mason | Louis Kew, Dean Chang | 2 episodes |
| 1963 | The Outer Limits | Wen Li | Episode: "The Hundred Days of the Dragon" |
| 1964 | Kentucky Jones | Chin King | Episode: "Mail Order Bride" |
| 1964 | Slattery's People | Wing Fong | Episode: "Question: Is Laura the Name of the Game?" |
| 1964–65 | Mickey | Seymour Kwan | 2 episodes |
| 1965 | Ben Casey | Harry Lee | Episode: "No More, Cried the Rooster - There Will Be Truth" |
| 1965 | The Fugitive | Edward Hee | Episode: "End of the Line" |
| 1965–66 | The Man from U.N.C.L.E. | Prince Phanong, Mr. Chang | 3 episodes |
| 1965–66 | The Wackiest Ship in the Army | Migura, Aigin, Agaki | 4 episodes |
| 1965–67 | I Spy | Various Roles | 4 episodes |
| 1966 | I Dream of Jeannie | Chan | Episode: "Jeannie and the Kidnap Caper" |
| 1966 | The Donna Reed Show | Jim | Episode: "Is There a Small Hotel?" |
| 1966 | The F.B.I. | Tom Kagawa | Episode: "The Hiding Place" |
| 1966–67 | Iron Horse | Ching Lee, Chun Lee | 2 episodes |
| 1967 | Gomer Pyle, U.S.M.C. | Mr. Wong | Episode: "You Bet Your Won Ton" |
| 1967 | CBS Playhouse | Vietnamese Lieutenant | Episode: "The Final War of Olly Winter" |
| 1967-85 | This Is the Life | Yuan Tai | 2 episodes |
| 1968–69 | Family Affair | Phil Lee, Mr. Chung | 2 episodes |
| 1969–74 | Hawaii Five-O | James Watanu, Tot Kee, Eric Ling, Soong Chien | 4 episodes |
| 1970 | Here's Lucy | Lee Wong | Episode: "Lucy, the Laundress" |
| 1970 | The Bill Cosby Show | Doctor #2 | Episode: "Is There a Doctor in the Hospital?" |
| 1971 | The Young Lawyers | Court Clerk | Episode: "The Bradbury War" |
| 1971 | Mission: Impossible | Yin | Episode: "The Merchant" |
| 1971 | Vanished | Ned Lee | Television film |
| 1971 | The Forgotten Man | Major Thon | Television film |
| 1971 | A Tattered Web | Police Surgeon | Television film |
| 1971–75 | All in the Family | Chinese Waiter, Doctor | 2 episodes |
| 1972 | The Bob Newhart Show | The Man | Episode: "Bob and Emily and Howard and Carol and Jerry" |
| 1972–75 | Kung Fu | Hsiang, Old Man, Yin, Yam Tin, Men Han, Master Ywang Kyu, Mad Man, Han Tsung, Chun Yen | 9 episodes |
| 1973 | Ironside | Wilson | Episode: "All Honorable Men" |
| 1973 | Barnaby Jones | Sid Ching | Episode: "The Deadly Prize" |
| 1973 | The New Perry Mason | Nhi Khanh's Brother, Wong | 2 episodes |
| 1973 | Pueblo | 'Super C' | Television film |
| 1973 | Sunhshine | Dr. Wilde | Television film |
| 1974 | The Missiles of October | U Thant | Television film |
| 1974 | Judge Dee and the Monastery Murders | Prior | Television film |
| 1974 | The Missiles of October | U Thant | Television film |
| 1975 | McMillan & Wife | Bellhop | Episode: "Love, Honor and Swindle" |
| 1975 | Cannon | Wan Lee | Episode: "The Melted Man" |
| 1975–76 | Harry O | Lan Wuyen, Leonard Soon | 2 episodes |
| 1976 | The Blue Knight | Jimmy | Episode: "The Great Wall of Chinatown" |
| 1976 | The Rookies | Matsumoto | Episode: "Blue Movie, Blue Death" |
| 1976 | S.W.A.T. | Kwan Loon | Episode: "The Chinese Connection" |
| 1976 | Jigsaw John | Frank Chen | 15 episodes |
| 1976 | Baretta | Dr. Pao | Episode: "The Ninja" |
| 1976 | The Rockford Files | Kumagi, Forensic Expert | Episode: "The Oracle Wore a Cashmere Suit" |
| 1976 | The Streets of San Francisco | Robert Lee | 2 episodes |
| 1976 | Baa Baa Black Sheep | Colonel Ikuda | Episode: "Presumed Dead" |
| 1976 | Jade Snow | Jade Snow Wong's father | Television documentary |
| 1977 | Starsky & Hutch | Su Long | Episode: The Psychic" |
| 1977 | The Bionic Woman | Kurosawa | Episode: "Doomsday Is Tomorrow" |
| 1977 | Panic in Echo Park | Larry Lee | Television film |
| 1977 | Days of Our Lives | Dr. Haramaki | Episode: "2962" |
| 1977 | Wonder Woman | Oshima | Episode: "The Man Who Could Move the World" |
| 1977 | Bethune | General Nieh | Television film |
| 1977–78 | Switch | Wang | 4 episodes |
| 1978 | The Hardy Boys/Nancy Drew Mysteries | Dr. Kirin Kwo Low | Episode: "Sole Survivor" |
| 1978 | Maude | Morris Fong | Episode: "Maude's Big Move: Part 1" |
| 1978 | Charlie's Angels | Professor Perkins | Episode: "Angels in Vegas" |
| 1978 | Dr. Scorpion | Ho Chin | Television film |
| 1978 | Last of the Good Guys | Japanese Man | Television film |
| 1978 | My Husband Is Missing | Quan Dong | Television film |
| 1979 | Mandrake the Magician | Theron | Television film |
| 1979 | Salvage 1 | Lee Chow | Episode: "Shangri-la Lil" |
| 1979 | Taxi | Wealthy Passenger | Episode: "The Great Race" |
| 1979 | Hart to Hart | Holy Man | Episode: "The Man with the Jade Eyes" |
| 1979 | When Hell Was in Session | Nguyen | Television film |
| 1979 | Diff'rent Strokes | Mr. Lee | Episode: "The Dog Story" |
| 1980 | The Hustler of Muscle Beach | Desk Clerk | Television film |
| 1980 | The Return of Frank Cannon | Yutong | Television film |
| 1980 | Fantasy Island | The Butler | Episode: "Crescendo/Three Feathers" |
| 1981 | Soap | Peking Tom | Episode: "Season four, episode 12" |
| 1981 | Dallas | Ambassador | Episode: "Ewing-Gate" |
| 1982 | The Dukes of Hazzard | Billy Joe Fong | Episode: "Miz Tisdale on the Lam" |
| 1982 | The Letter | Old Man | Television film |
| 1982–83 | Marco Polo | Phags-Pa | 4 episodes |
| 1983 | Inspector Perez | Benson Liu | Television film |
| 1983 | China Rose | Professor Chen | Television film |
| 1983 | St. Elsewhere | Mr. Wong | Episode: "Graveyard" |
| 1983 | Bring 'Em Back Alive | Fu Kahn | Episode: "The Hostage" |
| 1983 | Dynasty | Dr. Chen Ling | 5 episodes |
| 1983 | General Hospital | Sung Cho Lee | 2 episodes |
| 1983 | Falcon Crest | Charles Fong | 3 episodes |
| 1983 | T.J. Hooker | Mr. Hong, Dr. Hong | 2 episodes |
| 1983 | Manimal | Grandfather Tan | Episode: "Breath of the Dragon" |
| 1984 | The Fall Guy | Chen Ying | Episode: "Always Say Always" |
| 1984–85 | The A-Team | Byron Fong, General Chow, Wan Chu | 2 episodes |
| 1985 | Blade in Hong Kong | Key Tam | Television film |
| 1985 | Tales from the Darkside | Chow Ting | Episode: "It All Comes Out in the Wash" |
| 1985 | American Playhouse | Chinese Immigrant | Episode: "Paper Angels" |
| 1985 | Cagney & Lacey | Mr. Nguyen | Episode: "Old Ghosts" |
| 1985 | Airwolf | General Rangavara | Episode: "Half-Pint" |
| 1985–87 | Santa Barbara | Dave Cheng, Harry Yamada | 3 episodes |
| 1985–88 | Hunter | Henry Chin, Chang | 2 episodes |
| 1986 | Crazy Like a Fox | Unknown | Episode: "The Road to Tobago" |
| 1986 | It's a Living | Minister of Protocol | Episode: "Jewel Heist" |
| 1986 | Who's the Boss? | Thomas Ping | Episode: "Mona's Limo" |
| 1986–91 | MacGyver | Chu, Kuang, Lee Wenying | 4 episodes |
| 1987 | Outlaws | Mr. Luc | Episode: "Primer" |
| 1987 | Magnum, P.I. | Han | Episode: "Forty" |
| 1987 | Stingray | Man With Goatee | Episode: "Anytime, Anywhere" |
| 1987 | Harry's Hong Kong | Mr. Yu | Television film |
| 1987 | Miami Vice | Riochi Tanaka | Episode: "The Rising Sun of Death" |
| 1987–89 | Tour of Duty | Jimmy, Colonel Li Trang, Quang | 3 episodes |
| 1988 | Beauty and the Beast | Chiang Lo Yi | Episode: "China Moon" |
| 1988 | The Equalizer | Sirit Bansari | Episode: "Riding the Elephant" |
| 1988 | Leap of Faith | Li | Television film |
| 1989 | The Karen Carpenter Story | Dr. Dentworth | Television film |
| 1989 | Brotherhood of the Rose | Colonel Chan | Miniseries |
| 1989 | War of the Worlds | Soo Tak | Episode: "The Last Supper" |
| 1989 | Gideon Oliver | Li Chou | Episode: "Tongs" |
| 1989 | Jake and the Fatman | Hiram | Episode: "The Lady in Red" |
| 1989 | The Rocket Boy | Mr. Wong | Television film |
| 1990 | China Beach | Bac Si | Episode: "Holly's Choice" |
| 1990 | Booker | Mr. Jaycom | Episode: "Love Life" |
| 1990 | Nasty Boys | Oscar | Episode: "Home Again" |
| 1990 | Last Flight Out | Inspector Quang | Television film |
| 1990 | Framed | Mr. Chew | Television film |
| 1990 | Partners in Life | M.C. | Television film |
| 1991 | Seinfeld | Bruce | Episode: "The Chinese Restaurant" |
| 1991 | Morton & Hayes | Hong Kong Theatre Manager | Episode: "Oafs Overboard" |
| 1991–92 | Doogie Howser, M.D. | Mr. Chen, Gardener | 3 episodes |
| 1992 | Forever Knight | Dr. Chung Tung Wa | Episode: "Cherry Blossoms" |
| 1992 | The Specialists | Narrator | Voice |
| 1992 | Raven | Black Dragon Warlord | Episode: "Prey" |
| 1993 | SWAT Kats: The Radical Squadron | Katzmer | Voice, episode: "Enter the Madkat" |
| 1993–94 | The Adventures of Brisco County, Jr. | Lee Pow | 3 episodes |
| 1994 | Come Die with Me: A Mickey Spillane's Mike Hammer Mystery | Nathan | Television film |
| 1994–96 | Kung Fu: The Legend Continues | Dalai Lama | 2 episodes |
| 1995 | Lois & Clark: The New Adventures of Superman | Grandfather Chow | Episode: "Chi of Steel" |
| 1995 | Triplecross | Old Chinese Man | Television film |
| 1995 | Legend | Chai | Episode: "Clueless in San Francisco" |
| 1995 | Chicago Hope | Dr. Tsu | Episode: "The Ethics of Hope" |
| 1995 | Diagnosis: Murder | Qwan Lok | Episode: "Murder in the Courthouse" |
| 1995–97 | Kung Fu: The Legend Continues | Emperor, Mr. Sung, Ba-Ba | Voice, 2 episodes |
| 1996 | The X-Files | Hard-Faced Man | Episode: "Hell Money" |
| 1996 | Sisters | Mr. Lon | Episode: "War and Peace: Part 1" |
| 1996 | Home Improvement | Dave | Episode: "Games, Flames & Automobiles" |
| 1996 | Malcolm & Eddie | Milton | Episode: "Dead Guy" |
| 1997 | Murphy Brown | Supervisor Monk | Episode: "Desperate Times" |
| 1997 | Ellen | The Waiter | Episode: "Hello Muddah, Hello Faddah" |
| 1997 | Friends | Hoshi | Episode: "The One with the Ultimate Fighting Champion" |
| 1997 | Hangin' with Mr. Cooper | Stan | Episode: "The Ring" |
| 1997–2001 | Dexter's Laboratory | Mr. Chau:, RA | Voice, 2 episodes |
| 1998 | The Practice | Mr. Wong | Episode: "In Deep" |
| 1998 | The Drew Carey Show | Government Worker | Episode: "The High Road to China" |
| 1999 | The Pretender | Mr. Lee | Episode: "Mr. Lee" |
| 1999 | Millennium | Monk | Episode: "Bardo Thodol" |
| 1999 | Todd McFarlane's Spawn | Zhang Lao, Gen Soon | Voice, episode: "Chasing the Serpent" |
| 1999–2000 | Martial Law | Weng Chu, Mayor Chang Yen | 3 episodes |
| 2000 | Zoe, Duncan, Jack and Jane | Mr. Chin | |
| 2000–02 | The West Wing | Chinese Ambassador | 2 episodes |
| 2001 | Gideon's Crossing | Daniel Chin | Episode: "Hinkytown" |
| 2001 | Epoch | Ambassador Po | Television film |
| 2001 | The Chronicle | David Lo Pan | Episode: "Here There Be Dragons" |
| 2001 | Charmed | Zen Master | Episode: "Enter the Demon" |
| 2001 | Alias | Joey | Episode: "Color Blind" |
| 2001–02 | The Division | Professor Carson Chan, Chinese Businessman | 2 episodes |
| 2002–04 | Jackie Chan Adventures | Daolon Wong | Voice, 18 episodes |
| 2003 | Lost at Home | Henry | Episode: "Good Will Hunting" |
| 2003 | 10-8: Officers on Duty | Min | Episode: "Let It Bleed" |
| 2004 | Malcolm in the Middle | Mr. Li | Episode: "Ida's Boyfriend" |
| 2004 | Teen Titans | Chang | Voice, episode: "X" |
| 2004 | Sucker Free City | Kwok | Television film |
| 2004 | Law & Order: Special Victims Unit | Sweatshop Owner | Episode: "Debt" |
| 2004 | Center of the Universe | Mr. Darawan | Episode: "Independence Day" |
| 2004–06 | Super Robot Monkey Team Hyperforce Go! | Mandarin, Armored Mandarin | Voice, 9 episodes |
| 2005–06 | Avatar: The Last Airbender | Dour Monk, Mayor Tong, additional voices | Voice, 2 episodes |
| 2006 | Twenty Good Years | Dr. Fong | Episode: "The Elbow Incident" |
| 2006 | The King of Queens | Mr. Soo | Episode: "Apartment Complex" |
| 2006 | The Loop | Chen Ming | Episode: "The Year of the Dog" |
| 2006 | Dragon Dynasty | Gao | Television film |
| 2006 | Totally Awesome | Mr. Yamagashi | Television film |
| 2006 | The Life and Times of Juniper Lee | Uncle Eddie | Voice, episode: "Party Monsters" |
| 2006 | Las Vegas | Monk Soli Tendar | Episode: "Delinda's Box: Part 2" |
| 2007 | In Case of Emergency | Mr. Lee | Episode: "Your Goose Is Cooked" |
| 2007 | Bones | Joseph Han | Episode: "The Boneless Bride in the River" |
| 2007 | Andy Barker, P.I. | Jon Leibowitz | Episode: "The Lady Varnishes" |
| 2007 | Chuck | Ben Lo Pan | Episode: "Chuck Versus the Sizzling Shrimp" |
| 2007 | An Accidental Christmas | Rico | Television film |
| 2007–08 | The Big Bang Theory | Chen | 2 episodes |
| 2008 | Zoey 101 | Mr. Takato | Episode: "Chasing Zoey" |
| 2009 | The Beast | Tre Lee Kuo | Episode: "The Walk In" |
| 2009 | Chowder | Lo Mein | Voice, episode: "Won Ton Bombs" |
| 2010 | Generator Rex | Vendor, Providence Soldier | Voice, episode: "Rabble" |
| 2010 | Gigantic | Restaurant Owner | Episode: "Zen and the Art of Getting Over It" |
| 2010 | Kung Fu Panda Holiday | Mr. Ping | Voice, television special |
| 2010–11 | I'm in the Band | Leon | 2 episodes |
| 2011 | Scooby-Doo! Mystery Incorporated | Chen, Red Wizard | Voice, 2 episodes |
| 2011 | Trinity Goodheart | Mr. Kwon | Television film |
| 2011 | Archer | Bucky | Voice, episode: "Heart of Archness" |
| 2011 | A.N.T. Farm | Kenny | Episode: "CANTonese Style Cuisine" |
| 2011–13 | Pair of Kings | Timothy Kalooka-Khan | 7 episodes |
| 2011–16 | Kung Fu Panda: Legends of Awesomeness | Mr. Ping | Voice, 38 episodes |
| 2012 | 2 Broke Girls | Mr. Chang | Episode: "And the Silent Partner" |
| 2012–16 | Regular Show | Keith, Mr. Zhang, Luggage Handler, Warlock, Manager | Voice, 3 episodes |
| 2013 | Incredible Crew | Ogisan | Episode: "Magical Video Game Controller" |
| 2013 | The First Family | Benny | Episode: "The First Senior Discount" |
| 2013 | Summoned | Frank | Television film |
| 2013 | Key & Peele | Mr. Shin | Episode: "Tackle & Grapple" |
| 2013 | China, IL | Wise Old Monk | Voice, episode: "Prank Week" |
| 2014 | Drunk History | Hyotaro Inouye | Episode: "Hawaii" |
| 2014 | Star Wars: The Clone Wars | Endente | Voice, 2 episodes |
| 2014–17 | Teenage Mutant Ninja Turtles | Ho Chan | Voice, 2 episodes |
| 2015 | Agents of S.H.I.E.L.D. | William May | Episode: "Purpose in the Machine" |
| 2015 | Randy Cunningham: 9^{th} Grade Ninja | Shopkeeper | Voice, episode: "Big Trouble in Little Norrisville" |
| 2015 | SuperMansion | Po | Voice, episode: "They Shoot Omega Pets, Don't They?" |
| 2015 | The Dog Who Saved Summer | Mr. Lee | Televisión film |
| 2015–16 | Mike Tyson Mysteries | Wang Jing, Professor Hong | Voice, 2 episodes |
| 2015–16 | Star Wars Rebels | Azmorigan | Voice, 3 episodes |
| 2016 | Bubble Guppies | Ming | Voice, Episode: "The New Year's Dragon!" |
| 2016 | Rush Hour | Honorable Dragon | 3 episodes |
| 2016 | Elementary | Meng Zhou | Episode: "Who Is That Masked Man?" |
| 2016 | The Blacklist | The Coroner | Episode: "Dr. Adrian Shaw" |
| 2017 | Nobodies | Ken Choi | 2 episodes |
| 2017 | Penn Zero: Part-Time Hero | Windmill Monster | Voice, episode: "At the End of the Worlds" |
| 2017 | Real Rob | Master Rishio | Episode: "Zen What Happens" |
| 2017–18 | The Thundermans | Gideon's Grandfather, Grandpa Giddy | 2 episodes |
| 2018 | The Last Sharknado: It's About Time | Confucius | Television film |
| 2018 | Hawaii Five-0 | Jin Leung | Episode: "Ka Hana A Ka Makua, O Ka Hana No Ia A Keiki" |
| 2018–19 | Kung Fu Panda: The Paws of Destiny | Mr. Ping | Voice, 25 episodes |
| 2020 | Teen Titans Go! | Turtle | Voice, episode: "The Night Begins To Shine: Chapter Three: Guitar" |
| 2020 | Space Command | Elder Michael | 2 episodes |
| 2021 | Star Wars: Visions | The Elder | Voice, episode: "The Elder", English dub |
| 2021 | Cake | Mr. Tran | Voice, episode: "Dinner Party" |
| 2022–23 | Kung Fu Panda: The Dragon Knight | Mr. Ping | Voice, 20 episodes |
| 2023 | The Muppets Mayhem | Chef Dan | Episode: "Track 3: Exile on Main Street" |
| 2023 | American Born Chinese | Jade Emperor | Episode: "Make a Splash" |
| 2023 | Praise Petey | Elder Belshazzar | Voice; recurring role; 4 episodes |
| 2023 | Family Guy | Elderly Parallel Parker | Voice; episode: "Old World Harm" |
| 2023–2025 | Gremlins: Secrets of the Mogwai | Grandpa, Wing Medicine Customer | Voice, main role; 13 episodes |

== Video games ==
James Hong's video game credits
| Year | Title | Voice role | Notes |
|---|---|---|---|
| 1997 | Blade Runner | Dr. Chew | |
| 1998 | Disney's Animated Storybook | Chi-Fu | |
| 2002 | Bruce Lee: Quest of the Dragon | Voiceover Talent | |
| 2003 | True Crime: Streets of LA | Ancient Wu, additional voice | |
| 2005 | Mercenaries: Playground of Destruction | Colonel Zhou Peng | |
| 2005 | Project Snowblind | Dr. Joseph Liaw | |
| 2005 | True Crime: New York City | Additional voices | |
| 2007 | Def Jam: Icon | Dr. Chang | Voice role and likeness |
| 2008 | Kung Fu Panda | Mr. Ping | |
| 2010 | Alpha Protocol | Hong Shi | |
| 2010 | Call of Duty: Black Ops | Additional voices | |
| 2011 | Kung Fu Panda 2 | Mr. Ping | |
| 2012 | Diablo III | Covetous Shen, the Jeweler | |
| 2012 | Sleeping Dogs | Uncle Po | |
| 2012 | World of Warcraft: Mists of Pandaria | Master Bruised Paw | |
| 2012 | Call of Duty: Black Ops II | Premier Chen | |
| 2013 | Marlow Briggs and the Mask of Death | Heng Long | |
| 2014 | Diablo III: Reaper of Souls | Covetous Shen, the Jeweler | |
| 2015 | Kung Fu Panda: Showdown of Legendary Legends | Mr. Ping | |
| 2017 | Prey | William Yu | |
| 2019 | Judgment | Kim | |
