= Gloria Manon =

American actress (1939–2018)

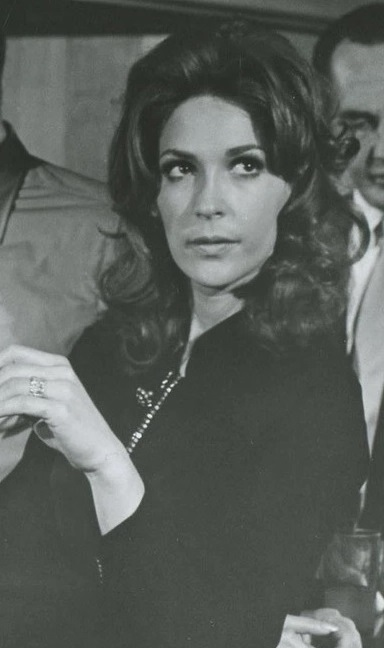
- Manon in All The Loving Couples (1969)
- Born: Gloria Patricia Manon; December 28, 1939; Detroit, Michigan, U.S.
- Died: November 12, 2018 (aged 78)
- Occupation: Actress
- Years active: 1965–2004

Gloria Patricia Manon (December 28, 1939 – November 12, 2018) was an American actress who was active mostly on television from 1965.

== Life and career ==
Manon appeared in such television series as Daniel Boone, Burke's Law, The Name of the Game, The Six Million Dollar Man, The Mod Squad, and Quincy M.E..

Her film credits included All the Loving Couples (1969), I Love My Wife (1970), Willy Wonka & the Chocolate Factory (1971, as Mrs Curtis) and The Woman Inside (1981). She returned to the screen in 2004 as The Contessa in the video game Sly 2: Band of Thieves.

Manon died on November 12, 2018, at the age of 78.

== Filmography ==
=== Film ===
Year	Title	Role	Notes
1969	All the Loving Couples	Liz Burnett	
1969	The Mad Room	Edna	
1970	I Love My Wife	Prostitute	
1971	Willy Wonka & the Chocolate Factory	Mrs. Curtis	uncredited
1981	The Woman Inside	Holly	
1987	Poker Alice	Saloon Girl	TV movie
2004	What the #$*! Do We (K)now!?	Herself	Voice role

=== Television ===
Year	Title	Role	Notes
1965	Daniel Boone	Kutawari	1 episode
1965	Burke's Law	Rosana	1 episode
1966	Daktari	Samira Hassan	1 episode
1970	The Psychiatrist	Kathy, a Therapy Group member	1 episode
1970-1973	Adam-12	Joan Renfro/Jackie Washington/Mrs. Bannister	3 episodes
1971	The Name of the Game	Dr. Arnold	1 episode
1971	The Mod Squad	May Petrie	1 episode
1973	Mannix	Georgia	1 episode
1973	Search	Mona Davos	1 episode
1974	Faith for Today	Aunt	1 episode
1976	The Streets of San Francisco	Lynn O'Brian	1 episode
1976-1977	Delvecchio	Lily McKenzie/Lilly	2 episodes
1976-1978	Switch	Anthea/Teddy Kay	2 episodes
1976-1980	Quincy M.E.	Carolyn Hughes/Jill Adams/Manager	3 episodes
1977	The Six Million Dollar Man	Madame Shera	1 episode
1977	Future Cop	Darlene Montoya	1 episode
1977	Barnaby Jones	Maxine	1 episode
1979	Bigfoot and Wildboy	Dr. Ericson	1 episode
1984	The Fall Guy	Barbary Coast Babs	1 episode

=== Video games ===
Year	Title	Role	Notes
2004	Sly 2: Band of Thieves	The Contessa	Voice role
