= Bill Ryusaki =

American martial artist (1936–2016)

- Born: October 14, 1936; Kamuela, Hawaii, US
- Died: December 4, 2016 (aged 80); Los Angeles, California, US
- Style: Kenpo

Mutsuto "Bill" Ryusaki was a pioneer of Kenpo in the United States.

== Early life ==
Bill Ryusaki was born October 14, 1936, in Kamuela, on the big island of Hawaii. Being the sixth child of twelve siblings (seven brothers and four sisters) his father, Torazo Ryusaki, named him Mutsuto meaning "Sixth Child." It wasn't until fourth grade when he received the name, Bill, from his teacher who was unable to pronounce his birth name.

Torazo Ryusaki held black belts in both Kodokan Judo and Shotokan Karate, and made it mandatory that all of his sons train in two styles of Martial Arts.

Bill Ryusaki trained in Shotokan Karate and Judo while his brothers trained in Kendo, Aikido, and Judo. Bill's older brothers would often use him as their practice dummy. At 19 years old, Ryusaki went to study at the University of Hawaii. He soon started training in Kenpo privately with Marino Tiwanak (a famous Hawaiian Boxer).

== Military career ==
Ryusaki was drafted into the U.S. Army and made his way to the Fort Ord military base in California. He was originally a military range finder, until a high-ranking officer got word of Ryusaki's martial art skills because of a fight that broke out on base. He then became advanced infantry where he taught hand-to-hand combat at Fort Benning, Georgia.

== Professional life ==
Ryusaki returned to California, where Marino Tiwanak told him to meet Ed Parker (American Kenpo). Ryusaki and Parker trained together and became pioneers of Kenpo Karate on the mainland of the United States. Parker asked Ryusaki to help with John Leoning and actor Poncie Ponce's dojo. In 1962 Ryusaki opened his own dojo combining his unique style of Judo, Jujitsu, Shotokan, Kenpo, and Aikido to become the founder of Ryu Dojo, Hawaiian Kenpo. He dedicated his school to his father, Torazo, to show his love and appreciation for all that is father had taught him. GM Ryusaki holds a tenth degree (Ju-Dan) in Hawaiian Kenpo and, a seventh-degree in Judo, as well as black belts in Shotokan and Aikido. Ryusaki has trained thousands of students including Dan Guzman, Erick Schumann and family, Otto Estuardo Schumman, Benny "The Jet", Arnold Urquidez Sr., and Cecil Peoples, and actor Bryan Becker.

Bill Ryusaki's legacy in the martial arts continues with Ryu-Dojo Hawaiian Kenpo schools around the world as well as with Fox of peace Dojo and the martial arts style Kitsune Kenpo Ju-Jitsu. Fox of Peace dojo and Kitsune Kenpo Ju-Jitsu was created at Bill Ryusaki's request, by one of his loyal students David Becker.

Ryusaki became successful in the entertainment industry as an actor and stuntman.

Ryusaki was inducted into the Martial Arts History Museum's Hall of Fame in 2003.

== Personal life ==
Ryusaki is the father of actress/stuntwoman Kimberly Ryusaki and stuntman Ryan Ryusaki. Ryusaki died on December 4, 2016.

== Partial filmography ==
- The Wrecking Crew (1968) - Henri (uncredited)
- Force: Five (1981)
- Some Kind of Hero (1982) - Basketball Player
- Blue Thunder (1983) - Vietcong Soldier
- Police Academy 2: Their First Assignment (1985) - Street Punk #2 (uncredited)
- Big Trouble in Little China (1986) - Wing Kong Hatchet Man
- Number One with a Bullet (1987) - Tai Chi teacher
- Cage (1989) - Chinese Guard #1
- RoboCop 2 (1990) - Cain's Gang Squad (uncredited)
- Come See the Paradise (1990) - Issei Gentleman
- Leather Jackets (1992) - Prath
- Ulterior Motives (1992) - Yakuza #1
- Point of No Return (1993) - Karate Instructor
- Deadly Target (1994) - Zhou
- Being John Malkovich (1999) - Mr. Hiroshi
- Price of Glory (2000) - Silver Gloves Official
- Revolve (2012) - David's Epitome and Obstacle 'F'
