= The Bees (film) =

1978 film

- Theatrical release poster
- Directed by: Alfredo Zacarías
- Written by: Alfredo Zacarías; Jack Hill
- Starring: John Saxon; John Carradine; Angel Tompkins; Claudio Brook; Alicia Encinas
- Music by: Richard Gillis
- Distributed by: New World Pictures
- Release date: November 17, 1978
- Running time: 95 minutes
- Country: Mexico
- Language: English

The Bees (Spanish: Abejas asesinas, "Killer Bees") is a 1978 Mexican horror film about South American bees imported to the USA, where they wreak havoc.

== Cast ==
- John Saxon - John Norman
- Angel Tompkins - Sandra Miller
- John Carradine - Dr. Sigmund Hummel
- Claudio Brook - Dr. Miller
- Alicia Encinas - Alicia
- Roger Cudney - Blankeley

== Production ==
The film was originally to be written and directed by Jack Hill but he was replaced by the producer during filming. Warner Bros. reputedly paid New World Pictures a large amount for the film's release to be delayed until after that of The Swarm (1978).

It was one of several Roger Corman-financed films starring John Saxon.
