= The Naked Cage =

- Theatrical release poster
- Directed by: Paul Nicholas
- Written by: Paul Nicholas
- Produced by: Samuel Benedict; Chris D. Nebe
- Starring: Shari Shattuck; Angel Tompkins; Lucinda Crosby; Stacey Shaffer; Christina Whitaker; Nick Benedict
- Cinematography: Hal Trussell
- Edited by: Warren Chadwick; Anthony DiMarco
- Music by: Christopher L. Stone
- Production company: The Cannon Group
- Distributed by: Cannon Film Distributors
- Release date: March 7, 1986
- Running time: 97 minutes
- Country: United States
- Language: English
- Box office: $3,136,701

The Naked Cage is a 1986 American drama thriller film written and directed by Paul Nicholas. The film stars Shari Shattuck, Angel Tompkins, Lucinda Crosby, Stacey Shaffer, Christina Whitaker and Nick Benedict. The film was released on March 7, 1986, by Cannon Film Distributors.

== Plot ==
Michelle, a young woman falsely convicted of a bank robbery, is sent to a prison run by Diane, a corrupt warden. She struggles to survive the harsh prison life, where violent bullying, sexual assault and drug addiction run rampant.

== Cast ==
- Shari Shattuck as Michelle
- Angel Tompkins as Diane
- Lucinda Crosby as Rhonda
- Stacey Shaffer as Amy
- Christina Whitaker as Rita
- Nick Benedict as Smiley
- John Terlesky as Willy
- Faith Minton as Sheila
- Aude Charles as Brenda
- Angela Elayne Gibbs as Vonna
- Carole Ita White as 'Trouble'
- Lisa London as Abbey
- Leslie Scarborough as 'Peaches'
- Valerie McIntosh as Ruby
- Larry Gelman as Doc
- Suzy London as Martha
- Flo Lawrence as Mother
- James Ingersoll as Father
- Seth Kaufman as Randy
- William Bassett as Jordan
- Nora Niesen as 'Bigfoot'
- Jennifer Anne Thomas as Mock
- Chris Anders as Miller
- Al Jones as The Bartender
- Sheila MacRae as Bank Teller
- Bob Saurman as Motorcycle Cop
- Rick Avery as Security Officer
- Christopher Doyle as Police Officer
- Gretchen Davis as Prison Guard
- Beryl Jones as Prison Guard
- Michael Kerr as Prison Guard

== Home Video ==
Scream Factory released the film on Blu-ray on May 2, 2017.
