= Angela E. Gibbs =

American actress

Angela Gibbs
- Born: Angela Elayne Gibbs; April 17, 1954 (age 72); Detroit, Michigan, U.S.
- Occupation: Actress
- Years active: 1973–present
- Mother: Marla Gibbs

Angela Elayne Gibbs (born April 17, 1954) is an American actress. She has acted professionally since the 1970s in films such as Cleopatra Jones, The Healers, and The Naked Cage. She later went on to act in films including Drumline, Think Like A Man, and Straight Outta Compton. Gibbs has also acted in television series including Black Jesus, On My Block, The Fosters, This is Us, Sealab 2021, Hacks, and Not Dead Yet. Born and raised in Detroit, Michigan, Gibbs is the daughter of actress Marla Gibbs. When she was a teenager her family relocated to Los Angeles, where she graduated from Fairfax High School.

== Filmography ==
Year	Title	Role	Notes
1973	Cleopatra Jones	Annie	
1973	The Young Nurses	Michelle	
1974	Sanford and Son	Angel	Episode "The Party Crasher"
1974	The Healers		TV Movie
1974	Together Brothers	Francine	
1975	The Blue Knight	Maria	Episode "Pilot"
1986	The Naked Cage	Vonna	
1987	Number One with a Bullet	Waitress in Bar	
1988	Party Line	Beth	
1994	In the Heat of the Night	Felicia Clark	Episode "A Matter of Justice"
1996	Savannah	Bank Official	Episode "Wedding Belle Blues"
1996	Fled	Jocelyn	
1998	Mama Flora's Family	Woman with Baby	
1999	Passing Glory	Thelma Porter	TV Movie
2001	Boycott	Congregant #1	
2001-2005	Sealab 2021	Debbie Love	Voice; 8 episodes
2002	Drumline	Dorothy Miles	
2004	Crossing Jordan	Margaret Houston	Episode "Second Chances"
2004	The Bold and the Beautiful	Make-Up Artist	1 episode
2006	Frisky Dingo	Voice	Episode "Emergency Room"
2007	Monk	Barton's Lawyer	Episode "Mr. Monk and the Wrong Man"
2007, 2009	Lincoln Heights	Woman/Patient	2 episodes
2009	Nip/Tuck	Mrs. Jennings	Episode "Budi Sabri"
2010	Bones	Jocelyn Arrington	Episode "The Parts in the Sum of the Whole"
2010	Grey's Anatomy	Mrs. Rollins	Episode "With You I'm Born Again"
2010	The Defenders	Judge Lowery	Episode "Nevada v. Killa Diz"
2011	Desperate Housewives	City Councilwoman	Episode "The Art of Making Art"
2012	CSI: Crime Scene Investigation	Amelia Gross	Episode "Ms. Willows Regrets"
2012	Think Like a Man	Candace's Mom	
2012	Awake	Dora	Episode "Kate Is Enough"
2012	Melissa & Joey	Woman Customer	Episode "The Knockout"
2012	Operation Cupcake	Middle Aged Woman	TV Movie
2012	1600 Penn	HHS Secretary	Episode "Putting Out Fires"
2013	Parenthood	Mary	Episode "Because You're My Sister"
2013	Rizzoli & Isles	Shirley Ghetts	Episode "Dance with the Devil"
2013	Scandal	Judge Eleanor Gaynes	Episode "Say Hello to My Little Friend"
2014	Think Like a Man Too	Adele	
2014-2015	The Fosters	Michelle	5 episodes
2014-2019	Black Jesus	Ms. Tudi	Main role; 31 episodes
2015	Revenge	A.D.A. Ganz	2 episodes
2015	Straight Outta Compton	Doris Jackson	
2016	American Crime Story	Barbara Cochran	2 episodes
2016	Shameless	Vicki Bates	Episode "Hiraeth"
2017	Insecure		Episode "Hella Shook"
2018	Love Jacked	Aunt Clara	
2018	Suits	Anna Reed	Episode "Promises, Promises"
2018	A Simple Wedding	Doris	
2018-2020	On My Block	Rose Westbrook	4 episodes
2019	NCIS	Eden Penzance	Episode "Toil and Trouble"
2020	S.W.A.T.	Othella Baker	2 episodes
2020	NCIS: Los Angeles	Ellen	Episode "Murder of Crows"
2021	This Is Us	Older Laurel	Episode "Birth Mother"
2021	Station 19	Ms. Debbie	Episode "Can't Feel My Face"
2021–2025	Hacks	Robin	Recurring role
2022	9-1-1: Lone Star	Sylvia	Episode "The ATS-Files"
2023–2024	Not Dead Yet	Cricket	Main role; 14 episodes
2026	Chicago Med	Grace Evans	Episode: "Frost on Fire"
2026	Michael	Nurse Bernadette	
