= S. L. Stebel =

American writer and creative writing teacher (1923–2020)

Sidney L. Stebel
- Born: Sidney Leo Stebel; June 28, 1923; Sioux City, Iowa
- Died: July 28, 2020 (aged 97); Los Angeles, California
- Occupation: Author

Sidney Leo Stebel (June 28, 1923 – July 28, 2020) was an American writer and creative writing teacher, associated with Ray Bradbury. He was script consultant to the 1975 film Picnic at Hanging Rock. He wrote the scripts for The Small World: "The Gypsy Children of Granada" and Perilous Voyage, in collaboration with Robert Weverka. He died in July 2020 at the age of 97.

== Works ==
- The Small World: "The Gypsy Children of Granada" with Robert Weverka Television Pilot (1963)
- Perilous Voyage with Robert Weverka Television movie (1968)
- The Collaborator (1968)
- The Shoe Leather Treatment (1980)
