= The Swordsman (1992 film) =

1992 film by Michael Kennedy

- Canadian release art
- Directed by: Michael Kennedy
- Written by: Michael Kennedy
- Produced by: Nicolas Stiliadis
- Starring: Lorenzo Lamas; Claire Stansfield; Michael Champion; Nicholas Pasco; Raoul Max Trujillo
- Cinematography: Ludek Bogner
- Edited by: Nick Rotundo
- Music by: Domenic Troiano
- Production company: SC Entertainment International
- Distributed by: Cinépix/Famous Players
- Release date: December 4, 1992
- Running time: 91 minutes
- Country: Canada
- Language: English

The Swordsman is a 1992 Canadian fantasy action film written and directed by Michael Kennedy and starring Lorenzo Lamas, Claire Stansfield and Michael Champion. Lamas stars as a police detective tasked with finding a stolen sword said to have once belonged to Alexander the Great, while coming to grips with the fact that he may well be the reincarnation of said ancient monarch.

== Plot ==
Andrew Garrett is a tormented police detective, known in his precinct for clairvoyant abilities, which tend to reawaken in the presence of corpses, although his colleagues are unsure what to make of them. Meanwhile, historian Julie Wilkins discovers that a crate, which awaited her at a storage warehouse, has been plundered in a botched heist that left a guard dead. Inside the crate was an antique sword, said to have been gifted by the god Apollo to the Macedonian king and legendary conqueror, Alexander the Great. She is seen by the criminals but narrowly evades them and reports to the police.

Garrett is assigned to the case. In addition, he is tasked with protecting Julie, which she initially disagrees with, although she later warms up to him. Garrett soon starts experiencing cryptic flashbacks, which take him to the age of Alexander two millennia prior, and seem to be related to the missing sword. Coincidentally, he also happens to have a real-life affinity for fencing, which he competes in. Following a tournament win, Garrett is handed a business card belonging to Stratos, a powerful man who stages underground sword fighting tournaments and wants him to take part in them.

== Cast ==
- Lorenzo Lamas as Det. Andrew Garrett
- Claire Stansfield as Julie Wilkins
- Michael Champion as Stratos
- Nicholas Pasco as Nick
- Raoul Max Trujillo as Jojo
- Eugene Clark as Police Captain
- Michael Copeman as Therapist
- George Touliatos as Chris
- Frank Crudele as Leo
- Ian White as Swordplay Announcer
- Scott Davis as Trevor Hobbs
- Zack Kotlyar as Bora

== Production ==
=== Cancelled shoot ===
An early incarnation of The Swordsman was in the works with Michael Kennedy already attached to direct, but with Michael Paré and Robert Davi in the starring roles. According to Davi in a May 1990 item, he was going to play Stratos. However, in that version, his character was the one reincarnated from Alexander the Great, as well as the swashbuckling head of an eponymous shipping company. The original pitch proclaimed that the hero had "24 hours to unravel 2000 years of mystery". The shoot was slated to begin on September 15, 1990, but that version did not materialize.

=== Relaunch ===
The picture that saw release was filmed in the Toronto, Ontario, area between October 7 and November 19, 1991. During photography, it was given the title In Search of Alexander, although it later reverted to its original moniker of The Swordsman. It marked the first feature film leading role of actress Claire Stansfield, as well as her first intimate scene, for which she praised co-star Lorenzo Lamas' professionalism. The former model felt that her height, which exceeded that of many male stars, had previously confined her to antagonistic roles.

Robert Seale, a theater professor at Toronto's York University with a specialization in dramatic sword fighting, recruited the fencers and choreographed the swashbuckling action. Seale also doubled for the main antagonist played by Michael Champion. Building on that experience, he went on to co-found a new Canadian fight choreographers association, Fight Directors Canada, the following year.

== Release ==
=== Pre-release ===
The film was screened for industry professionals at the 1992 American Film Market, held from February 27 to March 6, 1992, in Santa Monica, California. Another private screening was staged for the Canadian crew and their guests on March 28, 1992, in Toronto.

=== Theatrical ===
In its native Canada, The Swordsman debuted in Montreal on December 4, 1992, and opened in Toronto a week later on December 11.

=== Home media ===
The Swordsman arrived on VHS on February 17, 1993, in both Canada and the U.S. It was distributed by C/FP Video in Canada, and Republic Pictures Home Video in the U.S. The latter also issued a LaserDisc version of the film on the same day.

== Reception ==
=== Commercial ===
A market study by U.S. trade publication Video Store Magazine was quoted as reporting that The Swordsman generated a 68,4 percent return on investment for rental outlets.

=== Critical ===
The film's reception has been mostly negative. John Griffin, resident critic for The Montreal Gazette, granted that The Swordsman offered "many exciting fencing scenes— making this a must-see movie for all you fencing addicts— before we get past parry and thrust and down to the movie's short strokes", concluding that the film was let down by confusing character motivations. The Toronto Star was more negative, finding the film "more or less idiotic from start to finish". The paper also criticized Stansfield, "who can neither act nor react convincingly", but praised Michael Copeland (misidentified in the review as Nicholas Pasco) as Lamas' psychiatrist. TV Guide was on the fence, writing that the film was "not a disaster" and its "premise may be clever, but its execution is right off the action flick assembly line." The magazine added that "the swordplay is a relief after an overdose of kickboxing spectacles, but not that thrilling in and of itself."

== Second version and sequel ==
Producer Nicolas Stiliadis followed The Swordsman with two other films based on the same premise. In 1994 came Gladiator Cop, a new version of the original film which has sometimes been promoted as a sequel under the title Gladiator Cop: The Swordsman II. It was controversial, as it reused much of Lorenzo Lamas' footage from the first film in the context of a similar, yet different storyline that sometimes contradicted that of its predecessor. In 1999, another film called G-2 was released, which starred Daniel Bernhardt and followed the Gladiator Cop continuity.
