= Racism in martial arts =

Racism in martial arts has been a common allegation.

== Media portrayal ==
Some of this can be attributed to media portrayal of minority groups while giving the majority a primary role. Television shows such as Mighty Morphin Power Rangers have been called racist for alleged ethnic stereotyping; however, in the case of Power Rangers, African-American actor Walter Emanuel Jones attributed it to coincidence. The web television series Iron Fist, based on the comic book character of the same name, centers around a white protagonist who learns mystical Asian martial arts to fight crime, typically against Asian antagonists; the show's premise has drawn accusations of cultural appropriation, white savior narrative, Orientalism and yellow peril stereotyping. Movies such as The Forbidden Kingdom and Birth of the Dragon have drawn similar accusations as well.

Quite often the media would portray Asians as being proficient in martial arts while lacking other defining qualities. Ethnic groups and ethnic martial arts would be merged into one although they might be quite distinct. However, martial arts shows such as Into the Badlands and Warrior have been praised for avoiding and subverting stereotypes that have commonly plagued Asian martial artists in western media.

== Alleged instances ==
Bruce Lee stated that racism was widely practiced in martial arts in Hong Kong. Ron Duncan (an Afro-Panamanian), a founder of ninjitsu in America, discussed in detail the problems of racism in martial arts as he saw them. Duncan explained how he believes he was denied recognition by Black Belt magazine in favor of Stephen K. Hayes (who was white). The Black Karate Federation was formed by Steve Sanders and others seeking to have equal treatment of black fighters in karate tournaments. This included allegations of biased officiating in martial arts tournaments.

== Current times ==
Fighters such as Maurice Smith and Kevin Randleman were amongst the first black champions in MMA, but neither have received the media attention that fighters of other races have. Joe Rogan of the UFC has suggested that Jon Jones, a UFC light heavyweight champion, is not as popular as he could be due in large part to racism.

== See also ==
- Racism in sport
