= Gladiator Cop =

1994 film by Nick Rotundo

- Canadian poster
- Directed by: Nick Rotundo
- Written by: Nick Rotundo; Paco Alvarez; Nicolas Stiliadis
- Produced by: Nicolas Stiliadis; Paco Alvarez; Syd Cappe (executive); Don Schneider (executive)
- Starring: Lorenzo Lamas; James Hong; George Touliatos; Claire Stansfield; Christopher Lee Clements; Nicholas Pasco
- Cinematography: Edgar Egger
- Edited by: Nick Rotundo
- Music by: Alun Davies; Guy Zerafa
- Production company: SC Entertainment
- Distributed by: Alliance Communications (Canada); Monarch Home Entertainment (U.S.)
- Release dates: December 9, 1994 (Canada); August 8, 1995 (U.S.)
- Running time: 92 minutes
- Countries: Canada; United States
- Language: English

Gladiator Cop, also known as Gladiator Cop: The Swordsman II, is a 1994 Canadian-American fantasy action film directed by Nick Rotundo, starring Lorenzo Lamas, James Hong, George Touliatos and Claire Stansfield. While branded as a sequel in some territories, it is a reboot of 1992's The Swordsman, and reuses a significant amount of footage from that film.

Hong stars as a high roller seeking to reunite a priceless sword with its rightful owner, psychic detective Andrew Garrett (Lamas in a stock footage appearance), so that the latter can do battle with his champion, and settle a rivalry that started millennia ago when their respective spirits inhabited the bodies of general Parmenion and his archrival Alexander the Great.

== Plot ==
Museum director Chris Kilos counts in his collection a prized sword, rumored to have belonged to Alexander the Great himself, and to grant protection to its bearer thanks to a blessing from the god Apollo. However, the respected administrator spends his nights betting on high stakes fights to the death organized in the city's seedy underbelly. Kilos organizes the robbery of his own exhibit by his henchman, the cruel Jodar, during which several guards are killed and the sword disappears. Police detective Nick Milano, who is in charge of the case, immediately suspects an inside job.

Meanwhile, his teammate Andrew Barrett remains at home, haunted by cryptic visions of a distant past, a supernatural ability his colleague are aware of but struggle to accept. However, he is called by his girlfriend Julie, a historian and employee of the museum, who tells him that the sword has been stolen. Barrett shows up at the police headquarters, but is informed by Milano that he has not been entrusted with the case. He feigns to accept his superiors' decision, but secretly decides to continue his investigation on his own with the help of Julie.

Meanwhile, Kilos has entered his man Jodar into the tournament and given him the sword for protection, which he expects will help him beat all the odds. Meanwhile, a stranger calling himself Parmenion shows up at the fights with a champion of his own, The Mongol. He challenges Kilos to a duel between both men's proteges, with the sword as prize, as he knows it has been stolen and wants to see it in the hands of a more worthy warrior, who is destined to wield it. Only a victory by The Mongol against the sword's rightful owner will allow Parmenion to realize his age-old destiny.

== Cast ==
- Lorenzo Lamas as Det. Andrew Barrett (stock footage only)
- James Hong as Parmenion
- Claire Stansfield as Julie Wilkins (stock footage only)
- George Touliatos as Chris Kilos
- Christopher Lee Clements as Jodar
- Nicholas Pasco as Nick Milano
- Garry Robbins as The Mongol
- Mark Foreman as The Gladiator (stand-in for Lorenzo Lamas)
- Louie Janetta as Announcer
- Harold Howard as Rebel
- Astrid Falconi as Muscle Woman
- Eugene Clark as Police Captain (stock footage only)

== Production ==
Gladiator Cop, which is directed by The Swordsman's editor Nick Rotundo, repurposes much footage from that film as well as some outtakes, most notably the scenes featuring Lamas' character and his love interest played by Claire Stansfield. Some of the supporting actors from 1992 were brought back to link the old material with the new, such as Nicholas Pasco, whose return compounded the story's retcon as his character died in the original. Fresh scenes also included veteran actor James Hong as Alexander's rival Parmenion, and a new fighting tournament featuring more diverse combatants, such as former pro wrestler Gary Robbins and UFC fighters Harold Howard and Gary Goodridge. As Lamas was not asked to reprise his role, his character espouses a gladiator persona during fights, which enables him to wear a partial face mask, concealing the use of a double named in the credits as Mark Foreman. With Michael Janetta performing casting duties, the fight announcer was played by family patriach Louie Janetta, a longtime maitre d' at the Royal York hotel and a minor celebrity thanks to his many customers within the entertainment industry.

Filming of the new footage took place during the month of January 1994 in the Toronto metropolitan area. SC Entertainment, the company behind Gladiator Cop and its predecessor, was in seemingly poor standing with the local movie community by that time, and the shoot was scarcely publicized. Karen Mazurkewich, beat writer for trade magazine Playback, wrote: "Why does everyone groan when I mention Paco Alvarez is back shooting a low-budget feature? I guess the SC legacy is just hard to shake.[...] The company created for the production is Cork Town Films [sic], at least I think it is. The person answering the phone identifies it as Cork Town Films, but claims he has no idea what the company is doing."

=== Legal proceedings ===
Prior to the shoot, the legal entity used for the film's production, Corktown Productions, applied for subsidies with the Ontario Film Development Corporation (OFDC), a provincial film incentive program. Those funds were initially approved, but upon further examination, the OFDC noticed that a large amount of content was recycled from a previous work, which put the filming dates for Gladiator Cop outside of the timeframe allowed to qualify for assistance. As a consequence, the grant was rescinded. Undeterred, Corktown sued the OFDC for payment. However, a court found against the company in October 1996, as the initial OFDC decision was specifically described as provisional and subject to further considerations.

Lorenzo Lamas, who starred in the original The Swordsman, was also blindsided by the use of his old scenes in the second film, whose existence he only learned about when he read about it in a trade publication. The actor threatened to sue the production who, in exchange for him dropping his lawsuit, accepted to pay him the same fee they had given him for the first film, even though he did not end up contributing any new footage.

== Release ==
=== Pre-release ===
The film was among Canadian productions promoted at the May 1994 Cannes Film Market. According to a freelancer who worked on the film, it was originally projected for a Summer 1994 release date in Canada.

=== Theatrical ===
The film opened theatrically in Toronto on December 9, 1994, as just Gladiator Cop.

=== Home media ===
For its North American video release, the film used the title Gladiator Cop: The Swordsman II. In the U.S., the film was released on August 8, 1995, by Monarch Home Entertainment. The Canadian edition arrived six weeks later courtesy of Alliance Video.

== Reception ==
Gerald Pratley, author of the book A Century of Canadian Cinema, had little good to say about the film or its controversial backers, assessing: "The audience must [...] suffer the most boring and ridiculous story about Alexander the Great's ancient sword. A time waster. But then why should we expect anything more from producer and part scriptwriter Nicolas Stiliadis? Ballantine Books' Video Movie Guide wrote that this "[p]assable action-fantasy is held up by decent acting and stunt work, but holds little interest in the way of story." TV Guide dismissed the film as "just an updated sword-and-sandal flick" and an "uninspired rehash", adding that "[c]onsidering its imaginative jumping-off point, Gladiator Cop disappoints by covering the same ground as the first Swordsman before it degenerates into just another fight-to-the-death plot line."

== Sequel ==
Producer Nicolas Stiliadis teamed with Nick Rotundo yet again to create G-2, a true second installment to the series, which loosely follows the alternate continuity established by Gladiator Cop. This time, a new hero played by Daniel Bernhardt is introduced as the reincarnation of one of Alexander's top soldiers rather than the king himself, while Hong returns as Parmenion. The film was released in the U.S. on December 28, 1999.
