= Tino Tuiolosega =

American martial artist (1931–2011)

- Born: Tu'umamao "Tino" Tuiolosega; July 2, 1931; Utulei, American Samoa
- Died: March 22, 2011 (aged 79); Santa Cruz, California
- Style: Limalama
- Rank: Founder and Senior Grand Master
- Years active: 1950−2011

Other information
- Occupation: Martial artist

Tu'umamao "Tino" Tuiolosega (2 July 1931 – 22 March 2011) was an American Samoan martial arts Grandmaster who founded the self-defense system of Limalama.

== Early life and education ==
Tuiolosega was born 2 July 1931 in Utulei, American Samoa, the son of Tu'umamao Tuiolosega, the king of Olosega and Saposapoaluga Feagaimaleata Poumele Tuiolosega. When he was 5-years-old, he began learning Polynesian self-defense techniques from his father and uncle. Tuiolosega also learned Polynesian dances which he said he later incorporated into his fighting style. In addition, Tuiolosega studied aikido, Shaolin kung fu, Choy Li Fut and Hung Ga. After moving to Oahu, Hawaii, he attended the University of Hawaii. Tuilosega earned a juris doctor from the Irvine College of Law in 1979.

== Career ==
Tuiolosega joined the United States Marine Corps during the Korean War and fought at the Battle of Inchon. He later served as the Marine Corps' Chief Instructor of hand-to-hand combat. He also boxed for the Marines and was the Armed Forces Middleweight Champion. Tuiolosega practiced his martial art skills as a street fighter around the docks and bars of Hawaii.

After moving to Southern California in the 1950s, Tuiolosega began developing his own martial arts system called Limalama, a portmanteau of the Polynesian words lima (hand) and malamalama (understanding) and defined by Tuiolosega as "hand of wisdom". The system eventually incorporated elements based on Tuilosega's experiences with Polynesian self-defense, boxing, judo, aikido, Shaolin kung fu, Choy Li Fut, Hung Ga and Kenpo karate. Tuiolosega worked out with other martial artists including Kenpo Karate innovator Ed Parker and Shaolin Kung Fu grandmaster Ark Yuey Wong. In 1965, he began teaching Limalama to a group of black belts including Richard Nunez, Saul Esquival, John Makaalu Louis, Solomon Kaihewalu, and his cousin, Haumea “Tiny” Lefiti. By the 1970s, students of Tuiolosega had opened Limalama academies around the world mostly concentrated in Mexico, South and Central America, as well as California and Hawaii.

In the 1980s, he moved to Santa Cruz, California and continued to instruct select students in Limalama.

== Personal life ==
Tuiolosega was married to Claire Punani Nelson Tuiolosega with whom he had ten children. He married a second time, to Adele Tuiolosega Radicchi, with whom he had one child. He suffered a stroke in 1994 but recovered. Tuiolosega died in Santa Cruz on 22 March 2011.
