= Michael Champion =

American singer and actor (1946–2021)

Michael Edward Campbell Champion (November 3, 1946, in Anderson, Indiana – June 16, 2021) was an American singer and actor who started his public career in Detroit. In 1967, with a short-lived band called 'The Abstract Reality', he released a 45 rpm single called "Love Burns Like A Fire Inside". With Bob 'Babbitt' Kreinar, Ray Monette and Andrew Smith he formed Scorpion. His name appears as Mike Campbell on the album Scorpion and Meat Loaf's debut album Stoney & Meatloaf (1971). For this recording, apart from having co-written four songs, he played the harmonica on Lady Be Mine.

He became an actor by the name of Michael Champion and since 1979 played in several TV series and films such as Diagnosis Murder (1993), Matlock (1989), and The Flash (1991, as Captain Cold), History of the World: Part I (1981), Beverly Hills Cop (1984), Total Recall (1990) and Toy Soldiers (1991), and video game characters like the terrorist in Flash Traffic: City of Angels (1994) and 'Wolf' in Maximum Surge (1996). Musician and record co-producer Ralph Terrana has been quoted: "He [Campbell] was a very talented writer. He also could be a little unusual. We called him Crazy Mike."

== Filmography ==
Year	Title	Role	Notes
1979	When a Stranger Calls	Bill	
1979	10	Party Guest #7	
1980	Wholly Moses!	Sodom Sentry	
1981	History of the World: Part I	Prehistoric Man	
1981	The Woman Inside	Nolan	
1984	Beverly Hills Cop	Casey	
1987	Fatal Beauty	"Buzz"	
1989	Pink Cadillac	Ken Lee	
1989	One Man Out	Burkhardt	
1990	Total Recall	Agent Helm	
1990	False Identity	Luther	
1991	Toy Soldiers	Jack Thorpe	
1992	Leather Jackets	Costello	
1992	The Swordsman	Stratos	
1995	Evolver	Squad Leader	
1995	Aurora: Operation Intercept	Johann Wells	
