= Robert Weverka =

Author

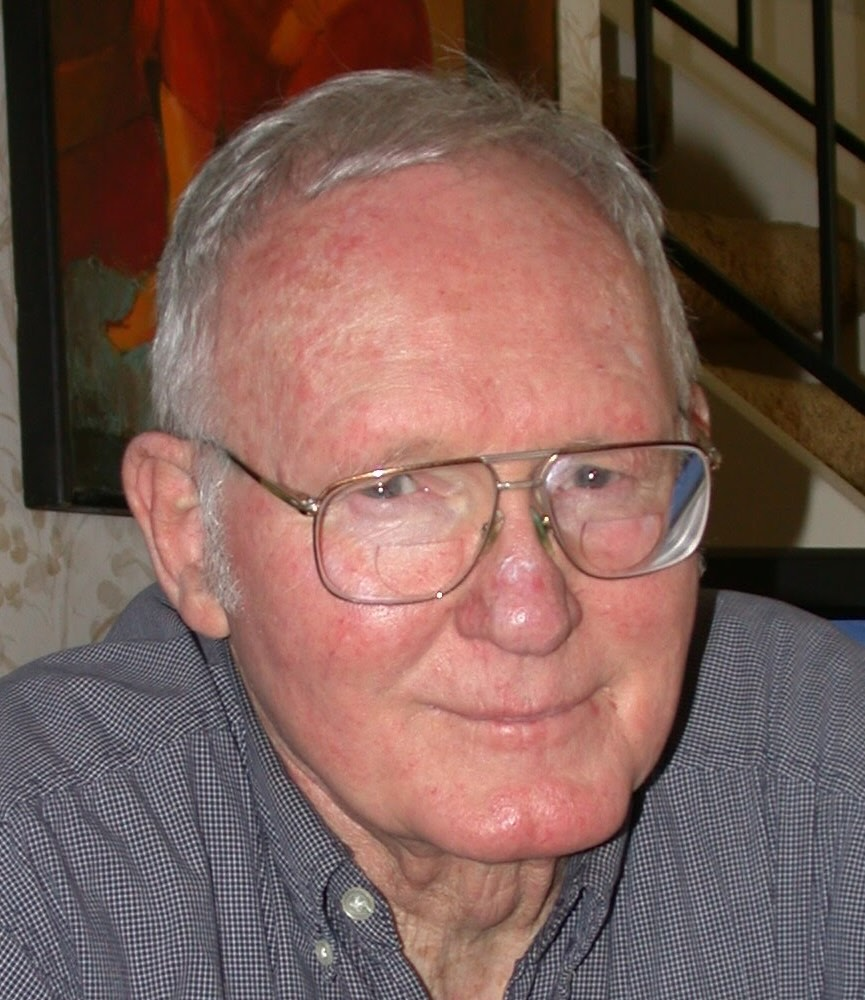
- Born: Robert Archie Weverka; November 17, 1926; Los Angeles, California
- Died: May 19, 2009 (aged 82); Pinole, California
- Occupation: Author
- Notable work: The Sting

Robert Weverka (November 17, 1926 – May 19, 2009) was an American novel writer, and scriptwriter in collaboration with S. L. Stebel (Perilous Voyage (film) 1976, The Small World: "The Gypsy Children of Granada" 1963).

From the One Minute to Eternity dust jacket: Robert Weverka was born in Los Angeles, is a graduate of the University of Southern California, and lives in Idyllwild, from whence he commutes to the advertising agency in Beverly Hills of which he is president. He spent two years in Mexico and was awarded three days in jail there for stealing a train in the town of Colima and driving it to Guadalajara. He now leads a more ordinary life, inspired, no doubt, by his wife, Ethel, and their five children.

He wrote numerous novelizations from movie scripts as well as original stories based on the television show The Waltons. His novelizations include Spectre, I Love My Wife, The Sting and Hangar 18. He died in May 2009 at the age of 82.

== Works ==
- The Small World: "The Gypsy Children of Granada" with S. L. Stebel Television Pilot (1963)
- Perilous Voyage with S. L. Stebel Television movie (1968)
- One Minute to Eternity (1969)
- I Love My Wife (January 1971) Based on the screenplay by Robert Kaufman, I Love My Wife (film)
- The Sting (1974) Based on the screenplay by David S. Ward, The Sting
- The Boogens with Charles Sellier, The Boogens
- Search based on the TV movie Probe, pilot for the seriesSearch, screenplay by Leslie Stevens
- Moonrock (1973) based on the episode of that title from the TV series Search teleplay by Leslie Stevens
- Griff (1973) Based on the television series Griff (TV series) ISBN 0553083392
- The Genius (1975) The Waltons, season 4 episode 2, List of The Waltons episodes
- The Waltons Original story by Robert Weverka based on the characters by Earl Hamner Jr.
- The Waltons: The Easter Story Original story by Robert Weverka based on the characters by Earl Hamner Jr.
- The Waltons: The Genius Season 4, Episode 2.
- The Waltons: Trouble on the Mountain Original story by Robert Weverka based on the characters by Earl Hamner Jr.
- Apple's Way Original story by Robert Weverka based on the characters by Earl Hamner Jr., Apple's Way
- Spectre Based on the screenplay by Sam Peeples & Gene Roddenberry Spectre (1977 film)
- March or die (1977) Based on the screenplay by David Zelag Goodman March or Die (film)
- Avalanche July 1978 Based on the screenplay by Claude Pola. Avalanche (1978 film)
- The Magic of Lassie Based on the screenplay by Jean Holloway, Robert B. Sherman & Richard M. Sherman. The Magic of Lassie
- Circle of Iron based on the screenplay by Stirling Silliphant and Stanley Mann Circle of Iron
- For the Love of Benji written by Robert Weverka under the pseudonym I.F.Love, based on the screenplay For the Love of Benji
- Murder by decree Based on the screenplay by John Hopkins Murder by Decree.
- Hangar 18 Based on the screenplay by Steven Thornley Hangar 18, with Charles Sellier
- The Story of Bill A novelization based on the teleplays Bill and Bill on his own, by Barry Morrow and Corey Blechman.
- A Lily for Lila (January 1985)
