= Leather Jackets (film) =

- Release poster
- Directed by: Lee Drysdale
- Written by: Lee Drysdale
- Produced by: Cassian Elwes
- Starring: D.B. Sweeney; Bridget Fonda; Cary Elwes
- Cinematography: James Chressanthis
- Edited by: Ned Humphreys
- Music by: Shlomo Artzi
- Distributed by: Triumph Films
- Release date: 1992
- Running time: 90 minutes
- Country: United States
- Language: English

Leather Jackets is a 1992 American drama film directed and written by Lee Drysdale in his directorial debut. It was shot in Highland Park, Los Angeles, California in 1990. The film stars D. B. Sweeney, Bridget Fonda and Cary Elwes.

== Plot ==
Ex-con Mickey (D.B. Sweeney) decides to go straight, work a legitimate blue-collar job and ask his friend Claudi (Bridget Fonda) to marry him. Unfortunately, before the wedding can happen and the couple can finally leave their one-horse town, their troubled pal Dobbs (Cary Elwes) arrives and begs his buddies to help him escape from a deadly gang that he recently crossed. Soon, the mobsters track down Claudi, Mickey and Dobbs, and the unlucky trio must then run for their lives.

== Cast ==
- D. B. Sweeney as Mickey
- Bridget Fonda as Claudi
- Judy Trevor as Mrs. Little
- Cary Elwes as Dobbs
- James LeGros as Carl
- Neil Giuntoli as Sammy
- Phil Chong as Vietnamese Bookie
- Jeff Imada as Hood #1
- Al Goto as Hood #2
- April Tran as Vietnamese Grocer
- Jon Polito as Jack "Fat Jack"
- Joe Lewis as Barfly
- Heather Haase as Student Girl #1 (Julie)
- Mary Ella Ross as Student Girl #2
- Michael Champion as Costello
- Marshall Bell as The Stranger
- Chris Penn as Steve "Big Steve"
- Craig Ng as Tron
- Bill Ryusaki as Prath
- Arielle Elwes as "Baby"
- Lisanne Falk as Shanna
- Viper as Connie
- Ginger Lynn Allen as Bree
- Tony Cecere as Pimp
- Darryl Chan as Su
- Alicia Allain-Ryder as "Jingles"
- Lee Drysdale as A Waiter
- B. Lee Drew as Tall Cop #1
- Dee Dee Brown as Party Girl #2
