= I Love My Wife (film) =

1970 film by Mel Stuart

- Film poster
- Directed by: Mel Stuart
- Written by: Robert Kaufman
- Produced by: Stan Margulies
- Starring: Elliott Gould; Brenda Vaccaro; Angel Tompkins
- Cinematography: Vilis Lapenieks
- Edited by: David Saxon
- Music by: Lalo Schifrin
- Production company: Wolper Pictures Ltd.
- Distributed by: Universal Pictures
- Release date: December 21, 1970 (New York)
- Running time: 98 minutes
- Country: United States
- Language: English

I Love My Wife, stylized as I Love My...Wife, is a 1970 American comedy film directed by Mel Stuart. It stars Elliott Gould, Brenda Vaccaro, and Angel Tompkins.

== Plot ==
Richard Burrows is a medical student with a pregnant wife, Jody, who becomes unappealing to him before and after childbirth; she abstains from sex and gains weight. When her mother moves in with them, Richard's home life frustrates him even more.

Flirtations with nurses and patients begin, with Jody catching him being unfaithful. But after he becomes a surgeon at a Los Angeles hospital, the infidelity continues. Richard meets a married model, Helene Donnelly, and begins meeting her secretly in motels. They contemplate getting divorces.

Richard decides to make one last attempt to save his marriage. He evicts his mother-in-law from the premises and persuades Jody to go to a weight-loss center. When his wife returns, she is slim and beautiful again and Richard is pleased, until learning that now she wants a divorce.

== Cast ==
- Elliott Gould as Dr. Richard Burrows
- Brenda Vaccaro as Jody Burrows
- Angel Tompkins as Helene Donnelly
- Dabney Coleman as Frank Donnelly
- Leonard Stone as Dr. Neilson
- Joan Tompkins as Grandma Dennison
- Helen Westcott as Mrs. Burrows
- Ivor Francis as Dr. Korngold
- Joanna Cameron as Nurse Sharon
- Veleka Gray as Stewardess
- Damian London as Leslie
- Tom Toner as John Bosley
- Gloria Manon as Prostitute
- Dawn Lyn as Stephanie
- Heather North as Betty
- Janice Pennington as Nurse Cynthia
- Robert Kaufman as Devil

== Production ==
The film was originally known as Three Women and was based on an original story by Robert Kaufman. In December 1967 the story was purchased by David Wolper, a television producer who had moved into feature film production. The script was finished by October and in December 1968 Wolper announced the film would be made as part of a slate of films worth $45 million.

In April 1969 David Wolper announced he would make the film with Mel Stuart to direct and Stan Marguiles to produce. They had just finished If It's Tuesday, This Must Be Belgium for Wolper. In July Wolper signed a deal with Universal to distribute Three Women which was retitled I Love My Wife.

Gould signed to make the film in December 1969. (He had just completed Getting Straight, based on a script by Kaufman). Brenda Vaccaro also starred with Angel Tompkins and Dabney Coleman in supporting roles.

Gould turned down McCabe & Mrs. Miller to do the film. "The more successful the character seemed to be, as a product of our socioeconomic society, the shallower he became as a human being,” said Gould. “I wanted to be able to experience that.” Filming took place in early 1970.

== Reception ==
The film was a commercial and critical disaster. “It was the first time I got a poor review in the trades, and I felt they were reviewing the character and not me,” Gould said. “He ended up alone, and it was very sad. It got some good reviews. I know Charles Champlin liked it a lot.”

A. H. Weiler of The New York Times thought that the romance, "running down aimlessly from a promising start, ends nowhere as the indecisive medico is seen in the process of making another quick conquest." Arthur D. Murphy of Variety wrote that the film "blows its impact after about two zesty reels, and the Universal release meanders to a conclusion which leaves no leading characters with any real audience sympathy. Brenda Vaccaro's featured performance is excellent though not in context with Robert Kaufman's poorly-structured, but well-dialogued original screenplay." Charles Champlin of the Los Angeles Times, as Gould accurately recalled, praised the film as "a harshly funny picture. The young Gould ... is once again an expert comic actor with an ability to move naturally from overstatement to understatement, from farce to naturalism." Gene Siskel of the Chicago Tribune also liked the film, giving it three stars out of four and writing, "When 'I Love My Wife' turns from comedy to commentary the pace slackens and the movie seems overly long at 95 minutes. But unlike the much more flashy 'Diary of a Mad Housewife' there is an intelligence to this effort. Gould is restrained, a quality he often lacks."

Gould said, “It’s the only feature that I’ve done for Universal. And when Universal bought back all the rights to it, they came to me. It was post- A Glimpse of Tiger and I had no money, and they wanted to buy my percentage of the film back. And they offered, for all I know it was either $1,500, $7,500, or $15,000. And I said, ‘I can’t even buy a new car with that!’ So I was the only one outside Universal that retained a right. I made more money than they offered me.”

== Awards ==
Angel Tompkins received a Golden Globe nomination for this role in the category of Best Newcomer - Female.

== Novelization ==
- I Love My Wife, ISBN 0553059203, Bantam Books, 1971, Robert Weverka

== See also ==
- List of American films of 1970
