= Steve Sanders (karate) =

American martial artist (born 1939)

Sijo Saabir Quwi Muhammad (born Steve Sanders; July 2, 1939) is an American martial artist and police officer.

== Early life ==
Sanders was born in Indianola, Mississippi on July 2, 1939. He was the youngest of several siblings. As a youth, he learned tai chi. He attended Kansas State University on a Football Scholarship. Sanders joined the Marines, where he was exposed to Gōjū-ryū karate. He served in the Vietnam War while in the Marines. Afterwards, he worked as a security officer for Los Angeles County, California.

== Career ==
Despite racism during the era, Sanders became a champion fighter. He won many state and national titles. Sanders is said to have had the fastest hands in karate. Sanders earned his black belt from Dan Inosanto and Chuck Sullivan. Sanders faced Chuck Norris and holds wins in Ed Parkers Long Beach Internationals. Sanders developed the five speed theory and the 12 basic moves of kenpō. Sanders founded the Black Karate Federation.

In 1982, Sanders joined the Nation of Islam and changed his last name to Muhammad. He would as a result convert to Islam. Sanders played the instructor of Jim Kelly in Enter the Dragon. Sanders received the Battle of Atlanta Hall of Fame award in 2012. Sanders was nominated to the Black Belt magazine hall of fame. Sanders holds a 10th degree black belt. He is the author of Bkf Kenpo: History and Advanced Strategic Principles. Sanders appeared in the 1982 training video World Of Martial Arts with Benny Urquidez, Chuck Norris and John Saxon. His student Ray Wizard fought in UFC 2.

== See also ==
- Racism in martial arts

== Sources ==
- Sanders, Steve; Williams, Donnie (November 1994). "Black Belt". Black Belt. Buyer's Guide. Active Interest Media, Inc. ISSN 0277-3066.
