= The Woman Inside =

1981 US film

- Directed by: Joseph Van Winkle
- Written by: Joseph Van Winkle; Steve Fisher
- Produced by: Sidney H. Levine
- Cinematography: Ron Johanson
- Edited by: John Duffy
- Music by: Eddy Lawrence Manson & Leo Köppen
- Production company: 20th Century Fox
- Distributed by: 20th Century Fox
- Release date: September 1981
- Running time: 94 minutes
- Country: United States
- Language: English

The Woman Inside is a 1981 drama film directed by Joseph Van Winkle who co-wrote the screenplay with Steve Fisher. The film stars Gloria Manon, Leo Köppen, Dane Clark, Michael Champion and Joan Blondell, which was Blondell's last movie she appeared in before her death in 1979.

== Plot ==
The film portrays the actions of a tough Vietnam veteran who is experiencing intense gender dysphoria and wants to have gender-affirming surgery. Her aunt, who does not approve, struggles to understand why she would want do such a thing.

After meeting with the Doctor, she starts hormone therapy, attends classes where she meets other people like her, and then has the surgery. In the end, she moves to San Francisco, where she meets a man who might just be the right one.

== Cast ==
- Gloria Manon as Holly/Hollis
- Leo Köppen as Dr. Poeppen
- Dane Clark as Dr. Rosner
- Joan Blondell as Aunt Coll
- Michael Champion as Nolan
- Marlene Tracy as Dr. Parris
- Michael Mancini as Marco
- Luce Morgan as Maggie
- Terri Haven as Agnes
- Joe E. Ross as Cab Driver
- Jackie Vernon as Casey

== Production ==
Manon said that "the experience was disastrous, there was no direction, Van Winkle decided to just leave it to the actors." Manon recalled that Van Winkle disrespected Blondell, by ignoring her needs for comfort and rest. The movie was the last picture that Blondell appeared in, and it was released after her death in 1979.

== Reception ==
Laurie Ann from LadyLike magazine wrote "it portrays Hollis/Holly and sex change surgery in a positive mature fashion; it avoids being clinical and spares us from the gruesome details of the surgery; intead the film focuses on some of the critical issues that a TS faces in making the transition from male to female."

Critic Jacqi Tully was disappointed with the film, stating, "the movie is silly, poorly made and confusing; and it is shallow; you will know nothing more about transsexuals after the film than before it." American journalist Michael Musto from The Village Voice called it "a bizarrely earnest, yet at the same time, deeply trashy 1981 drive-in-caliber film."

Veronica Brown wrote in The TV-TS Tapestry that while "the film takes the viewer through the anguish, suffering and frustration of a gender dysphoric Hollis; in comparison to reality, the major flaw in the film was the miraculous physical transformation undergone by Hollis to Holly after only six months of hormone therapy."

Author Susan Nash opined "it frequently fails to establish a believable base somewhere between the extremes of Vietnam and sex reassignment surgery; it also suffers as a cheaply made film; despite almost total darkness, the Vietnam scenes are not credible; the pun on Ho//ywood hardly compensates for the third-rate travelogue patched in when Hollis returns, and the romantic conclusion in San Francisco isn’t much better."

== Home media ==
The movie was released on VHS by Simitar Entertainment in 1985.

== See also ==
- List of feature films with transgender characters
- List of LGBTQ-related films of 1981
- List of Vietnam War films
