= Sweepers (film) =

- Promotional release poster
- Directed by: Keoni Waxman
- Screenplay by: Kevin Bernhardt, Darby Black
- Story by: Kevin Bernhardt
- Produced by: Yoram Barzilai; Danny Lerner; Elie Samaha; David Varod
- Starring: Dolph Lundgren; Claire Stansfield; Bruce Payne
- Cinematography: Yossy Wein
- Edited by: Alain Jakubowicz
- Music by: Serge Colbert
- Release date: 1998
- Running time: 96 minutes
- Countries: South Africa; United States
- Language: English

Sweepers is a 1998 American-South African action film directed by Keoni Waxman and starring Dolph Lundgren, Claire Stansfield and Bruce Payne.

== Plot ==
Christian Erickson (Dolph Lundgren) used to work as a leading demolition expert. As Erickson was working to disarm mines, his son was killed by one, and Erickson retired. He is called out of retirement to help Michelle Flynn (Claire Stansfield) to disarm mine fields in a humanitarian minesweeping operation in Angola. Erickson subsequently discovers that new mines are being planted to kill people in the area.

== Cast ==
- Dolph Lundgren as Christian Erickson
- Claire Stansfield as Michelle Flynn
- Bruce Payne as Dr. Cecil Hopper
- Sheldon Allen as Body Double / Stuntman
- Ian Roberts as Yager
- Fats Bookholane as Old Mo
- Sifiso Maphanga as Arthur
- Ross Preller as Jack Trask
- Nick Boraine as Mitch
- Cecil Carter as Ray Gunn
- David Dukas as Sweeper #4
- Zukile Ggobose as Zukili
- Philip Notununu as Mercenary #1
- Gabriel Mndaweni as Mercenary #2
- Frank Pereira as Mercenary #3
- Dave Ridley as Mercenary #4
- Frikkie Botes as Scientist In Lab
- Jurgen Helberg as Scientist In Lab

== Reception ==
=== Critical response ===
Bryan Kristopowitz stated that Sweepers is a 'terrific action movie' which is 'filled with multiple explosions and copious amounts of gunplay' and is 'one of the star Lundgren’s best of the 1990s'. Another reviewer stated that Sweepers is 'graced with some beautiful location shooting, a great cast, a quality story with political implications and solid direction'. A different reviewer stated that the film is a 'hidden gem in the career of Dolph Lundgren'. In contrast, Mick Martin and Marsha Porter stated that the film was evidence the Lundgren's career had hit 'rock bottom'. A reviewer for Video Store Magazine stated that the film was 'pretty standard fare, with lots of gunfire and dialogue loaded with unintentional laughs'.
