= Angel Tompkins =

American actress and model (born 1942)

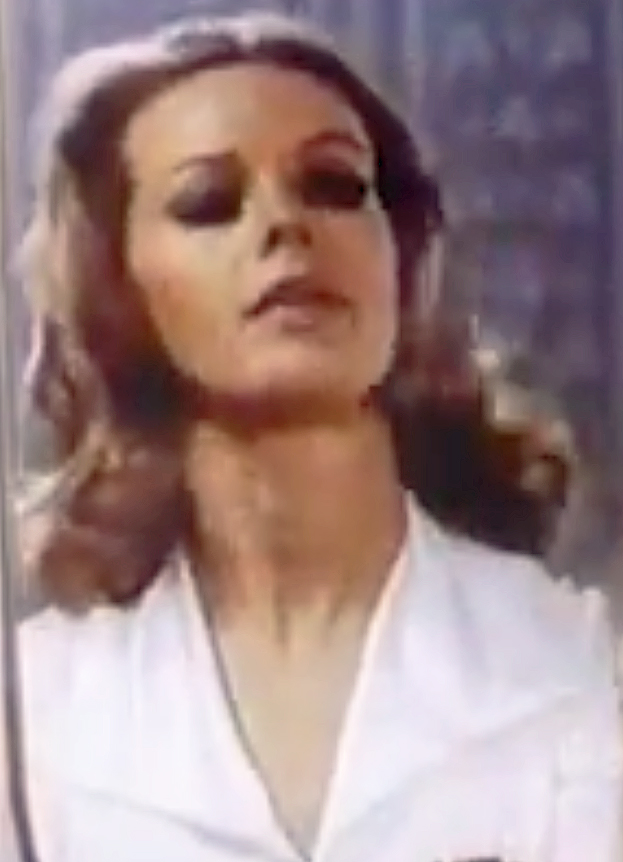
- Tompkins in trailer for I Love My Wife (1970)
- Born: December 20, 1942 (age 83); Albany, California, U.S.
- Occupations: Actress; model
- Years active: 1969–present
- Known for: I Love My Wife; The Teacher
- Spouse: Ted Lang (m. 1985)

Angel Tompkins (born December 20, 1942) is an American actress and model. She appeared in several films and television shows, and is a Golden Globe nominee.

== Career ==
Angel Tompkins's performance in the comedy I Love My Wife (1970), resulted in her being nominated for a Golden Globe award. Tompkins was featured in the pictorial "Angel" in the February 1972 edition of Playboy; subsequently, the magazine used her in three more editions, all presumably related to that film promotion.

She appeared in Prime Cut (1972) with Lee Marvin, Gene Hackman, and Sissy Spacek and Little Cigars (1973) as a gangster's moll who teams up with a gang of little people. She also appeared with Anthony Quinn in The Don Is Dead (1973), with former child star Jay North in The Teacher (1974), and with Bo Svenson in the action sequel Walking Tall Part 2 (1975). Her later films included The One Man Jury (1978), The Bees (1978), Alligator (1980), The Naked Cage (1986), Dangerously Close (1986), and Murphy's Law (1986), opposite Charles Bronson.

In 1987, Tompkins appeared in the comedy film Amazon Women on the Moon and with Ann-Margret in the film A Tiger's Tale, and made her last film appearances in Relentless (1989) and Crack House (1989). She also works in the commercial voice-over field.

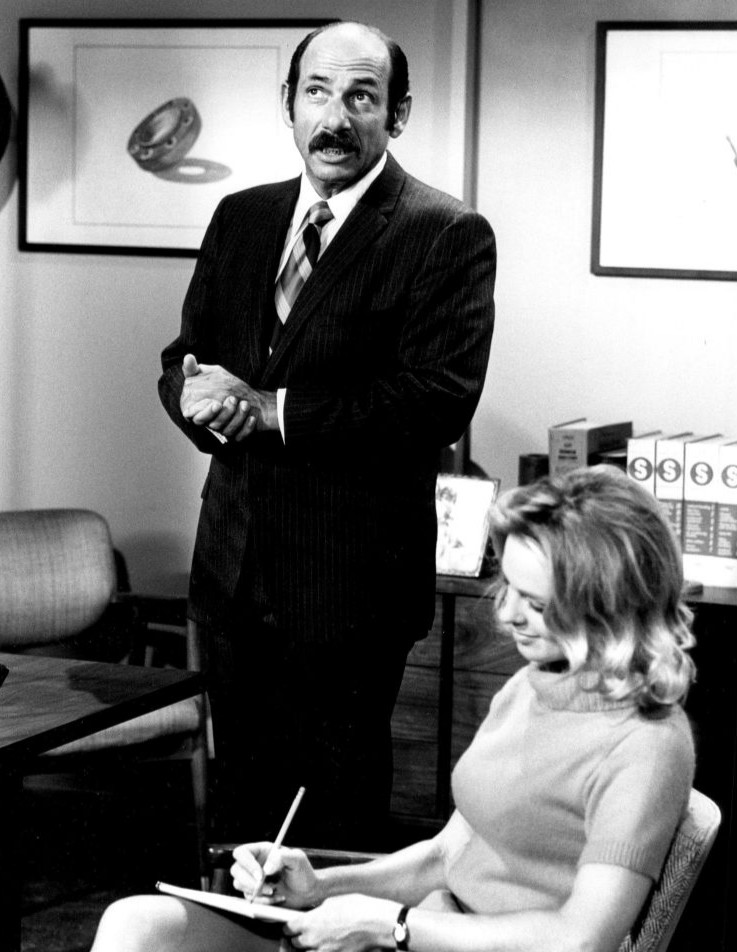
Herschel Bernardi and Angel Tompkins in Arnie in 1970

On television, Tompkins appeared in the pilot for Search (1972). The pilot was originally titled Probe, but the title was changed to Search due to a PBS program already having that title. She also appeared in several of the early episodes of Search. She appeared in many guest spots on shows such as The Wild Wild West (1968), Mannix (1967), Dragnet (1969 episode "Forgery: (DR-33)"), Bonanza (1970), Police Woman (1970), Kojak (1977), The Eddie Capra Mysteries (1978), Three's Company (1978), Knight Rider (1983), and Simon & Simon (1981). Tompkins additionally appeared in the episode "Gallery of Fear" on the Canadian sci-fi program The Starlost.

In 1991, Tompkins was elected the national recording secretary of the Screen Actors Guild (SAG). She ran unsuccessfully for president of the guild in 1995. In 1996, she received the most votes for the SAG Hollywood Board of Directors. She ran for president again in 1999, changing her name to Angeltompkins so her name would appear first on the ballot, and came in third. In 2000, she proposed that members of SAG's partner union, American Federation of Television and Radio Artists, vote to decertify the union and recertify as part of SAG. She came in fourth in the 2001 SAG election, her fifth attempt.

== Personal life ==
She has been married to television and film writer/comedy rewriter, venture capitalist, Ted Lang since 1985. They have two children: Troy and Channing. Their homes are in Los Angeles, San Francisco and Fallbrook, California.

== Filmography ==
=== Film ===
Year	Title	Role	Notes
1969	Hang Your Hat on the Wind	Fran Harper	
1970	I Love My Wife	Helene Donnelly	
1972	Prime Cut	Clarabelle	
1973	Little Cigars	Cleo	
1973	The Don Is Dead	Ruby Dunne	
1974	How to Seduce a Woman	Pamela Balsam	
1974	The Teacher	Diane Marshall	
1975	Walking Tall Part 2	Marganne Stilson	
1977	The Farmer	Betty	
1978	The One Man Jury	Kitty	
1978	The Bees	Sandra Miller	
1980	Alligator	Newswoman	
1986	The Naked Cage	Diane	
1986	Murphy's Law	Jan Murphy	
1986	Dangerously Close	Ms. Waters	
1987	A Tiger's Tale	LaVonne	
1989	Relentless	Carmen	
1989	Crack House	Mother	
2001	Extreme Honor	Gladys	

=== Television ===
Year	Title	Role	Notes
1968	The Wild Wild West	Marcia Dennison	Episode: "The Night of the Death-Maker"
1968	Here Come the Brides	Jenny	Episode: "The Man of the Family"
1969	Dragnet 1967	Sarah Phillips	Episode: "Forgery: DR-33"
1969	Mannix	Barbara Stoner / Sondra Markham	Episode: "A Sleep in the Deep"
1970	Bonanza	Mrs. Janie Lund	Episode: "The Night Virginia City Died"
1970	Arnie	Gabrielle	Episode: "Wife vs. Secretary"
1970	Night Gallery	Lila Bauman	Episode: "Room with a View"
1971	The Name of the Game	Vickie Ward	Episode: "A Sister from Napoli"
1971	The F.B.I.	Polly	Episode: "Death Watch"
1971	O'Hara, U.S. Treasury	Diana	Episode: "Operation: Big Store"
1971	Love, American Style	Joyce	Episode: "Love and the Groupie"
1971–72	Ironside	Kerry / Candy Delmar	Episodes: "Love, Peace, Brotherhood and Murder", "Achilles' Heel"
1972	Probe	Gloria Harding	TV film
1972	Search	Gloria Harding	Episodes: "The Murrow Disappearance", "The Gold Machine"
1973	The Starlost	Daphne	Episode: "Gallery of Fear"
1974	Police Woman	Wanda May Kubelski	Episode: "Anatomy of Two Rapes"
1974	McCloud	Madge	Episode: "The Concrete Jungle Caper"
1975	You Lie So Deep, My Love	Jennifer Pierce	ABC Movie of the Week
1977	Kojak	Jocelyn Mayfair	Episode: "Case Without a File"
1977	Charlie's Angels	Jean Trevor	Episode: "Angels on Horseback"
1978	Three's Company	Grace Thompson	Episode: "The Fast"
1979	CHiPs	Billy Wakefield / Laurie Windsor	Episode: "Destruction Derby"
1983	Knight Rider	Connie Chasen / Nora Rayburn	Episodes: "Nobody Does It Better", "Custom K.I.T.T."
1985	Knots Landing	Maggie	Episode: "#14 with a Bullet"
1985	E/R	Bitsy Carmichael	Episode: "Merry Wives of Sheinfeld: Part 2"
1985	Simon & Simon	Sylvia Finnegan / Bonnie Henderson	Episodes: "Enter the Jaguar", "Down-Home Country Blues"
1985	General Hospital	Dr. Erna Morris	TV series
1986	T. J. Hooker	Diane	Episode: "Death Trap"
1987	The Hitchhiker	Janet O'Mell	Episode: "Homebodies"
1987	Amazing Stories	Mia	Episode: "Stardust"
1990	Growing Pains	Natalie	Episode: "Daddy Mike"
2023	Periphery	Leanne Cross	TV movie (pre-production)

=== Awards and nominations ===
Awards
Year	Award	Category	Production	Result
1971	28th Golden Globe Awards	Most Promising Newcomer - Female	I Love My Wife	Nominated
