= Claire Stansfield =

British-Canadian actress, director, fashion designer and model

- Born: 27 August 1964 (age 62); London, England, U.K.
- Citizenship: United Kingdom; Canada
- Education: Royal Central School of Speech and Drama
- Occupations: Film/television actress, Director, Fashion Designer, Model
- Years active: 1986–2004

Claire Stansfield (born 27 August 1964) is a British-Canadian actress, director, fashion designer, and former model who is best known for her recurring role as Alti in several episodes of the television series Xena: Warrior Princess and guest-starring roles on Cybill, Frasier, and The X-Files.

== Life and career ==
Stansfield was born in London, England to an English father and German mother. She was brought up for most of her youth in Toronto, Ontario, Canada. As a teen she worked as a model in Canada and the UK before turning to acting. She studied at the Central School of Speech and Drama in London before moving to Hollywood. In the early 1980s, she dated and was engaged to Simon Le Bon of Duran Duran.

Besides her role as Alti in Xena: Warrior Princess, Stansfield's other roles include Sid in two episodes of the cult TV series Twin Peaks, one episode of Frasier as Kristina, and the eponymous "The Jersey Devil" in an episode of The X-Files. She also appeared in one episode of the 1990s TV series The Flash as the humanoid android A.L.P.H.A. and guest-starred in an episode of Cybill. In 1998, she starred opposite Dolph Lundgren in the Angolan set film, Sweepers. The film was shot and partly produced in South Africa. She co-starred as one of the antagonists in the 1994 action thriller film Drop Zone with Wesley Snipes.

Stansfield directed The Lovely Leave in 1999, based on the short story of the same name by Dorothy Parker.

Stansfield founded C&C California, a clothing line specialising in 1970s-style T-shirts, in partnership with Cheyann Benedict in 2002. C&C was acquired by Liz Claiborne in 2005.

== Filmography ==
=== Film ===
Year	Title	Role	Notes
1987	Oklahoma Smugglers	Girlfriend	
1991	The Doors	Warhol Eurosnob	
1992	Nervous Ticks	Lu	
1992	The Swordsman	Julie	
1993	Best of the Best II	Greta Brakus	
1994	Bullet for Breakfast	Alegra	
1994	The Favor	Miranda	
1994	Sensation	Paula	
1994	Drop Zone	Kara Sellar	
1995	Gladiator Cop	Julie	
1995	Mind Ripper	Joanne	
1997	Steel	Duvray	
1997	Darkdrive	R.J. Tilda	
1998	Sweepers	Michelle Flynn	

=== Television ===
Year	Title	Role	Notes
1986	Hot Shots	Kristine	Episode: "Accidental Victims"
1990	Twin Peaks	Sid	Episodes: "2.4", "2.5"
1991	The Flash	Alpha	Episode: "Alpha"
1992	Sibs	Anissa	Episode: "The Eleanor Roosevelt Story"
1992	Red Shoe Diaries	Evan	Episode: "The Bounty Hunter"
1993	Raven	Marta Kelsy	Episode "Checkmate"
1993	Route 66	Unknown	Episode: "Everybody's a Hero"
1993	The X-Files	Jersey Devil	Episode: "The Jersey Devil"
1994	Good Advice	Meg	Episode: "I'm Not Ready for My Closeup, Dr. DeRuzza"
1994–2001	Frasier	Kristina Harper	Episodes: "Can't Buy Me Love", "Don Juan in Hell: Part 2"
1995	Platypus Man	Rachel Schulman	Episode: "Lower East Side Story"
1995	Ned and Stacey	Jordan	Episode: "Accountus Interruptus"
1996	Cybill	Dolores	Episode: "Where's Zoey?"
1998	Two of a Kind	Tarah James	Episode: "Model Behavior"
1998–2001	Xena: Warrior Princess	Alti	Recurring role (season 4–6)
