= White Crane Kung Fu =

White Crane Kung-Fu may refer to:

- Fujian White Crane, a southern Chinese martial art
- Tibetan White Crane, a western/southern Chinese martial art
- Crane kick
