= Limalama =

Martial art

- Focus: Polynesian
- Country of origin: Samoa
- Creator: Tu’umamao Tino Tuiolosega
- Official website: http://www.limalama.net/
- Meaning: Hand of Wisdom

Limalama is a Polynesian art of self-defense, created and founded by Tu’umamao "Tino" Tuiolosega (1931–2011). Tuiolosega created the word "Limalama" as a portmanteau derived from the Samoan language words lima (hand) and malamalama (understanding). Tuiolosega defined Limalama to mean "knowledge and understanding", and translated it as "hand of wisdom".

== History ==
As a youth Tuiolosega was taught Polynesian dance movements and techniques which he learned from his father and uncle but these movements were simplistic and some involved movements with striking techniques, based on traditional Samoan dance In the mid-1950s he developed his own techniques and fighting forms to create a new martial arts system which he called "Limalama". He introduced it in Hawaii and later established commercial schools in California. He is recognized worldwide as the Founder of Limalama and Grandmaster of this system.

== Techniques ==
Limalama is system of self-defense which consists of circular motions and movements with a specific curriculum of techniques and forms. It is characterized by flowing, dance-like movements. Around 60% of its curriculum is based on hand techniques. It also uses holds and takedowns, knife and stick fighting, and kicking.

Limalama classifies techniques into thirteen categories:

1. Afikau, dance traditions
2. Amofoe, balance and weight manipulation
3. Fa’aelise, physical movement and co-ordination
4. Fa’ako’elau, wrestling
5. Faufusu, hand strikes
6. Lua’aga, pressure points
7. Milosia, circular movements
8. Pepelu ma Pega, knife work
9. Uma Ma Kaupi’I, holds and takedowns
10. Vaeka ma Kavae, kicks
11. Ti’apega ma Lo’u, stick techniques
12. Tal’amoa, combinations
13. Upaga ma Lo’ulo’uga, traps and locks

== Founder ==
Founder Tu'umamao "Tino" Tuiolosega was a member of the Samoan Royal Family, the son of the King of Ofu-Olosega. He studied Hapkido, Shaolin kung fu, judo, boxing, Hung Ga and other martial arts in his youth, and was trained in traditional Polynesian combat by his father and uncle. He was an amateur boxer and fought in more than 100 matches. He served in the US military during the 1950s, participating in the Battle of Inchon and serving as a hand-to-hand combat instructor, and also acted in the 1979 action film Seven, directed by Andy Sidaris.
