= W.A.K.O. World Championships 1993 =

W.A.K.O. World Championships 1993 may refer to:

- W.A.K.O. World Championships 1993 (Atlantic City)
- W.A.K.O. World Championships 1993 (Budapest)
