= W.A.K.O. World Championships 1983 =

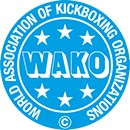
- The poster for W.A.K.O. World Championships 1983
- Promotion: W.A.K.O.
- Date: 22 October 1983
- Venue: Wembley Centre
- City: (United Kingdom) London, England, UK

Event chronology
W.A.K.O. European Championships 1982	W.A.K.O. World Championships 1983	W.A.K.O. European Championships 1984

W.A.K.O. World Championships 1983 were the fourth world kickboxing championships hosted by W.A.K.O. and were organized by British P.K.A. principal Mike Haig. It was the second W.A.K.O. event to be held in London (the 1980 European championship was also held here) and was open to amateur male kickboxers only and featured two forms of kickboxing - Full-Contact and Semi-Contact. By the end of the championships West Germany was the top nation in terms of medals, with US a close second and hosts Great Britain just behind in third. The event was held at the Wembley Centre in London, England, UK on Saturday, 22 October 1983.

== Men's Full-Contact Kickboxing ==
Full-Contact made a return to the world championships, having missed out at the last event in Milan, with more weight classes than ever before (nine), ranging from 57 kg/125.4 lbs to over 91 kg/+200.2 lbs, with all bouts fought under Full-Contact rules. More detail on Full-Contact's rules-set can be found at the W.A.K.O. website, although be aware that the rules have changed since 1983. Many of the weight classes were newly introduced with the 60, 63.5, 67, 71, 75, 80, 91 and over 91 kg divisions replacing the 63, 69, 74, 79, 84 and over 84 kg divisions used at the 1979 world championships. The most notable winner was Ferdinand Mack who won his fourth gold medal at a W.A.K.O. championships. By the end of the championships, West Germany was the strongest nation in Full-Contact, winning three golds and three silvers.

=== Men's Full-contact Kickboxing medals table ===
Event	Gold	Silver	Bronze
-57 kg	João Vieira (Netherlands)	Jan Andresen (Norway)	Creawe (Republic of Ireland); Glover (United Kingdom)
-60 kg	Romeo Charry (Netherlands)	Michael Kuhr (West Germany)	Feene (United Kingdom); Robert Schöberl (Austria)
-63.5 kg	Giorgio Perreca (Italy)	Saša Stojanović (Socialist Federal Republic of Yugoslavia)	Godfrey Butler (United Kingdom); Bensalah (France)
-67 kg	Heinz Klupp (Germany)	Elling Nygård (Norway)	Roberts (Republic of Ireland); Carlos Ramjanali (Portugal)
-71 kg	Ferdinand Mack (Germany)	Ferrari (Italy)	Wolfgang Muller (Austria); Gomez (United States)
-75 kg	Dev Barrett (United Kingdom)	Alexander Zoetl (West Germany)	Mathews (Republic of Ireland); Milakovinč (Socialist Federal Republic of Yugoslavia)
-80 kg	Neidhard Heiderhoff (West Germany)	Klause (Switzerland)	Maurizio Callegari (Italy); Otmar Felsberger (Austria)
-91 kg	Martin Rotzer (West Germany)	Brandenburger (France)	Steve Taberner (United Kingdom); Door (Austria)
+91 kg	Bruno Ciarrochi (France)	Manfred Vogt (West Germany)	Bernardo Cipollaro (Italy); Prinster (Austria)

== Men's Semi-Contact Kickboxing ==
Semi-Contact differed from Full-Contact in that fights were won by using skill, speed and technique to score points rather than by excessive force - more detail on Semi-Contact rules can be found at the official W.A.K.O. website, although be aware that the rules will have changed since 1983. At London there were seven weight divisions in Semi-Contact (two less than Full-Contact) ranging from 57 kg/125.4 lbs to over 84 kg/+184.8 lbs. By the end of the championships the US was easily the strongest nation in Semi-Contact, picking up four gold, two silver and two bronze medals.

=== Men's Semi-Contact Kickboxing medals table ===
Event	Gold	Silver	Bronze
-57 kg	Giuliano Sartoni (Italy)	Rainer Knell (West Germany)	Charlie Lee (United States); Stack (Republic of Ireland)
-63 kg	Tommy Williams (United States)	Brooms (United Kingdom)	Luciano Losi (Italy); Lenherr (Switzerland)
-69 kg	John Chung (United States)	Davis (United Kingdom)	Massimo Casula (Italy); Mark Aston (United Kingdom)
-74 kg	John Lonstreet (United States)	Wilson (United Kingdom)	Gillot (France); Maller (West Germany)
-79 kg	Ludger Dietze (West Germany)	Ray McCallum (United States)	Federico Milani (Italy); Vettel (Switzerland)
-84 kg	Alfie Lewis (United Kingdom)	Donato Milani (Italy)	Rudy Smedley (United States); Grey (Republic of Ireland)
+84 kg	Steve Anderson (United States)	Giorgio Colombo (Italy)	Neville Wray (United Kingdom); Malinaishe (Wales)

== Overall medals standing (top 5) ==
Ranking	Country	Gold (gold)	Silver (silver)	Bronze (bronze)
1	West Germany	4	3	1
2	(United States) US	4	2	2
3	(United Kingdom) Great Britain	3	3	6
4	Italy	2	3	4
5	Netherlands	2	0	0

== See also ==
- List of WAKO Amateur World Championships
- List of WAKO Amateur European Championships
