= Troy Dorsey =

American former boxer and kickboxer

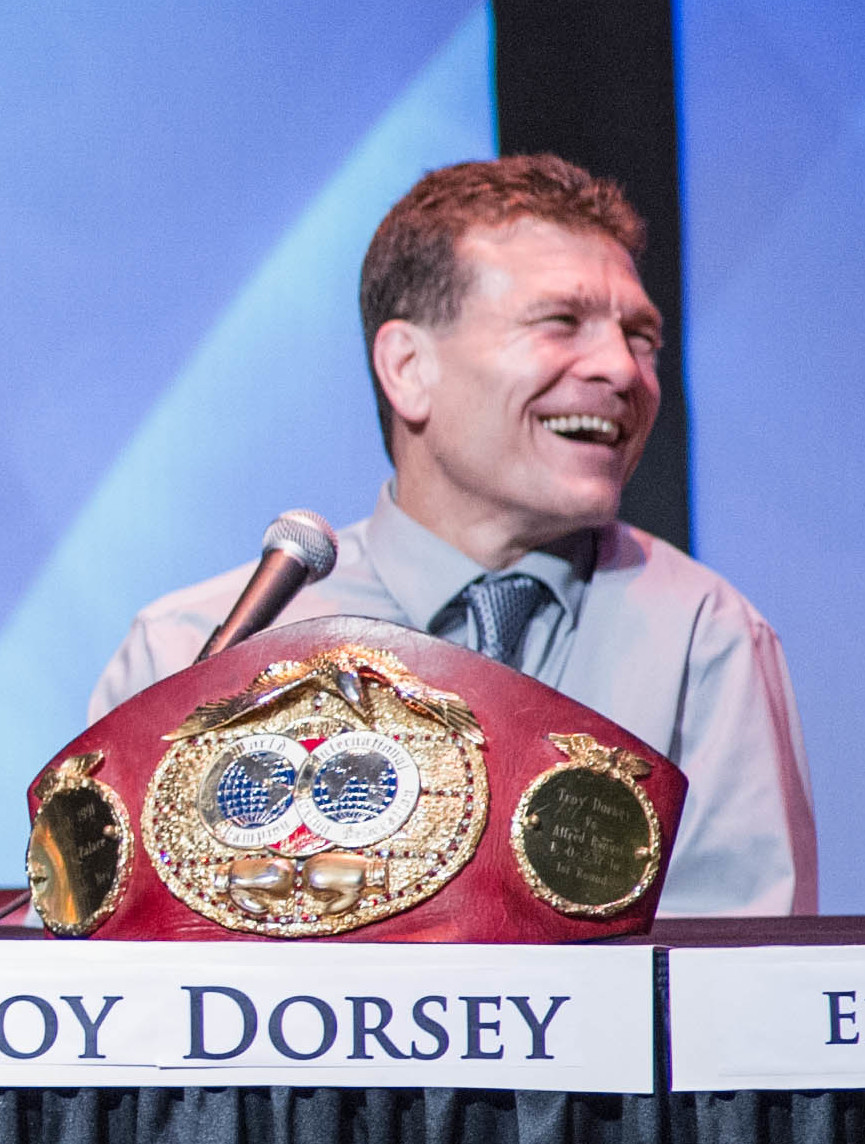
- Dorsey at Texas A&M University-Commerce campus, 2014
- Born: Troy Glenn Dorsey; November 19, 1962 (age 63); Mansfield, Texas, U.S.
- Other names: The Destroyer
- Height: 5 ft 6 in (168 cm)
- Weight: 58.9 kg (130 lb; 9.28 st)
- Division: Bantamweight; Featherweight; Super featherweight Lightweight
- Reach: 66 in (170 cm)
- Style: Boxing, Karate, Kickboxing, Taekwondo
- Stance: Orthodox
- Fighting out of: Fort Worth, Texas
- Team: Troy Dorsey's Karate
- Trainer: Casey Malone
- Rank: 10th degree black belt in Karate; Black belt in Taekwondo
- Years active: 1980-1998

Professional boxing record
- Total: 30
- Wins: 15
- By knockout: 11
- Losses: 11
- By knockout: 5
- Draws: 4

Kickboxing record
- Total: 35
- Wins: 33
- By knockout: 24
- Losses: 2
- By knockout: 0
- Draws: 0

Troy Glenn Dorsey (born November 19, 1962) is a former U.S. boxer and kickboxer who competed in the bantamweight, featherweight and lightweight divisions. Known predominantly for his physical endurance and power, Dorsey began his martial arts training in karate and taekwondo at the age of ten before later making the switch to full contact kickboxing. He was a three-time kickboxing world champion as well as a gold medalist of the WAKO Amateur World Championships in both 1985 (London) and 1987 (Munich). He then began dedicating himself to boxing in 1989. He won the IBF World Featherweight Championship and IBO World Super Featherweight Championship before retiring in 1998.

== Early life ==
Born and raised in Mansfield, Texas, Troy Dorsey began training in karate and taekwondo at the age of ten, eventually reaching the rank of eighth degree black belt. Troy Dorsey was coached in taekwondo by Jim Choate. After competing in point karate competitions, he made the switch to kickboxing, fighting under full contact rules. Troy Dorsey was then coached in boxing and kickboxing by Casey Malone.

== Career ==
After a brief and successful run as an amateur kickboxer in 1980, Dorsey soon turned professional. He rose to prominence with a one-sided knockout defeat of Santae Wilson for the KICK United States Featherweight Championship and defence against Jorge Angat in 1983. At the W.A.K.O. World Championships 1985 (London), held in London, England on November 2, 1985, Dorsey won gold in both semi-contact and full-contact kickboxing in the 57 kg/125 lb division.

His first loss was a split decision against dominant long-time PKA Bantamweight Champion, Felipe Garcia in Garcia's hometown of Denver, Colorado in January 1987. They rematched six months later on August 8, 1987, in El Paso, Texas for the ISKA World Bantamweight ( 54.5 kg/120.2 lb) Full Contact Championship and Dorsey won with a unanimous decision that ended Garcia's eight-year reign. Dorsey defended his ISKA bantamweight world title with knockouts over Steve Demencuk and Jeff Watt. In his victory over Demecuk, Dorsey dropped Demencuk six times before finally knocking his opponent out in the seventh round. At the W.A.K.O. World Championships 1987 in Munich, West Germany in October 1987, Dorsey again took gold in full-contact kickboxing. However, he lost out to Oliver Drexler in the final, earning a silver medal.

On March 18, 1989, Dorsey went up to 60 kg/132 lb to fight Michael Kuhr at a USA vs. Germany event at the Deutschlandhalle in West Berlin, losing a controversial decision after a five-round fight. The following month, Dorsey was scheduled to fight for the Professional Kickboxing Organization (PKO) World Bantamweight (57 kg/125 lb) Championship in Gothenburg, Sweden against Dennis Sigo. However, Sigo had broken his hand during sparring just one week prior to the event, and Michael Kuhr was asked to move down in weight and take the fight. Dorsey won by unanimous decision to take his second world title on April 13, 1989.

Having turned professional as a boxer back in 1985, Dorsey won his first title on August 10, 1989, when he beat Harold Rhodes by technical knockout in the NABF North American Featherweight (57.1 kg/126 lb) Championship. He then challenged Jorge Páez for the IBF World Featherweight ( 57.1 kg/126 lb) Championship in Las Vegas, Nevada on February 4, 1990, losing a controversial split decision. In the fight with Páez, Dorsey set the Guinness World Record for most punches landed in a world championship boxing match with 620.

After a TKO of Bernardo Piñango two months later, Dorsey rematched Páez for both the IBF and WBO World Featherweight titles on July 8, 1990. The bout was scored a split draw. Dorsey later won the IBF featherweight title by knocking out Alfred Rangel in round one for the vacant championship on June 3, 1991. He lost it to Manuel Medina two months later.

Dorsey made a brief return to kickboxing in 1994, knocking out Mechell Rochette in San Jose, California to be crowned the ISKA World Lightweight (60 kg/132.3 lb) Full Contact Champion.

He would return to boxing, and win a lightly regarded title on October 18, 1996, when he forced Jimmi Bredahl to quit on his stool in Vejle, Denmark, taking the IBO World Super Featherweight ( 58.9 kg/130 lb) Championship. Several of his later fights having been stopped due to cuts, Dorsey's retirement from the ring was hastened in 1998.

Troy Dorsey is the only man to hold world titles in both boxing and kickboxing at the same time.

== Personal life ==
He has two daughters, Kendra and Shelly, with his wife Leslie.

== Championships and awards ==
=== Boxing ===
- International Boxing Federation
  - IBF World Featherweight ( 57.1 kg/126 lb) Championship
- International Boxing Organization
  - IBO World Super Featherweight ( 58.9 kg/130 lb) Championship
- North American Boxing Federation
  - NABF North American Featherweight ( 57.1 kg/126 lb) Championship

=== Kickboxing ===
- International Sport Karate Association
  - ISKA World Bantamweight ( 54.5 kg/120.2 lb) Full Contact Championship
  - ISKA World Super Lightweight (63.5 kg/139 lb) Full Contact Championship
- Karate International Council of Kickboxing
  - KICK United States Featherweight Championship
- Professional Kickboxing Organization
  - PKO World Bantamweight ( 57 kg/125 lb) Championship in Gothenburg, Sweden
- WAKO Amateur World Championships
  - W.A.K.O. World Championships 1985 (London) - 57 kg/125 lb Semi Contact Kickboxing Gold Medalist (gold)
  - W.A.K.O. World Championships 1985 (London) - 57 kg/125 lb Full Contact Kickboxing Gold Medalist (gold)
  - W.A.K.O. World Championships 1987- 57 kg/125 lb Semi Contact Kickboxing Silver Medalist (silver)
  - W.A.K.O. World Championships 1987 - 57 kg/125 lb Full Contact Kickboxing Gold Medalist (gold)

== Professional boxing record ==
30 fights	15 wins	11 losses
By knockout	11	5
By decision	4	6
Draws	4	

No.	Result	Record	Opponent	Type	Round, time	Date	Location	Notes
30	Loss	15–11–4	Gabriel Ruelas	TKO	6 (12), 1:25	Jul 11, 1998	Alamodome, San Antonio, Texas, US	For IBA intercontinental lightweight title
29	Loss	15–10–4	Jesús Chávez	RTD	7 (12), 3:00	Oct 4, 1997	Caesars Hotel & Casino, Atlantic City, New Jersey, US	For NABF super featherweight title
28	Win	15–9–4	Rudy Zavala	UD	10	Apr 19, 1997	Celebrity Theater, Phoenix, Arizona, US	
27	Win	14–9–4	Jimmi Bredahl	RTD	7 (12)	Oct 18, 1996	Idraettens hus, Vejle, Denmark	Won IBO super featherweight title
26	Win	13–9–4	Hector Vicencio	UD	10	Apr 12, 1996	Dallas, Texas, US	
25	Loss	12–9–4	Eddie Hopson	UD	12	Oct 27, 1994	Washington Hilton & Towers, Washington, DC, US	For NABF super featherweight title
24	Loss	12–8–4	Oscar De La Hoya	RTD	1 (10), 3:00	Jun 7, 1993	Thomas & Mack Center, Las Vegas, Nevada, US	
23	Loss	12–7–4	Calvin Grove	UD	10	Feb 21, 1993	Blue Horizon, Philadelphia, Pennsylvania, US	
22	Loss	12–6–4	Jesse James Leija	RTD	5 (10), 3:00	Oct 3, 1992	HemisFair Arena, San Antonio, Texas, US	
21	Win	12–5–4	Juan Valenzuela	TKO	4 (10), 2:30	May 2, 1992	Tarrant Co Convention Center, Fort Worth, Texas, US	
20	Loss	11–5–4	Kevin Kelley	UD	12	Feb 18, 1992	Paramount Theatre, New York City, New York, US	For WBC Continental Americas featherweight title
19	Loss	11–4–4	Manuel Medina	UD	12	Aug 12, 1991	Great Western Forum, Inglewood, California, US	Lost IBF featherweight title
18	Win	11–3–4	Alfred Rangel	KO	1 (12), 2:37	Jun 3, 1991	Caesars Palace, Las Vegas, Nevada, US	Won vacant IBF featherweight title
17	Draw	10–3–4	Tom Johnson	MD	12	Nov 18, 1990	Convention Center, Fort Worth, Texas, US	For NABF featherweight title
16	Draw	10–3–3	Jorge Páez	SD	12	Jul 8, 1990	Hilton Hotel, Las Vegas, Nevada, US	For IBF and WBO featherweight title
15	Win	10–3–2	Bernardo Piñango	TKO	8 (10), 0:34	Apr 7, 1990	Hilton Hotel, Las Vegas, Nevada, US	
14	Loss	9–3–2	Jorge Páez	SD	12	Feb 4, 1990	Las Vegas Hilton, Las Vegas, Nevada, US	For IBF featherweight title
13	Win	9–2–2	Harold Rhodes	TKO	10 (12), 2:46	Aug 10, 1989	Four Seasons Arena, Great Falls, Montana, US	Won NABF featherweight title
12	Win	8–2–2	Anthony Boyle	TKO	10 (10), 2:53	Feb 5, 1989	Trump Castle, Atlantic City, New Jersey, US	
11	Draw	7–2–2	Rogelio Lopez	PTS	10	Sep 17, 1988	Dallas Convention Center, Dallas, Texas, US	
10	Win	7–2–1	Alberto Santana	KO	1 (?)	Aug 12, 1988	Pasadena, Texas, US	
9	Win	6–2–1	Fernando Ramos	KO	3 (8)	Jun 10, 1988	Tarrant Co Convention Center, Fort Worth, Texas, US	
8	Win	5–2–1	Delfino Perez	KO	7 (8)	May 1, 1988	Garden City Ballroom, Dallas, Texas, US	
7	Win	4–2–1	David Moreno	UD	8	Jan 19, 1988	Cowtown Coliseum, Fort Worth, Texas, US	
6	Win	3–2–1	Eduardo Rodriguez	KO	1 (6)	Oct 27, 1987	Gorman's Super Pro Gym, Fort Worth, Texas, US	
5	Loss	2–2–1	Tom Johnson	SD	8	Sep 29, 1987	Premier Center, Sterling Heights, Michigan, US	
4	Draw	2–1–1	Darrell Hayes	PTS	4	Apr 9, 1987	Houston, Texas, US	
3	Win	2–1	Conrad Sanchez	MD	6	Mar 6, 1987	Will Rogers Coliseum, Fort Worth, Texas, US	
2	Loss	1–1	Scott Phillips	TKO	1 (6)	Dec 9, 1986	Gorman's Super Pro Gym, Fort Worth, Texas, US	
1	Win	1–0	Rafael Rodriguez	TKO	2 (4), 2:15	Apr 2, 1985	Gorman's Super Pro Gym, Fort Worth, Texas, US	

== Kickboxing record ==
Kickboxing record
33 wins (24 KOs), 2 losses, 0 draws
Date	Result	Opponent	Event	Location	Method	Round	Time
1994-04-15	Win	(Canada) Michel Rochette	Battle of the Masters	San Jose, California, USA	Decision (unanimous)		
Wins the ISKA World Super Lightweight (-63.5 kg/139 lb) Full Contact Championship.
1993-	Loss	(France) Khalid Rahilou			Decision (Unanimous)	12	2:00
For the WKA Full contact World Light welterweight Championship.
1992-00-00	Win	(Ukraine) Alexi Nachaev			KO	5	
Retains the PKO World Bantamweight (-57 kg/125 lb) Championship.
1989-04-13	Win	(West Germany) Michael Kuhr		Gothenburg, Sweden	Decision (unanimous)	10	2:00
Wins the PKO World Bantamweight (-57 kg/125 lb) Championship.
1989-03-18	Loss	(West Germany) Michael Kuhr	USA vs. Germany	West Berlin	Decision	5	2:00
1988-00-00	Win	(United Kingdom) Jeff Watts		United States	KO	3	
Retains the ISKA World Bantamweight (-54.5 kg/120.2 lb) Full Contact Championship.
1987-00-00	Win	(United States) Steve Demencuk		United States	KO	7	
Retains the ISKA World Bantamweight (-54.5 kg/120.2 lb) Full Contact Championship.
1987-08-08	Win	(Mexico) Felipe Garcia		El Paso, Texas, USA	Decision	12	2:00
Wins the ISKA World Bantamweight (-54.5 kg/120.2 lb) Full Contact Championship.
1987-01-00	Loss	(Mexico) Felipe Garcia		Denver, Colorado, USA	Decision (split)		
	Win	(United States) Jorge Angat		United States			
Retains the KICK United States Featherweight Championship.
1983	Win	(United States) Santae Wilson		United States	KO		
Wins the KICK United States Featherweight Championship.
1983	Win	(United States) Alexander Hernandez		United States	Decision		
1982	Win	(United States) Dan Clay		United States	Decision		
1982	Win	(United States) Alexander Hernandez		United States	Decision		
Legend: Win Loss Draw/No contest Notes

== See also ==
- List of featherweight boxing champions

Sporting positions
Major world boxing titles
Vacant Title last held by Jorge Páez	IBF featherweight champion June 3, 1991 - August 12, 1991	Succeeded by Manuel Medina
Minor world boxing titles
Vacant Title last held by Israel Cardona	IBO super featherweight champion October 18, 1996 - 1996; Vacates	Vacant Title next held by Charles Shepherd
