= Tony Young =

Tony Young may refer to:

- Tony Young (director) (1917–1966), British film director and television producer
- Tony Young (politician) (born 1966), San Diego city councillor
- Tony Young (actor) (1937–2002), American film and TV actor
- Tony Young (footballer) (1952–2024), English footballer
- Tony Young (martial artist) (born 1962), African American martial artist
- Anthony M. Young (born 1943), Australian mycologist
- Tony Young (born 1961), Canadian television and radio personality, known as Master T

== See also ==
- Anthony Young (disambiguation)
