= W.A.K.O. World Championships 1985 (London) =

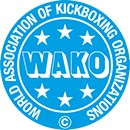
- The poster for W.A.K.O. World Championships 1985 (London)
- Promotion: W.A.K.O.
- Date: November 2, 1985
- Venue: Wembley Centre
- City: (United Kingdom) London, England, UK

Event chronology
W.A.K.O. European Championships 1984	W.A.K.O. World Championships 1985 (London)	W.A.K.O. World Championships Budapest 1985

W.A.K.O. World Championships 1985 London were the joint fifth world kickboxing championships hosted by the W.A.K.O. organization arranged by British karate master Joe Johal – who had been made W.A.K.O. president earlier that year. The organization was facing some turmoil at the time with it splitting into two separate factions due to political differences which meant there were two separate world championships being held – with an event in Budapest that very same weekend. These political differences would, however, be resolved the following year and the organization would come back together. It was the second world championships to be held in the city of London and third overall (the Europeans had been held in 1980, the worlds in 1983).

The event was open to amateur men, and for the first time ever, women were allowed to compete (as they would in Budapest event also). The men had three categories, Full-Contact, Semi-Contact and the newly introduced Musical Forms (which had been unofficially part of the W.A.K.O. World Championships 1981). In contrast, the women had just the one category; Semi-Contact. Each country had one competitor per weight division in men's Full-Contact and Semi-Contact, although some competitors in the men's events competed in two different categories, while the women's Semi-Contact and men's Musical Forms categories were allowed more than one participant per country due to limited numbers. By the end of the championships, the top nation were West Germany, narrowly shading the USA by virtue of an extra silver, with host nation Great Britain behind in third. The event was held at the Wembley Centre in London, England, UK, on Saturday, 2 November 1985.

== Men's Full-Contact Kickboxing ==
In the men's Full-Contact category there were ten weight classes ranging from 54 kg/118.8 lbs to over 91 kg/+200.2 lbs, with the two heaviest divisions being similar to the 1983 world championships and slightly heavier than the last Europeans. All bouts were fought under Full-Contact rules with more detail on the rules being provided at the W.A.K.O. website – although be aware that the rules may have changed slightly since 1985. Notable winners included regular winner Ferdinand Mack who moved up to the 75 kg division to win his sixth gold at a W.A.K.O. championships (world and European) and future boxing world champion Troy Dorsey who would also win gold at the same event in the Semi-Contact category. At the end of the championships West Germany was the comfortable leader in Full-Contact winning an impressive six golds, one silver and one bronze.

=== Men's Full-Contact Kickboxing Medals Table ===
Event	Gold	Silver	Bronze
−54 kg	Gabriel Damm (West Germany)	John Evans (United Kingdom)	No Bronze medallist recorded
−57 kg	Troy Dorsey (United States)	Jurgen Jakob (West Germany)	No Bronze medallist recorded
−60 kg	Michael Kuhr (West Germany)	Gerry Kidd (Republic of Ireland)	No Bronze medallist recorded
−63.5 kg	Tommy Williams (United States)	L. Paerickios (Greece)	No Bronze medallist recorded
−67 kg	Chris McNeesh (United Kingdom)	A. Trimble (Wales)	Leroy Taylor (United States)
−71 kg	Daniel Bodo (West Germany)	Brian Dorsey (United States)	Roland Gut (Switzerland); Pablo Delgado (Mexico)
−75 kg	Ferdinand Mack (West Germany)	Eddie Butcher (United States)	No Bronze medallist recorded
−81 kg	Ray McCallum (United States)	Mario Montrasio (Italy)	Alexander Zoetl (West Germany)
−91 kg	Alois Hoffman (West Germany)	John Graden (United States)	Evaggelos Drosos (Greece)
+91 kg	Martin Roetzer (West Germany)	Jim Graden (United States)	No Bronze medallist

== Semi-Contact Kickboxing ==
Semi-Contact differed from Full-Contact in that fighters were won by points given due to technique, skill and speed, with physical force limited – more information on Semi-Contact can be found on the W.A.K.O. website, although the rules will have changed since 1985. There were also less divisions in men's Semi-Contact with slightly different weight classes ranging from 57 kg/125.4 lbs to over 84 kg/+184.8 lbs. The most notable winner was future boxing world champion Troy Dorsey who also won a gold medal in Full-Contact at the same event. The USA was the top nation in men's Semi-Contact winning four golds and two bronze medals.

Also, for the first time ever women were allowed to compete at a W.A.K.O. championships. The only category on offer was Semi-Contact with just four weight divisions ranging from 50 kg/110 lbs to over 60 kg/132 lbs. Due to the somewhat smaller number of nations competing, some nations were allowed more than one competitor per weight division. By the end of the championships West Germany was the strongest nation in women's Semi-Contact beating off a spirited show by Scotland by winning two golds and one silver medal.

=== Men's Semi-Contact Kickboxing Medals Table ===
Event	Gold	Silver	Bronze
−57 kg	Troy Dorsey (United States)	Harald Roegner (West Germany)	David Gee (Wales)
−63 kg	Rod Sergiew (Scotland)	Walter Lange (West Germany)	Tommy Williams (United States); Desi Murphy (Republic of Ireland)
−69 kg	Walter Reiner (West Germany)	Jackson White (Wales)	John Chung (United States); Ian Ferguson (Scotland)
−74 kg	John Lonstreet (United States)	George McKenzie (United Kingdom)	George Canning (Republic of Ireland); Luzzi (Italy)
−79 kg	John French (United Kingdom)	Robert Jung (West Germany)	Ray McCallum (United States); Baltramy (Italy)
−84 kg	Rudy Smedley (United States)	Alfie Lewis (United Kingdom)	M. Mladen (Socialist Federal Republic of Yugoslavia); Steve Brindley (Wales)
+84 kg	Steve Anderson (United States)	Jeff Singh (India)	Peter Hainke (West Germany); Jaime Cochrale (Wales)

=== Women's Semi-Contact Kickboxing Medals Table ===
Event	Gold	Silver	Bronze
−50 kg	Chris Ganzmann (West Germany)	L. Pavli (United Kingdom)	Hamilton (Republic of Ireland); Hall (Wales)
−55 kg	Gerda Mack (West Germany)	Hilliard (Scotland)	Jean Klink (Scotland)
−60 kg	June Morson (Scotland)	Ute Bernhard (West Germany)	Yvonne Alladice (Wales)
+60 kg	Linda Denley (United States)	D. Kelly (United Kingdom)	Rascall (Wales); Hynes (Scotland)

== Men's Musical Forms ==
Musical Forms made its first official appearance at a W.A.K.O. event (it had been held unofficially in Milan four years previously). Musical Forms is a non-physical competition which sees the contestants fighting against imaginary foes using Martial Arts techniques. Unlike the other categories on offer in London there were no weight classes. More information on Musical Forms can be accessed on the W.A.K.O. website, although be aware that the rules may have changed since 1985. Musical Forms in London was open to men only and by the end of the championships, there was only one recorded winner with the US's John Chung adding a gold to the unofficial one he won in Milan and his second at the London event (he won a bronze in the −69 kg Semi-Contact category as well).

=== Men's Musical Forms Medals Table ===
Event	Gold	Silver	Bronze
Men's Musical Forms	John Chung (United States)	No Silver Medallist	No Bronze Medallist

== Overall Medals Standing (Top 5) ==
Ranking	Country	Gold (gold)	Silver (silver)	Bronze (bronze)
1	West Germany	9	5	2
2	(United States) USA	9	4	3
3	(United Kingdom) Great Britain	2	5	0
4	Scotland	2	1	3
5	Wales	0	1	6

== See also ==
- List of WAKO Amateur World Championships
- List of WAKO Amateur European Championships
