= Armour of God (film) =

1986 Hong Kong film by Jackie Chan and Eric Tsang

- Hong Kong film poster

Chinese name
- Traditional Chinese: 龍兄虎弟
- Simplified Chinese: 龙兄虎弟
Transcriptions
Standard Mandarin
- Hanyu Pinyin: Lóng Xiōng Hǔ Dì
Yue: Cantonese
- Jyutping: Lung4 Hing1 Fu2 Dai6
- Directed by: Jackie Chan; Eric Tsang
- Written by: Jackie Chan; John Sheppard; Eric Tsang
- Produced by: Leonard Ho; Chua Lam
- Starring: Jackie Chan; Alan Tam; Lola Forner; Rosamund Kwan
- Cinematography: Peter Ngor; Robert Thompson; Arthur Wong; Cheung Yiu Cho
- Edited by: Peter Cheung
- Music by: Michael Lai; Tang Siu Lam
- Production companies: Golden Harvest; Goldenway Films Ltd.; Jadran Film; Paragon Films Ltd.
- Distributed by: Golden Harvest; Media Asia (Hong Kong) Roadshow Films (Australia) Miramax Films (United States)
- Release dates: 16 August 1986 (Japan); 21 January 1987 (Hong Kong); 9 June 1988 (Australia); 14 September 1999 (United States)
- Running time: 97 minutes
- Country: Hong Kong
- Language: Cantonese
- Box office: US$16 million (est.)

Armour of God (Chinese: 龍兄虎弟; Jyutping: Lung4 hing1 fu2 dai6 lit. 'Big Brother Dragon, Little Brother Tiger') is a 1986 feature film starring Jackie Chan, Alan Tam, Lola Forner, and Rosamund Kwan.. The film combines Chan's martial arts, comedy and stunts with an Indiana Jones-style adventure theme. It is deemed a cult classic. Chan came the closest he had ever been to death in this film during a relatively routine stunt; he leaped onto a tree from a ledge, but the branch he grabbed snapped, sending Chan plummeting and cracking his skull.

It was the highest-grossing film in Hong Kong at the time, at an estimated US$16,300,000 (equivalent to $48,000,000 in 2025) at the box office in Asia and Europe. It was followed by the sequels Armour of God II: Operation Condor in 1991, and CZ12 in 2012. A fourth film, Armour of God IV: Ultimatum, is expected to be released in 2027.

== Plot ==
Jackie, a.k.a. "Asian Hawk", is a former musician who becomes an adventurer and treasure hunter. After successfully stealing a sword from an African tribe, he has the weapon auctioned before it is won by May Bannon, the beautiful daughter of Count Bannon.

Jackie is reunited with his former bandmate Alan, who seeks his help as his girlfriend Lorelei has been kidnapped by an evil religious cult as a means of acquiring Jackie's services. The cult possesses two pieces of a legendary armour called the "Armour of God", and they intend to have Jackie bring them the three remaining armour pieces, including the sword. Jackie and Alan strike a deal with Count Bannon, who is in possession of the three armour pieces: they will borrow the armour pieces for their quest to rescue Lorelei with a promise to complete the armour for the Count, on the condition that May accompanies them.

Jackie, Alan and May travel into Yugoslavia to find the cult's monastery. They infiltrate the hideout and secretly rescue Lorelei, unaware that the cult leaders have anticipated their arrival and brainwashed her to do their bidding. At May's rest home, Lorelei drugs Alan and has him steal the three armour pieces. Jackie sneaks back to the monastery and rescues his friends. As Alan and Lorelei make their escape, Jackie fends off against the cult members before discovering the Armour of God in a cave. Before he gets a chance to take the armour, he encounters the Grand Wizard, who unleashes his four female assassins on the adventurer. Exploiting their high-heeled shoes as their weakness, Jackie defeats the assassins in a gruelling fight.

Jackie is then surrounded by the rest of the Grand Wizard's men, but he reveals a vest filled with sticks of dynamite under his jacket, threatening to blow himself up with the monastery. After a couple of bluffs, he accidentally lights up all the dynamite fuses. Discarding the explosives, he runs for his life as the detonations cave in the monastery, burying the entire cult and the Armour of God. He runs out of a cave and spots a hot-air balloon with Alan, Lorelei, and May aboard. In a daring move, Jackie does a base jump off the cave and lands on top of the balloon, ending the movie.

== Cast ==
- Jackie Chan as Jackie a.k.a. "Asian Hawk", a common treasure hunter and former member of the pop group "The Losers" (an allusion to 1970s Cantopop band The Wynners)
- Alan Tam as Alan, a former member of The Losers who has moved on to a successful solo career
- Lola Forner as May Bannon, the daughter of a powerful European Count
- Rosamund Kwan as Lorelei, Alan's girlfriend and a former member of the Losers who is a prominent fashion designer
- Božidar Smiljanić as Count Bannon, May's father
- Ken Boyle as Grand Wizard, the leader of the evil religious cult
- John Ladalski as Lama
- Robert O'Brien as the African witch doctor
- Boris Gregoric as Jackie's representative at the auction
- Mars (extra) (uncredited)
- Kenny Bee
- Carina Lau
- Anthony Chan

Cameo :

- Marcia Chisholm
- Linda Denley
- Stephanie Evans
- Alicia Shonte
- Vivian Wickliffe

== Production ==
Armour of God was filmed on location in parts of what was then Yugoslavia: Zagreb (Dolac Central Market), Upper town, Trnje (near the then-unfinished building of Croatian Radio Television), Croatia, narrow corridors and the main gate of Motovun castle and Predjama Castle near Postojna, Slovenia. Filming was also undertaken in Graz, Austria, France, Spain and Morocco. During filming of the opening sequence, one scene called for Jackie Chan to jump from a wall to a tree branch. The first take went as planned, but Chan insisted on re-shooting the scene. On his second attempt, the branch broke, and he fell 5 metres to the ground below. His head hit a rock, cracking his skull and forcing a piece of bone up into his brain. Chan was flown to the hospital and was in surgery eight hours later. As a result, he now has a permanent hole in his head filled with a plastic plug and slight hearing loss in his right ear. Actor Eric Tsang filled in as director following the accident. Footage of the accident is shown during the film's ending credits.

While shooting the hot-air balloon jump, Chan skydived out of a plane and landed on top of the balloon instead of jumping off a cliff as is seen in the film. For the shot of him jumping off the cliff, the crew rigged him up to a wire as he had no experience of BASE jumping.

Cynthia Rothrock was originally auditioned for the role of Amazon Fighter in the film. However, Rothrock turned down the role due to Chan's injury halting production of the film, before Rothrock was re-assigned to play as the lead actress in Yuen Biao's 1986 film Righting Wrongs. Rothrock was replaced by Marcia Chisholm.

== Release ==
Armour of God was released in Japan on 16 August 1986. The film was released in Hong Kong on 21 January 1987.

== Reception ==
=== Box office ===
In Hong Kong, the film grossed HK$35,469,408 (US$4,548,526). It was the highest-grossing film in Hong Kong at the time. In Japan, the film grossed ¥1.36 billion (US$9.4 million). In Taiwan, it grossed NT$13,504,585 (US$472,188). In South Korea, it was the top-grossing foreign film of 1987, with 208,462 ticket sales, equivalent to an estimated ₩729,617,000 (US$886,999).

In Hungary, the film sold 464,200 tickets at the box office in 1988, equivalent to an estimated €510,600 (US$603,785) in gross revenue. In France, it sold 88,231 tickets in 1988, equivalent to an estimated €326,500 (US$386,086). Combined, the film grossed an estimated US$16,300,000 (equivalent to $48,000,000 in 2025) in Asia and Europe.

=== Critical response ===
The film received positive reviews, with an approval rating of 71% on Rotten Tomatoes based on 34 reviews.

In 2014, Time Out polled several film critics, directors, actors and stunt actors to list their top action films. Armour of God was listed at 81st place on this list.

== Versions ==
In Asia, some versions of the film had Alan Tam's song "Lorelei" playing during the end credits, whereas others had Jackie Chan singing "Flight of the Dragon (aka High upon High)". Tam and Chan recorded both songs in Cantonese and English and their English versions were featured in the export English dubs.

In the United States, Armour of God did not receive a theatrical release. The film's sequel, Armour of God II: Operation Condor (1991), was released under the simplified title Operation Condor. Armour of God was subsequently released direct-to-video by Miramax Films, but the title was changed to Operation Condor 2: The Armor of the Gods; at the time of its release it served as a prequel, despite being the first film. A new musical score was created for this release, and a new English dub (with the participation of Chan).

Nine minutes of cuts were made to the Miramax version, including:

- The concert scene of Jackie's band The Losers.
- Jackie's dream sequence.
- The scene in which May, disguised as a prostitute, encounters a monk who wants to sleep with her.
- An extended version of the slapstick sequence in which Alan hides in May's room. The scene also includes a brainwashed Lorelei attempting to seduce Jackie.

These same cuts were evident in the Spanish Region 2 release; however, DVD releases in Hong Kong, Australia and the rest of Europe are uncut.

== Awards and nominations ==
- 1988 Hong Kong Film Awards
  - Nomination: Best Action Choreography (Jackie Chan Stunt Team, Lau Kar-wing, Danny Yuen)

== See also ==
- Jackie Chan filmography
- List of Hong Kong films
- Khiladi 420 (2000), an Indian action film in which Akshay Kumar performs a similar hot-air balloon stunt
