= W.A.K.O. World Championships 1987 =

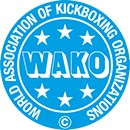
- The poster for W.A.K.O. World Championships 1987
- Promotion: W.A.K.O.
- Date: 10 October (Start); 11 October 1987 (End)
- Venue: Olympiahalle
- City: Munich, West Germany
- Attendance: 11,000

Event chronology
W.A.K.O. European Championships 1986	W.A.K.O. World Championships 1987	W.A.K.O. European Championships 1988

W.A.K.O. World Championships 1987 were the sixth world kickboxing championships hosted by W.A.K.O. and arranged by the German Karate pioneer Georg Brueckner and Carl Wiedmeier. The event was open to amateur men and women, with 290 competitors from 29 countries taking part. The styles on offer were Full-Contact (men only), Semi-Contact and Musical Forms (men only). Typically, each country was allowed one competitor per weight division, although in some instances more than one was allowed. Participants were also allowed to compete in more than one style. By the end of the championships, USA was the top of the medals tables, with hosts West Germany in second and Canada in third. The event was held at the Olympiahalle in Munich, Germany over two days (Saturday 10 October/Sunday 11 October) and were attended by an estimated 11,000 spectators.

== Full-Contact ==
Full-Contact was available to men only at Munich and consisted of the usual ten weight divisions ranging from 54 kg/118.8 lbs to over 91 kg/200.2 lbs. All bouts were fought under Full-Contact kickboxing rules – more detail on the rules can be found at the W.A.K.O. website, although be aware that they may have changed slightly since 1987. Notable winners included future professional world champions Marek Piotrowski (kickboxing) and Troy Dorsey (boxing), Hungarian Olympic wrestling champ Norbert Növényi, and the ever present Ferdinand Mack picking up gold medals. Ferdinand Mack would win his eighth gold medal at a W.A.K.O. championships. By the end of the championships, the USA seemed to have toppled hosts West Germany as the top nation in Full-Contact, with three golds, two silvers and one bronze.

=== Men's Full-Contact Kickboxing Medals Table ===
Event	Gold	Silver	Bronze
-54 kg	Peter Hiereth (West Germany)	Jonny Gevriye (Sweden)	Gabriel Damm (West Germany); F. Haddoliche (France)
-57 kg	Troy Dorsey (United States)	Massimo Spinelli (Italy)	Brahim Rahal (Algeria); Oskar Balogh (Hungary)
-60 kg	Mike Anderson (United States)	Hamed Sakraoui (France)	Bogdan Sawicki (Poland); Farid Agueni (Algeria)
-63 kg	Khalid Rahilou (France)	Tommy Williams (United States)	Clemens Willner (West Germany); Giorgio Perreca (Italy)
-67 kg	Mario Dimitroff (West Germany)	Romeo Charry (Netherlands)	Trevor Ambrose (United Kingdom); Yazid Djahnit (Algeria)
-71 kg	Jose Eguzquiza (Spain)	Slimane Hamzaoui (Algeria)	Norbert Fisch (Switzerland); Carl Whitaker (United States)
-75 kg	Ferdinand Mack (West Germany)	Nasser Nassiri (Iran)	Alby Bimpson (United Kingdom); G. Anastasion (Greece)
-81 kg	Marek Piotrowski (Poland)	Károly Halász (Hungary)	Jonny Andreasson (Sweden); Sokrates Karaites (Greece)
-91 kg	Jerry Rhome (United States)	Helmut Joder (West Germany)	Bruno Campiglia (Italy); Oliver Turcan (Turkey)
+91 kg	Norbert Növényi (Hungary)	Jim Graden (United States)	Oskar Printster (Austria); Klaus Osterrieder (West Germany)

== Semi-Contact ==
Both men and women took part in Semi-Contact competitions in Munich. Semi-Contact differed from Full-Contact in that fights were won by points given due to technique, skill and speed, with physical force limited. At Munich the men had seven weight classes, starting at 57 kg/125.4 lbs and ending at over 84 kg/184.8 lbs, while the women's competition had four weight classes beginning at 50 kg/110 lbs and ending at over 60 kg/132 lbs. There were a few notable winners in the men's events with Mike Anderson winning gold and American teammate and future pro-boxing world champion Troy Dorsey picking up silver (both had won gold in the Full-Contact category at the same games). By the end of the championships, USA were the top nation in Semi-Contact with five golds, one silver and one bronze (male and female combined).

=== Men's Semi-Contact Kickboxing Medals Table ===
Event	Gold	Silver	Bronze
-57 kg	Oliver Drexler (West Germany)	Troy Dorsey (United States)	Maurizio Cuccu (Italy); K. Uzan (Turkey)
-63 kg	Peter Gilpin (Canada)	Giuseppe Trucchi (Italy)	Walter Lange (West Germany); Tommy Williams (United States)
-69 kg	Robert Ulbrich (West Germany)	Evelyn Dwyer (United Kingdom)	Daniel Kroepfl (Austria); Janos Hortobagyi (Hungary)
-74 kg	Jay Bell (United States)	Lajos Hugyetz (Hungary)	Gianni Peluchetti (Switzerland); Juergen Pelikan (West Germany)
-79 kg	Johann Heidinger (Austria)	Raymond Deschamps (Canada)	Federico Milani (Italy); Rudolf Soos (Hungary)
-84 kg	Alfie Lewis (United Kingdom)	Peter Bernd (West Germany)	A. Edoo (Cameroon); Michele Surian (Italy)
+84 kg	Steve Anderson (United States)	Peter Hainke (West Germany)	Barnabas Katona (Hungary); E. Bettancourt (Cape Verde)

=== Women's Semi-Contact Kickboxing Medals Table ===
Event	Gold	Silver	Bronze
-50 kg	Lori Lantrip (United States)	Gerda Mack (West Germany)	Lou Pauli (United Kingdom); Elena Capitanio (Italy)
-55 kg	Angela Schmid (West Germany)	Josee Blanchard (Canada)	K. Leclerc (France); Michelina Giagnotti (Italy)
-60 kg	Helen Chung (United States)	Ute Bernhard (West Germany)	Diane Riley (United Kingdom); Betty Hills (Canada)
+60 kg	Linda Denley (United States)	Veronica Desantos (Canada)	Tiziana Zennaro (Italy); Gabriella Bady (Hungary)

== Musical Forms ==
Musical Forms returned to a W.A.K.O. championships having been absent at the European championships in Athens. The event was for men only but unlike the previous appearances in London and Milan there were now more categories; with hard styles, soft styles and weapons introduced. Musical Forms is a non-physical competition which sees the contestants fighting against imaginary foes using Martial Arts techniques – more information can be accessed on the W.A.K.O. website, although be aware that the rules may have changed since 1987. By the end of the championships, the USA were the top nation in Musical Forms, winning two gold and one silver medal.

=== Men's Musical Forms Medals Table ===
Event	Gold	Silver	Bronze
Hard Styles	Jean Frenette (Canada)	John Chung (United States)	Antonio Caridi (Italy)
Soft Styles	Keith Hirabayashi (United States)	Bui Duc Lai (Vietnam)	Christian Wolff (West Germany)
Weapons	Keith Hirabayashi (United States)	Jean Frenette (Canada)	Nick Stratacos (Saudi Arabia)

== Overall Medals Standing (Top 5) ==
Ranking	Country	Gold (gold)	Silver (silver)	Bronze (bronze)
1	(United States) USA	10	4	2
2	West Germany	6	5	6
3	Canada	2	4	0
4	Hungary	1	2	4
5	France	1	2	0

== See also ==
- List of WAKO Amateur World Championships
- List of WAKO Amateur European Championships
