= W.A.K.O. European Championships 1984 =

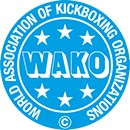
- The poster for W.A.K.O. European Championships 1984
- Promotion: W.A.K.O.
- Date: 22 September 1984
- City: Graz, Austria

Event chronology
W.A.K.O. World Championships 1983	W.A.K.O. European Championships 1984	W.A.K.O. World Championships 1985 London

W.A.K.O. European Championships 1984 were the seventh European kickboxing championships hosted by the W.A.K.O. organization arranged by Peter Land. The championships were open to amateur men based in Europe with each country allowed only one competitor per weight division, with the styles on offer being Full-Contact and Semi-Contact kickboxing. Regular European leaders West Germany were the top nation by the end of the championships, followed by Italy in second and hosts Austria in third. The event was held in Graz, Austria on Saturday, 22 September 1984.

== Men's Full-Contact Kickboxing ==
Full-Contact had been absent at the last European championships, but returned in 1984. There were now ten weight classes ranging from 54 kg/118.8 lbs to over 87 kg/191.4 lbs, with the 54 kg division being newly introduced and the two heaviest divisions being changed slightly from the last world championships. All of the bouts were fought under Full-Contact rules, and more detail can be found on the W.A.K.O. website – although the rules may have changed slightly since 1984. The most notable winner was Ferdinand Mack who won his sixth W.A.K.O. gold medal (Euro and world). By the end of the championships, West Germany once more were the top nation in Europe in Full-Contact winning four gold and two silver medals.

=== Men's Full-Contact Kickboxing Medals Table ===
Event	Gold	Silver	Bronze
-54 kg	Jurgen Jakob (West Germany)	Bogdan Stoijkovic (Austria)	Patrick Cammalleri (Belgium); Livio Carité (Italy)
-57 kg	Kumur Raj (Denmark)	E. Muhlberger (West Germany)	Gerhard Poms (Austria); Vladimir Sitar (Socialist Federal Republic of Yugoslavia)
-60 kg	Gerry Kidd (Republic of Ireland)	Michael Duhs (Austria)	Branco Morellini (Switzerland); Zadravec Certomiz (Socialist Federal Republic of Yugoslavia)
-63.5 kg	Sasha Stojanovich (Socialist Federal Republic of Yugoslavia)	Andreas Richter (West Germany)	Gaetano Scarpetta (Italy); Bruno Ferretti (Belgium)
-67 kg	Massimo Liberati (Italy)	Erich Gsellmann (Austria)	Aco Serafinovski (Denmark)
-71 kg	Ferdinand Mack (West Germany)	Derrick Edwards (United Kingdom)	Wolfgang Muller (Austria); Paolo Liberati (Italy)
-75 kg	Alexander Zotl (West Germany)	Alfonso Sgarro (Italy)	Moreno Gallego (Spain); Gill Kashmir (United Kingdom)
-80 kg	Pino Bosco (Belgium)	Laurence White (United Kingdom)	Maurizio Callegari (Italy); Otmar Felsberger (Austria)
-87 kg	Ernest Ingdorr (Austria)	Stefano Bortoloni (Italy)	Alex Brodmann (Switzerland); Vasilikos Kirarisson (Greece)
+87 kg	Martin Roetzer (West Germany)	Manfred Hammerl (Austria)	Mladen Stanimirovic (Socialist Federal Republic of Yugoslavia); Bruno Campiglia (Italy)

== Men's Semi-Contact Kickboxing ==
Semi-Contact differed from Full-Contact in that fighters were won by points given due to technique, skill and speed, with physical force limited - more information on Semi-Contact can be found on the W.A.K.O. website, although the rules will have changed since 1984. There were fewer weight divisions when compared to Full-Contact with seven ranging from 57 kg/125.4 lbs to over 84 kg/+184.8 lbs. By the championships end the top nation in Semi-Contact were West Germany who won three golds, one silver and three bronze medals.

=== Men's Semi-Contact Kickboxing Medals Table ===
Event	Gold	Silver	Bronze
-57 kg	Gerhard Walde (Italy)	Ozkan Kadir (West Germany)	Peter Muller (Austria); Istvan Fodoz (Hungary)
-63 kg	Walter Lange (West Germany)	Manfred Frohwein (Austria)	G. DePablo Pedro (Spain); Kevin Green (United Kingdom)
-69 kg	Massimo Casula (Italy)	Rudolf Soos (Hungary)	S. Bajraktarevic (Socialist Federal Republic of Yugoslavia); Reiner Walter (West Germany)
-74 kg	Johann Heidinger (Austria)	Leonardo Pavoni (Italy)	Wolfgang Muller (West Germany); Mark Aston (United Kingdom)
-79 kg	Ludger Dietze (West Germany)	Clive Parkinson (United Kingdom)	Dejan Bancic (Socialist Federal Republic of Yugoslavia); Herald Raimond (Switzerland)
-84 kg	Robert Jung (West Germany)	Alvin Mighty (United Kingdom)	Barnabas Katowa (Hungary); Martin Golob (Socialist Federal Republic of Yugoslavia)
+84 kg	Neville Wray (United Kingdom)	Italo Piras (Italy)	Vojislav Car (Socialist Federal Republic of Yugoslavia); Roland Bleich (West Germany)

== Overall Medals Standing (Top 5) ==
Ranking	Country	Gold (gold)	Silver (silver)	Bronze (bronze)
1	West Germany	7	3	3
2	Italy	3	4	4
3	Austria	2	5	4
4	(United Kingdom) Great Britain	1	4	3
5	(Socialist Federal Republic of Yugoslavia) Yugoslavia	1	0	7

== See also ==
- List of WAKO Amateur European Championships
- List of WAKO Amateur World Championships
