= W.A.K.O. European Championships 1990 =

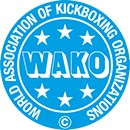
- The poster for W.A.K.O. European Championships 1990
- Promotion: W.A.K.O.
- Date: 16 November (Start); 18 November 1990 (End)
- City: Madrid, Spain

Event chronology
W.A.K.O. World Championships 1990	W.A.K.O. European Championships 1990	W.A.K.O. World Championships 1991

W.A.K.O. European Championships 1990 were the tenth European kickboxing championships hosted by the W.A.K.O. organization and the first ever to be held in Spain. The event was open to amateur men and women from twenty-four countries across Europe, with four styles on offer; Full-Contact (men only), Semi-Contact, Light-Contact and Musical Forms (men only), with women participating in Light-Contact for the first time ever. Each country was allowed one competitor per weight division per category, although fighters could take part in more than one style. By the end of the championships, Great Britain was the top nation in terms of medals won, with West Germany second and Italy third. The event was held over three days in Madrid, Spain, from Friday 16 November to Sunday 18 November, 1990.

== Full-Contact ==
At Madrid Full-Contact was available to men only and was made up of ten weight divisions ranging from 54 kg/118.8 lbs to over 91 kg/+200.2 lbs. All bouts were fought under Full-Contact kickboxing rules - more detail on the rules can be found at the W.A.K.O. website, although be aware that they may have changed slightly since 1990. The most notable winner was future pro boxer Przemysław Saleta who added to the gold medal he had won at the European championships at the beginning of the year by claiming gold in the -91 kg category. By the end of the championships CIS was the top nation in Full-Contact, winning two golds, one silver and two bronze medals.

=== Men's Full-Contact Kickboxing Medals Table ===
Event	Gold	Silver	Bronze
-54 kg	Massimo Spinelli (Italy)	Oskar Balough (Hungary)	Yilmaz Demirkapu (Belgium); Huete (Spain)
-57 kg	Alexeji Nechaev (Commonwealth of Independent States)	Erdogan (Turkey)	Lombardi (Italy); Pina (Portugal)
-60 kg	Ivan Aksutin (Commonwealth of Independent States)	Helge Halvorsen (Norway)	Bogdan Sawicki (Poland); Diaz (Portugal)
-63.5 kg	Pinel (Spain)	Ivanov (Commonwealth of Independent States)	Bruno Chesnot (France); Carvalho (Portugal)
-67 kg	Klemens Willner (West Germany)	Imed Matlouti (France)	Teixeira (Portugal); Hsaine (Belgium)
-71 kg	Gerd Dittrich (West Germany)	Baard Trones (Norway)	Ruggiero (France); Zelevic (Socialist Federal Republic of Yugoslavia)
-75 kg	Fernandez (Portugal)	Riccio (Italy)	Jozef Warchol (Poland); Sharepo (Commonwealth of Independent States)
-81 kg	Sanchez (Spain)	Jorge (Portugal)	Spiridon (Belgium); Pavel Rumas (Poland)
-91 kg	Przemysław Saleta (Poland)	Mutavlic (Socialist Federal Republic of Yugoslavia)	Lopez (Spain); Perreira (Portugal)
+91 kg	Paolo Zorello (Italy)	Bernard Fucho (France)	Hubert Numrich (Germany); Igor Sharapov (Commonwealth of Independent States)

== Semi-Contact ==
Semi-Contact was available to both men and women in Madrid. Semi-Contact differed from Full-Contact in that fights were won by points given due to technique, skill and speed, with physical force limited - more information on Semi-Contact can be found on the W.A.K.O. website, although the rules will have changed since 1990. The men had seven weight classes, starting at 57 kg/125.4 lbs and ending at over 84 kg/+184.8 lbs, while the women's competition had four weight classes beginning at 50 kg/110 lbs and ending at over 60 kg/132 lbs. The most notable winner was Abidin Uz who won his second gold medal at Madrid, having picked up a gold in Light-Contact as well. By the end of the championships Great Britain was by far the most successful nation in Semi-Contact, picking up five gold, two silvers and one bronze in the male and female categories.

=== Men's Semi-Contact Kickboxing Medals Table ===
Event	Gold	Silver	Bronze
-57 kg	Abidin Uz (Turkey)	Oliver Drexler (West Germany)	Piotr Siegoczynski (Poland); Tony Byrne (Republic of Ireland)
-63 kg	Reiner Stadtmuller (West Germany)	Luisa Lico (Italy)	Juan Perez (Portugal); Sosa (Spain)
-69 kg	Billy Bryce (United Kingdom)	M. Niola (Italy)	Walder (Austria); Hortobagy (Hungary)
-74 kg	Stephen Thompson (United Kingdom)	Lajos Hugyetz (Hungary)	Sergio Portaro (Italy); Andreas Lindemann (West Germany)
-79 kg	Peter Edwards (United Kingdom)	Markus Zadra (Italy)	Ralf Kunzler (West Germany); Flanagan (Republic of Ireland)
-84 kg	Peter Bernt (West Germany)	Kevin Brewerton (United Kingdom)	Riboud (France); Zoltán Szűcs (Hungary)
+84 kg	Alfie Lewis (United Kingdom)	Valentini (Italy)	O'Brian (Republic of Ireland); No Medallist Recorded

=== Women's Semi-Contact Kickboxing Medals Table ===
Event	Gold	Silver	Bronze
-50 kg	Karin Schiller (West Germany)	Quansah (United Kingdom)	Szepressi (Hungary); Diego (Spain)
-55 kg	Lajos Hugyetz (Hungary)	Rosaria Rotario (Italy)	Mahner (West Germany); Smith (United Kingdom)
-60 kg	Lahnsen (United Kingdom)	Roberta Vitali (Italy)	Gabriella Bady (Hungary); Van Eetveld (Belgium)
+60 kg	Tiziana Zennaro (Italy)	Moffett (Netherlands)	Mestar (France); Rivilla (Spain)

== Light-Contact ==
Light-Contact in Madrid was available to men and, for the first time ever at a W.A.K.O. championships, to women. Involving more physical contact than Semi but less so than Full, points were awarded on the basis of speed and technique over power. Light-Contact was also seen by some as an intermediate stage for kickboxers who were considering a move from Semi to Full-Contact. More information on Light-Contact can be found on the W.A.K.O. website although be aware that the rules may have changed since 1990. Like Semi-Contact, the men had seven weight classes, starting at 57 kg/125.4 lbs and ending at over 84 kg/+184.8 lbs, while the women had four weight classes beginning at 50 kg/110 lbs and ending at over 60 kg/132 lbs. The most notable winner was Abidin Uz who won his second gold medal at Madrid, having picked up a gold in Semi-Contact as well. By the championships end, Hungary was the most successful nation in Light-Contact, winning three golds and two bronzes.

=== Men's Light-Contact Kickboxing Medals Table ===
Event	Gold	Silver	Bronze
-57 kg	Abidin Uz (Turkey)	Jakob Jurgen (West Germany)	Conrad (United Kingdom); Melo (Portugal)
-63 kg	Rafael Neito (United Kingdom)	Axel Briesenich (West Germany)	Duponchel (France); Silvano Cosentino (Italy)
-69 kg	Claudio Pattarino (Poland)	Marough (France)	Ernison Surkovic (Socialist Federal Republic of Yugoslavia); Dimont (Belgium)
-74 kg	Lajos Hugyetz (Hungary)	Robert Steiner (Switzerland)	Nicolo (Italy); Karpov (Commonwealth of Independent States)
-79 kg	Ray McKenzie (United Kingdom)	Stefano Rigamonti (Italy)	Dunglas (France); Harald Zimmermann (West Germany)
-84 kg	Zoltán Szűcs (Hungary)	Wilkinson (United Kingdom)	Giorgio Colombo (Italy); Deveci (Turkey)
+84 kg	Bruno Campiglia (Italy)	Ray McKenzie (United Kingdom)	Kabba (France); Barnabás Katona (Hungary)

=== Women's Light-Contact Kickboxing Medals Table ===
Event	Gold	Silver	Bronze
-50 kg	Szepessi (Hungary)	Alò (Italy)	Diego (Spain); Keogh (Republic of Ireland)
-55 kg	K. Leclerc (France)	Smith (United Kingdom)	Kirschbaum (West Germany); Anna Maria Milani (Italy)
-60 kg	Sonia Bonazza (Italy)	Rylik (Poland)	Hebert (France); Harris (United Kingdom)
+60 kg	Claudia Schregle (West Germany)	Bailey (United Kingdom)	Byrne (Republic of Ireland); Éva Szűcs (Hungary)

== Musical Forms ==
Musical Forms was open to men only at Madrid. Musical Forms is a non-physical competition which sees the contestants fighting against imaginary foes using Martial Arts techniques - more information can be accessed on the W.A.K.O. website, although be aware that the rules may have changed since 1990. Musical Forms at these championships was not well documented and several winners are absent, but from the existing records it would appear that the Netherlands were the most successful nation with one gold and one silver.

=== Men's Musical Forms Medals Table ===
Event	Gold	Silver	Bronze
Soft Styles	Earl Blijd (Netherlands)	Simon Keith (United Kingdom)	Name unknown (Republic of Ireland)
Weapons	Medallist not recorded	Earl Blijd (Netherlands)	Medallist not recorded

== Overall Medals Standing (Top 5) ==
Ranking	Country	Gold (gold)	Silver (silver)	Bronze (bronze)
1	(United Kingdom) Great Britain	7	7	3
2	West Germany	6	3	6
3	Italy	5	9	6
4	Hungary	4	1	6
5	Poland	2	1	4

== See also ==
- List of WAKO Amateur European Championships
- List of WAKO Amateur World Championships
