= W.A.K.O. World Championships 1993 (Atlantic City) =

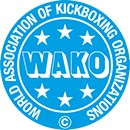
- The poster for W.A.K.O. World Championships 1993 (Atlantic City)
- Promotion: W.A.K.O.
- Date: November 4 (Start); November 6, 1993 (End)
- Venue: Trump Taj Mahal
- City: (United States) Atlantic City, NJ, USA

Event chronology
W.A.K.O. European Championships 1992	W.A.K.O. World Championships 1993 (Atlantic City)	W.A.K.O. World Championships 1993 (Budapest)

W.A.K.O. World Championships 1993 in Atlantic City were the joint ninth world kickboxing championships hosted by the W.A.K.O. organization arranged by W.A.K.O. USA president Jim Lantrip. As with the 1985 championships the organization had suffered a temporary split due to political differences, and a second event was planned later in the month in Budapest, although the differences would be resolved in the near future.

The Atlantic City championships were open to amateur men and women, with thirty-one countries taking part, and styles on offer included Semi-Contact, Light-Contact and Musical Forms. Christine Bannon-Rodrigues, who had made history at the 1991 championships, repeated the feat by winning a further three gold medals and proving the first time was no fluke. By the end of the event, hosts USA were the strongest nation, with Hungary second and Germany third. It was held at the Trump Taj Mahal in Atlantic City, NJ, USA over three days - starting on Thursday, 4 November and ending on Saturday, 6 November 1993.

== Semi-Contact ==
Semi-Contact is a form of kickboxing in which fights were won by points given due to technique, skill and speed, with physical force limited - more information on Semi-Contact can be found on the W.A.K.O. website, although the rules will have changed since 1993. The men had eight weight divisions ranging from 57 kg/125.4 lbs to over 89 kg/+195.8 lbs, with the under/over 89 kg divisions being newly introduced. The women's competition also expanded, now having five divisions, ranging from 50 kg/110 lbs to over 65 kg/143 lbs. As with the last world championships in London, Christine Bannon-Rodrigues was the most notable winner as she repeated her three gold medal feat - winning in Semi-Contact as well in Musical Forms (x2), while Lajos Hugyetz would win two golds (winning in Light-Contact as well), and karate fighter Tony Young was a further notable winner. By the end of the championships the strongest country in Semi-Contact was the host nation USA with four golds, two silvers and six bronzes.

=== Men's Semi-Contact Kickboxing Medals Table ===
Event	Gold	Silver	Bronze
-57 kg	Oliver Drexler (Germany)	Bruno Manca (Italy)	Lantos Gyla (Hungary); Bernd Duffy (Republic of Ireland)
-63 kg	Tony Young (United States)	Maurizio Cuccu (Italy)	Martin Kilgus (Germany); Hardus Laurens (South Africa)
-69 kg	Pedro Xavier (Cape Verde)	Mike Conroy (United States)	Billy Bryce (England); István Tóth (Hungary)
-74 kg	Lajos Hugyetz (Hungary)	Emanuele Bozzolani (Italy)	Franjo Zobic (Austria); Chris Rappold (United States)
-79 kg	Ralf Kunzler (Germany)	Stefan Martin (Switzerland)	Markus Zadra (Italy); Peter Edwards (England)
-84 kg	Alfie Lewis (England)	Zoltan Szucs (Hungary)	Jerry Fontanez (United States); Volpato Diego (Italy)
-89 kg	Emanuel Bettencourt (Cape Verde)	Barnabas Katona (Hungary)	Steve Babcock (United States); Maik Böttcher (Germany)
+89 kg	Alvin Mighty (England)	Ali Özkan (Turkey)	Richard Plowden (United States); Volpato Diego (Germany)

=== Women's Semi-Contact Kickboxing Medals Table ===
Event	Gold	Silver	Bronze
-50 kg	Lori Lantrip-Stanley (United States)	Amanda Quansah (England)	Tiziana Favaro (Italy); Rita Pesuth (Hungary)
-55 kg	Christine Bannon-Rodrigues (United States)	Miriam Diller (Germany)	Ann-May Viksund (Norway); Nancy Morneau (Canada)
-60 kg	Kierston Sims (United States)	Christina Senigalia (Italy)	Carla Ribeiro (Brazil); Manon Desrochers (Canada)
-65 kg	Dawn Roffey (Canada)	Michelle Arango (United States)	Tunde Kocsis (Hungary); Eunice Huthard (United States)
+65 kg	Tiziana Zennaro (Italy)	Carylanne Lamb (England)	Nicola Corbett (Republic of Ireland); Sue Brazelton (United States)

== Light-Contact ==
More physical than Semi-Contact but less so than Full-Contact, points were awarded and fights won on the basis of speed and technique over power, and it was seen as a transition stage for fighters who were considering a move from Semi to Full-Contact. More information on Light-Contact rules can be found of the W.A.K.O. website, although be aware that the rules may have changed since 1993. As with Semi-Contact, the men and women had new weight divisions, with the men having eight ranging from 57 kg/125.4 lbs to over 89 kg/+195.8 lbs, and the women five, ranging from 50 kg/110 lbs to over 65 kg/143 lbs. Notable winners included Lajos Hugyetz (who also won gold in Semi-Contact) and future pro boxing champion Pelé Reid, who added to the gold he had won at the last W.A.K.O. Europeans. By the end of the championships Hungary was by far the most successful nation in Light-Contact, winning six golds, one silver and one bronze medal.

=== Men's Light-Contact Kickboxing Medals Table ===
Event	Gold	Silver	Bronze
-57 kg	Lantos Gyula (Hungary)	Piotr Siegoczynski (Poland)	Spanu Gianpaolo (Italy); Gabriel Damm (Germany)
-63 kg	Jorge Coelho (Germany)	Chad Barron (United States)	Joachim Wage-Mons (Belgium); Silvano Cosentino (South Africa)
-69 kg	István Tóth (Hungary)	Sergei Kirpjakov (Latvia)	Piotr Bartnicki (Poland); Ottavio Panunzio (Italy)
-74 kg	Lajos Hugyetz (Hungary)	Michael Wübke (Germany)	Haci Avcioglu (Turkey); Dimitri Smirnov (Belgium)
-79 kg	Herman Muhlheim (Switzerland)	Bernd Reichenbach (Germany)	Piotr Panczuk (Poland); Ali Chehadeh (Lebanon)
-84 kg	Zoltan Szucs (Hungary)	Stefan Dietrich (Germany)	Martin Cantin (Canada); Bartolomeo Bonvino (Italy)
-89 kg	Jean-Marc Koumba (Germany)	Victor Chicko (Commonwealth of Independent States)	Abundio Munoz (United States); Nuno Souto (Cape Verde)
+89 kg	Pelé Reid (England)	William Eaves (United States)	Mladen Paylin (Slovenia); Sascha Beganovic (Switzerland)

=== Women's Light-Contact Kickboxing Medals Table ===
Event	Gold	Silver	Bronze
-50 kg	Rita Pesuth (Hungary)	Giovanna Neglia (Italy)	Shelly Taylor (United States); Amanda Quansah (England)
-55 kg	Iwona Guzowska (Poland)	Lorraine Cotter (Republic of Ireland)	Marianna Hegyi (Hungary); Ann-May Viksund (Norway)
-60 kg	Gaby Bada (Hungary)	Caroline Suter (Switzerland)	Ulrike Wörz (Germany); Linda Dice (United States)
-65 kg	Birgid Sasse (Germany)	Tunde Kocsis (Hungary)	Justina Hall (United States); Marta Kickner (Poland)
+65 kg	Christina Cerpi (Italy)	Lisa Crosby (United States)	Doris Aboagye (England); Claudia Schregele (Germany)

== Forms ==
Musical Forms is a non-physical competition which sees the contestants fighting against imaginary foes using Martial Arts techniques - more information can be accessed on the W.A.K.O. website, although be aware that the rules may have changed since 1993. The men and women were allowed to participate in four different styles explained below:

- Hard Styles – coming from Karate and Taekwondo.
- Soft Styles – coming from Kung Fu and Wu-Shu.
- Hard Styles with Weapons – using weapons such as Kama, Sai, Tonfa, Nunchaku, Bō, Katana.
- Soft Styles with Weapons - using weapons such as Naginata, Nunchaku, Tai Chi Chuan Sword, Whip Chain.

The most notable winner was Christine Bannon-Rodrigues who claimed two gold medals in Soft Styles and Soft Styles with Weapons to add to the gold she won in Semi-Contact to equal the record she had set at the last W.A.K.O. world championships of three gold medals in a single event. By the end of the championships the host nation USA were the top nation in Musical Forms, winning four golds and three silvers.

=== Men's Musical Forms Medals Table ===
Event	Gold	Silver	Bronze
Hard Styles	Dominic Adam (Canada)	Gabe Reynaga (United States)	Pedro Xavier (Cape Verde)
Soft Styles	Richard Brandon (United States)	Earl Blijd (Netherlands)	Emanuel Bettencourt (Cape Verde)
Hard Styles with Weapons	Alan Belisle (Canada)	Werner Stark (Germany)	Pedro Xavier (Cape Verde)
Soft Styles with Weapons	Richard Brandon (United States)	Sylvester Engelhart (Netherlands)	Anthony Spatola (Germany)

=== Women's Musical Forms Medals Table ===
Event	Gold	Silver	Bronze
Hard Styles	Patricia Lamoureux (Canada)	Stacy Knight (United States)	Caroline Suter (Switzerland)
Soft Styles	Christine Bannon-Rodrigues (United States)	Natali Bordijan (Russia)	Tatjana Anjenko (Russia)
Hard Styles with Weapons	Manon Desrochers (Canada)	Michelle Arrango (United States)	No bronze medallist recorded
Soft Styles with Weapons	Christine Bannon-Rodrigues (United States)	Natali Bordijan (Russia)	Tatjana Anjenko (Russia)

== Overall Medals Standing (Top 5) ==
Ranking	Country	Gold (gold)	Silver (silver)	Bronze (bronze)
1	(United States) USA	8	8	10
2	Hungary	7	3	5
3	Germany	5	5	5
4	Canada	5	0	3
5	England	3	2	4

== See also ==
- List of WAKO Amateur World Championships
- List of WAKO Amateur European Championships
