= Anthony Young =

Anthony Young may refer to:

- Anthony Young (American football) (born 1963), American NFL defensive back
- Anthony Young (baseball) (1966–2017), American Major League Baseball pitcher
- Anthony Young (cyclist) (1900–1970), American Olympic cyclist
- Anthony Young (musician) (1683–1747), English organist and composer
- Anthony Young, Baron Young of Norwood Green (born 1942), British politician and Labour Party life peer
- Anthony M. Young (born 1943), Australian mycologist
- Anthony W. Young (1866–1948), Florida politician

== See also ==
- Tony Young (disambiguation)
