= W.A.K.O. European Championships 1988 =

European kickboxing championships

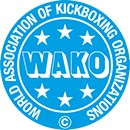
- The poster for W.A.K.O. European Championships 1988
- Promotion: W.A.K.O.
- Date: 1988
- Venue: Palasport Taliercio
- City: Mestre, Italy

Event chronology
W.A.K.O. World Championships 1987	W.A.K.O. European Championships 1988	W.A.K.O. World Championships 1990

W.A.K.O. European Championships 1988 were the ninth European kickboxing championships hosted by the W.A.K.O. organization arranged by W.A.K.O. president Ennio Falsoni. The event was open to amateur men and women based in Europe only, with two categories on offer; Semi-Contact (both sexes) and Light-Contact (men only), with Light-Contact being introduced for the first time ever at a W.A.K.O. event. As decided by WAKO's world congress in Munich 1987, international championship are to be split up into two events and locations to accommodate fighters for newly added Light-Contact and later Low-Kick. Therefore, European championships for Full-Contact kickboxing and Forms took place at a separate event in Trogir, Yugoslavia. Each country was allowed one competitor per weight class per category. By the end of the event, hosts Italy were the top nation across all categories, with Great Britain second and regular European leaders West Germany in the third. It was held at the Palasport Taliercio in Mestre, Italy in 1988.

== Semi-Contact ==
Both men and women took part in Semi-Contact competitions in Mestre. Semi-Contact differed from Full-Contact in that fights were won by points given due to technique, skill and speed, with physical force limited - more information on Semi-Contact can be found on the W.A.K.O. website, although the rules will have changed since 1988. At Mestre the men had seven weight classes, starting at 57 kg/125.4 lbs and ending at over 84 kg/+184.8 lbs, while the women's competition had four weight classes beginning at 50 kg/110 lbs and ending at over 60 kg/132 lbs. By the end of the championships, host nation Italy were the top country in Semi-Contact with six golds, one silver and one bronze medal.

=== Men's Semi-Contact Kickboxing Medals Table ===
Event	Gold	Silver	Bronze
-57 kg	Maurizio Cuccu (Italy)	Oliver Drexler (West Germany)	Gerhard Schatz (Austria)
-63 kg	Gaetano Sambataro (Italy)	Zsoltan Polgar (Hungary)	Isa Acar (Turkey)
-69 kg	Francesco Arnone (Italy)	Robert Ulbricht (West Germany)	Jones Hortobaji (Hungary); Bob Bodson (Belgium)
-74 kg	Chris William (United Kingdom)	Lajos Hugyetz (Hungary)	Massimo Galozzi (Italy); Roy Baker (Republic of Ireland)
-79 kg	Wayne Benoni (United Kingdom)	Rudolph Soos (Hungary)	Stephan Plattner (Austria); Yilmaz Yaka (Turkey)
-84 kg	Michele Surian (Italy)	Alfie Lewis (United Kingdom)	Guner Lentz (Turkey); Barnabas Katoona (Hungary)
+84 kg	Andrew Boyce (United Kingdom)	Thomas Brunnier (Switzerland)	Michael Dunleavy (Republic of Ireland); Edward Strand (Austria)

=== Women's Semi-Contact Kickboxing Medals Table ===
Event	Gold	Silver	Bronze
-50 kg	Marian Egrich (Hungary)	Debbie Graham (United Kingdom)	Antonella Aversano (Italy); Karin Schiller (West Germany)
-55 kg	Barbara Englert (West Germany)	Sonia Bonazza (Italy)	Patricia Sager (Switzerland); Una Loughram (Northern Ireland)
-60 kg	Roberta Vitali (Italy)	Ute Howell (West Germany)	Maria Bene (Hungary); Noleen Murphy (Northern Ireland)
+60 kg	Tiziana Zennaro (Italy)	Gabriella Bady (Hungary)	Margaret Dent (Republic of Ireland); Noleen Murphy (Northern Ireland)

== Light-Contact ==
Light-Contact made its W.A.K.O. championships debut in Mestre. It involved more physicality than Semi-Contact but less so than Full-Contact, with emphasis put on speed, skill and technique over power. It was also seen as a stepping stone for fighters who were looking to make the transaction from Semi to Full-Contact. More information on Light-Contact rules can be found of the W.A.K.O. website, although be aware that the rules may have changed since 1988. At Mestre only men would take part in Light-Contact, with six weight classes, starting at 57 kg/125.4 lbs and ending at over 84 kg//+184.8 lbs. West Germany were the strongest nation in Light-Contact, winning three golds, two silvers and one bronze.

=== Men's Light-Contact Kickboxing Medals Table ===
Event	Gold	Silver	Bronze
-57 kg	Jakob Jurgen (West Germany)	Gianni Morigi (Italy)	Michael Crane (Republic of Ireland); Attila Balough (Hungary)
-63 kg	Silvano Cosentino (Italy)	Axel Briesenik (West Germany)	Alan Johnson (Republic of Ireland); Marek Drazosynski (Poland)
-74 kg	Ralf Kunzler (West Germany)	Lajos Hugyetz (Hungary)	Robert Steiner (Switzerland); Martin Gibbons (Republic of Ireland)
-79 kg	George McKenzie (United Kingdom)	Alain Lonnedy (Belgium)	Andreas Lindemann (West Germany); Franz Haberl (Austria)
-84 kg	Karl-Heinz Martin (West Germany)	Barnabas Katona (Hungary)	Alessandro Milan (Italy); Jerje Nordal (Norway)
+84 kg	Raymond McKenzie (United Kingdom)	Gerald Hellman (West Germany)	Steve Makawaya (Belgium); Zoltan Szucs (Hungary)

== Overall Medals Standing (Top 5) ==
Ranking	Country	Gold (gold)	Silver (silver)	Bronze (bronze)
1	Italy	7	2	3
2	(United Kingdom) Great Britain	5	2	0
3	West Germany	4	5	2
4	Hungary	1	6	5
5	Belgium	0	1	2
5	Switzerland	0	1	2

== See also ==
- List of WAKO Amateur European Championships
- List of WAKO Amateur World Championships
