= Linda Denley =

American martial artist

- Born: August 8, 1960 (age 66); Houston, Texas, United States
- Nationality: (United States) American
- Division: Heavyweight
- Style: Tang Soo Do, Taekwondo
- Rank: 10th degree black belt in Tang Soo Do

Linda Denley
Medal record

Representing United States

Semi-Contact Kickboxing

WAKO Amateur World Championships
Gold medal – first place	1985 London	60+ kg
Gold medal – first place	1987 Munich, Germany	60+ kg
Gold medal – first place	1990 Mestre, Italy	60+ kg

Linda Denley (born August 8, 1960) is a martial artist from Houston, Texas. She is widely considered one of the greatest Karate point fighters and semi-contact kickboxers of all time. From 1973 to 1996, she was the top-ranked female point fighter in the world and went her first nine years competing without a single loss. She accumulated over 70 titles, including winning the Battle of Atlanta 11 times, the U.S. Open nine times, and the U.S. Capitol Classic nine times. She made history in semi-contact kickboxing, becoming the first American woman to win a WAKO world title and was the first black woman to be Black Belt Magazine's Competitor of the Year. She also appeared in several movies, including Jackie Chan's Armour of God and Chuck Norris's Sidekicks.

== Early life ==
Denley was one of twelve children and a natural-born athlete. While still in high school, she qualified for the Olympics in five track and field events. However, her professional winnings on the karate circuit made her ineligible for the Olympics. She was also a talented volleyball and basketball player being asked to play semi-pro for the Houston Angels.

She initially walked into a karate school in 1972 simply to fill a free hour in her schedule, with no intention of fighting. Denley began her training under instructors Alfredo and Robert Torres. She was a reluctant starter, breaking into tears during her first sparring session, but quickly displayed a natural talent. She earned her black belt in Tang Soo Do in 1975.

== Fighting career ==
Denley became one of the most dominant point fighters in history. She was known for her aggressive, hard-hitting style, crab style and fierce competitive spirit, with a simple philosophy: "I just want to win all the time."

From 1973 to 1996, she was the top-ranked female point fighter in the world. She went her first nine years competing without a single loss. She accumulated over 70 titles, including winning the Battle of Atlanta 11 times, the U.S. Open nine times, and the U.S. Capitol Classic nine times. She won the Diamond Nationals in 1984, 1985 and 1987. She is also known for several wins over Olympic Taekwondo Gold medalist Arlene Limas.

She made history in semi-contact kickboxing, becoming the first American woman to win a WAKO world title in London (1985). She successfully defended her title in Germany (1987), and Italy (1990), making her the first female to hold three consecutive world titles.

== Martial Arts Halls of Fame ==
Linda Denley's legendary status is cemented by her inductions into multiple prestigious Halls of Fame.

· Black Belt Magazine Hall of Fame (1980): In 1980, she became the first Black woman ever inducted into the Black Belt Hall of Fame, where she was named Competitor of the Year for her utter dominance in the point karate world.

· NASKA Hall of Fame (1994): Inducted by the North American Sport Karate Association, the leading organization for the sport karate circuit where she reigned supreme.

· Diamond Nationals Hall of Fame (1989): Inducted by one of the major, long-running tournaments where she was a multiple-time champion.

· Mars Hall of Fame (1988): Another major martial arts Hall of Fame that recognized her as "Competitor of the Year."

== Life After Fighting ==
After her competitive career, Denley transitioned into a skilled instructor and school owner. She is the owner and chief instructor at the Texas Black Belt Academy in Houston, a role she has held for over 45 years. She has achieved the high ranks of 10th degree in Tang Soo Do and 4th degree in Taekwondo

She continues to promote her annual Space City Open Karate Championships and conducts seminars nationwide. She emphasizes teaching her students to be "black belts" in all aspects of life.

== Acting ==
Denley also appeared in several movies, including Jackie Chan's Armour of God, Chuck Norris's Sidekicks, and Killpoint with Leo Fong and Richard Roundtree. She also appeared on the television show Walker, Texas Ranger.
