= Przemysław Saleta =

Polish kickboxer, boxer and mixed martial arts fighter

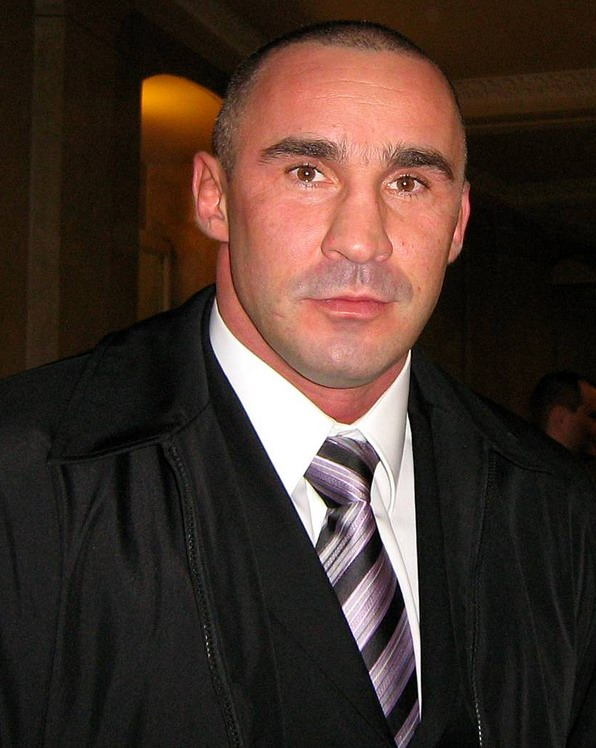
- Saleta in 2007
- Born: 7 March 1968 (age 58); Wrocław, Poland
- Other names: Chemek
- Nationality: Polish
- Height: 6 ft 5 in (1.96 m)
- Weight: 242 lb (110 kg; 17.3 st)
- Division: Heavyweight
- Style: Boxing, kickboxing
- Fighting out of: Warsaw, Poland
- Years active: 1991–present (boxing); 2005–2011 (K-1); 2007–2010 (MMA)

Professional boxing record
- Total: 52
- Wins: 44
- By knockout: 21
- Losses: 8
- By knockout: 7

Mixed martial arts record
- Total: 2
- Wins: 1
- By submission: 1
- Losses: 1
- By submission: 1

Other information
- Website: www.przemyslawsaleta.com
- Boxing record from BoxRec
- Mixed martial arts record from Sherdog
- Last updated on: 23 August 2015

Przemysław Saleta (born 7 March 1968) is a Polish professional boxer, as well as a former kickboxer and mixed martial artist. Later he became an actor and sports commentator as well as a TV personality.

== Achievements ==
Kickboxing:

- 1990 W.A.K.O. World Championships in Madrid, Spain (gold) -91 kg (Full-Contact)
- 1990 W.A.K.O. World Championships in Mestre, Italy (gold) -91 kg (Full-Contact)
- I.S.K.A. world champion
- I.S.K.A. European champion
- Polish Championship

Boxing:

- 2002 E.B.U. European heavyweight champion (0 title defences)
- 2001 Polish international heavyweight champion
- 1999 I.B.O. intercontinental cruiserweight champion (0 title defences)
- 1994 W.B.C. international cruiserweight champion
- 1992 Florida State cruiserweight champion (2 title defences)

== Boxing ==
After a successful kickboxing career, Saleta became a professional boxer in 1991, fighting at cruiserweight. He won his first three fights by knockout before suffering his first defeat at the hands of Tim Martin in his fourth bout in 1992. After a one-point victory over an aging Dennis Andries in 1994, he was named as part of Ring Magazine's Top 10. He fell out of that list later that year, however, when he was knocked out by John McClain in the first round.

In 1995, he moved up to the heavyweight division and on December 9, 1995, he fought Croatian Željko Mavrović for the EBU Heavyweight title, but lost by KO in the first round.

He then remained inactive for almost two years. In May 2001, he won the Polish Heavyweight Championship by beating Ratko Draskovic via unanimous decision and on July 20, 2002, he was given another shot at the European title against the unbeaten defending champion Luan Krasniqi. Krasniqi dominated the start of the fight and was clearly well ahead on points. In the second half of the fight, he suffered stamina problems that led him to give up after the eighth round.

In his first defense of the European Championship title three months later, he met Sinan Samil Sam and was knocked out in the seventh round. Also, in the subsequent rematch against Krasniqi, he lost by TKO in the first. After a further two-year break, he returned in 2005 to beat Raman Sukhaterin and then again in a loss to Oliver McCall. In his last bout before retirement from the sport, he defeated American Ed Perry by unanimous decision in February 2006 to bring his record to 43 wins and 7 losses.

== Mixed martial arts ==
On June 2, 2007, Saleta made his mixed martial arts debut against Belarusian opponent Martin Malhasyan at KSW VII. He lost the fight by a rear-naked choke in the first round.

Despite his retirement from professional sport, he then returned to action after calling out fellow ex-boxer Marcin Najman at KSW XIV in September 2010. Both used to be friends and are known to have an ongoing feud which goes back a number of years. Personal insults in press happened regularly before and even after the fight, which Saleta won by submission due to a forearm choke.

== Media career ==
From January 2007 to November 2007, Saleta was part of the Polish edition of Gentleman's Magazine, and from September 28 to November 16, 2007, he was a contestant on the Polish version of Dancing on Ice. His partner was Agata Rosłońska. However, they resigned after the 8th round of the program. He also took part in the Polish version of Fort Boyard. Since October 6, 2008, he has been running his program Gadżety Salety on Polsat Play Channel.

=== Private life ===
He was married twice. His first wife was Ewa Pacula, a former Polish model. They have a daughter named Nicola, born in 1994. His second wife was Ewa Byzdra-Saleta. They have a daughter named Nadia, born in 2002.

== K-1 record ==
Result	Record	Opponent	Method	Round	Time	Event	Date	Location
Win	2-0-0	(Poland) Marcin Najman	TKO (strikes)	1	0:54	MMA Attack	05.11.2011	(Poland) Warsaw, Torwar Hall
Win	1-0-0	(Poland) Marcin Różalski	Decision	12	5:00	25. GBZ - Boxing Europe & Glormax	27.02.2005	(Poland) Włocławek, Hall OSiR

== Mixed martial arts record ==
Professional record breakdown
2 matches	1 win	1 loss
By submission	1	1

Res.	Record	Opponent	Method	Event	Date	Round	Time	Location	Notes
Win	1-1	Marcin Najman	Submission (forearm choke)	KSW 14: Judgment Day	September 18, 2010	1	3:14	Łódź, Poland	
Loss	0-1	Martin Malchasjan	Submission (rear-naked choke)	KSW VII	June 2, 2007	1	2:43	Warsaw, Poland	MMA debut

== Professional boxing record ==
44 Wins (22 knockouts, 22 decisions, 0 disqualifications), 8 Losses, 0 Draws, 0 No Contests
Res.	Record	Opponent	Type	Rd., Time	Date	Location	Notes
Loss	44-8	(Poland) Tomasz Adamek	RTD	5	26/09/2015	Atlas Arena, Łódź, Poland	
Win	44-7	(Poland) Andrew Golota	TKO	6	23/02/2013	Gdańsk, Poland	
Win	43-7	(United States) Ed Perry	UD	6	17/02/2006	(United States) Reading, Pennsylvania, U.S.	
Loss	42-7	(United States) Oliver McCall	TKO	4	13/08/2005	(United States) Chicago, Illinois, U.S.	
Win	42-6	(Belarus) Raman Sukhaterin	UD	6	29/04/2005	Świebodzice, Poland	
Loss	41-6	(Germany) Luan Krasniqi	TKO	1	26/04/2003	Schwerin, Germany	
Loss	41-5	(Turkey) Sinan Şamil Sam	TKO	7	12/10/2002	Schwerin, Germany	Lost European heavyweight title
Win	41-4	(Germany) Luan Krasniqi	TKO	9	20/07/2002	Dortmund, Germany	Won European heavyweight title
Win	40-4	(Belarus) Mihail Bekish	UD	6	23/02/2002	Włocławek, Poland	
Win	39-4	(Ukraine) Oleksandr Myleiko	UD	6	24/11/2001	Łódź, Poland	
Win	38-4	(Serbia and Montenegro) Ratko Draskovic	UD	10	26/05/2001	Warsaw, Poland	Won Polish International heavyweight title
Win	37-4	(Ukraine) Yuriy Yelistratov	UD	6	26/06/1999	Jaworzno, Poland	
Win	36-4	(Czech Republic) Jozef Balogh	TKO	1	24/02/2001	Nowy Sącz, Poland	
Win	35-4	(Austria) Biko Botowamungu	UD	8	03/02/2001	Warsaw, Poland	
Loss	34-4	(Netherlands) Fred Westgeest	TKO	6	18/09/1999	Gdańsk, Poland	Lost IBO Inter-Continental heavyweight title
Win	34-3	(Puerto Rico) Rodolfo Marin	KO	2	26/06/1999	Wrocław, Poland	
Win	33-3	(Croatia) Asmir Vojnovic	TKO	10	17/04/1999	Warsaw, Poland	Won IBO Inter-Continental heavyweight title
Win	32-3	(France) Antoine Palatis	TKO	6	12/12/1998	Frankfurt, Germany	
Win	31-3	(United States) Gilberto Williamson	PTS	8	19/09/1998	Oberhausen, Germany	
Win	30-3	(United States) Lorenzo Boyd	TKO	4	16/05/1998	Poznań, Poland	
Win	29-3	(Hungary) Ferenc Deák	TKO	1	20/03/1998	Frankfurt, Germany	
Win	28-3	(United States) Wesley Martin	PTS	8	06/12/1997	Offenbach, Germany	
Win	27-3	(United States) Mike Robinson	PTS	8	13/06/1997	Oberhausen, Germany	
Win	26-3	(Ukraine) Yuriy Yelistratov	PTS	8	10/05/1997	Frankfurt, Germany	
Loss	25-3	(Croatia) Željko Mavrović	KO	1	09/12/1995	Stuttgart, Germany	For European heavyweight title
Win	25-2	(United States) Bradley Rone	PTS	8	26/08/1995	(United States) Chicago, Illinois, U.S.	
Win	24-2	(Hungary) Lajos Eros	PTS	8	27/05/1995	Kiel, Germany	
Win	23-2	(United States) Willie Jake	PTS	8	28/02/1995	(United States) Indianapolis, Indiana, U.S.	
Win	22-2	(United States) George O'Mara	TKO	2	10 Dec 1994	(United States) Los Angeles, California, U.S.	
Win	21-2	(United States) Brian LaSpada	PTS	8	05/11/1994	(United States) Stateline, Nevada, U.S.	
Loss	20-2	(United States) John McClain	TKO	1	27/08/1994	(United States) Bushkill, Pennsylvania, U.S.	
Win	20-1	(England) Terry Dixon	PTS	8	03/08/1994	Bristol, England	
Win	19-1	(United States) Carl Williams	PTS	10	28/04/1994	(United States) Tulsa, Oklahoma, U.S.	
Win	18-1	(England) Dennis Andries	UD	12	23/03/1994	Cardiff, Wales	Won WBC International cruiserweight title
Win	17-1	(United States) Lopez McGee	TKO	4	03/03/1994	(United States) Hammond, Indiana, U.S.	
Win	16-1	(United States) James Wilder	KO	8	29/01/1994	(United States) Bismarck, North Dakota, U.S.	
Win	15-1	(United States) Grady Smith	UD	12	03/12/1993	(United States) Orlando, Florida, U.S.	Retained Florida State cruiserweight title
Win	14-1	(United States) Guy Sonnenberg	TKO	6	22/10/1993	(United States) Orlando, Florida, U.S.	Retained Florida State cruiserweight title
Win	13-1	(United States) Eddie Curry	KO	4	24/09/1993	(United States) Gulf Shores, Alabama, U.S.	
Win	12-1	(United States) Jimmy Bills	PTS	8	04/09/1993	(United States) Las Vegas, Nevada, U.S.	
Win	11-1	(United States) Tim Richards	KO	4	11/08/1993	(United States) South Bend, Indiana, U.S.	
Win	10-1	(United States) Dale Jackson	TKO	4	24/07/1993	(United States) Atlantic City, New Jersey, U.S.	
Win	9-1	(United States) David McCluskey	TKO	5	30/04/1993	(United States) Orange Beach, Alabama, U.S.	
Win	8-1	(Jamaica) Cordwell Hylton	TKO	4	22/10/1992	London, England	
Win	7-1	(United States) Ernest Simmons	UD	12	23/06/1992	(United States) Tallahassee, Florida, U.S.	Won vacant Florida State cruiserweight title
Win	6-1	(United States) Jose Pedro Riveron	KO	2	13/06/1992	(United States) Miami, Florida, U.S.	
Win	5-1	(United States) Fred Adams	SD	6	10/04/1992	(United States) St. Petersburg, Florida, U.S.	
Win	4-1	(United States) Isaiah Slaughter	KO	4	27/03/1992	(United States) Tampa, Florida, U.S.	
Loss	3-1	(United States) Tim Martin	KO	5	20/02/1992	(United States) Rosemont, Illinois, U.S.	
Win	3-0	(United States) Anthony Abrams	TKO	5	25/01/1992	(United States) Tampa, Florida, U.S.	
Win	2-0	(England) Ian Bulloch	TKO	8	13/10/1991	Warsaw, Poland	
Win	1-0	(United States) Steve Paolilli	KO	1	29/07/1991	(United States) Pensacola, Florida, U.S.	
