= W.A.K.O. World Championships 1990 =

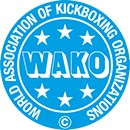
- The poster for W.A.K.O. World Championships 1990
- Promotion: W.A.K.O.
- Date: January 19 (Start); January 21, 1990 (End)
- Venue: Palasport Taliercio
- City: Mestre, Italy

Event chronology
W.A.K.O. European Championships 1988	W.A.K.O. World Championships 1990	W.A.K.O. European Championships 1990

W.A.K.O. World Championships 1990 were the seventh world kickboxing championships hosted by the W.A.K.O. organization arranged by W.A.K.O. president Ennio Falsoni. It was the second W.A.K.O. championships in a row to be hosted in Mestre (the Euros were also hosted there), and the fourth time overall in Italy, involving amateur men and women from twenty-eight countries from across the world. Originally, world championships were scheduled to take place in the USA in October 1989, but due to errors in event planning Italy saved the championships by organizing the tournament 3 months later. There were four categories on offer; Full-Contact (men only), Semi-Contact, Light-Contact (men only) and Musical Forms, with each country typically allowed one competitor per weight division (asides from women's Musical Forms). Competitors were allowed to participate in more than one category, however, with double winners in Light and Semi-Contact. By the end of a competitive championships, USA were the top nation, with Poland a close second, and Canada in third. The event was held over three days at the Palasport Taliercio in Mestre Italy, starting on Friday 19 January and ending on Sunday 21 January, 1990.

== Full-Contact ==
Returning after being absent at the last European championships, Full-Contact at Mestre was available to men only and consisted of ten weight divisions ranging from 54 kg/118.8 lbs to over 91 kg/+200.2 lbs. All bouts were fought under Full-Contact kickboxing rules - more detail on the rules can be found at the W.A.K.O. website, although be aware that they may have changed slightly since 1990. The most notable winner was future pro boxer Przemysław Saleta who won gold in the -91 kg division. By the end of the championships Poland was the strongest country in Full-Contact with three golds and one bronze.

=== Men's Full-Contact Kickboxing Medals Table ===
Event	Gold	Silver	Bronze
-54 kg	Jonny Gevriye (Sweden)	Massimo Spinelli (Italy)	Gabriel Damm (West Germany); Oszkár Balogh (Hungary)
-57 kg	Massimo Rizzoli (Italy)	Pascal Comaille (France)	Luis Diego (Spain); Murat Comert (Turkey)
-60 kg	Bogdan Sawicki (Poland)	Dennis Sigo (Sweden)	Nesradin Bilan (Belgium); Alessandro Gatto (Brazil)
-63.5 kg	János Gönczi (Hungary)	Dogan Sinan (Turkey)	Giorgio Perreca (Italy); Wojciech Wiertel (Poland)
-67 kg	Piotr Falender (Poland)	Sahah Alston (United States)	Roberto Rocchi (Italy); Patrice Prando (France)
-71 kg	Paolo Liberati (Italy)	Horst Nether (West Germany)	Chabane Bouricha (Algeria); Michael Lowengren (Sweden)
-75 kg	Ralf Kunzler (West Germany)	Nasser Nassiri (Iran)	Steve Martin (United Kingdom); Tiziano Ubaldi (Switzerland)
-81 kg	David Taylor (United Kingdom)	Pares Basilikos (Greece)	Alfonso Sgarro (Brazil); Paul Thorsten (West Germany)
-91 kg	Przemysław Saleta (Poland)	Said Bechari (France)	Eirik Lutken (Norway); Nik Askitis (Greece)
+91 kg	Philippe Coutelas (France)	Paolo Zorello (Brazil)	Dusko Malovic (Socialist Federal Republic of Yugoslavia); Angelo Spreafico (Italy)

== Semi-Contact ==
Both men and women took part in Semi-Contact competitions at Mestre. Semi-Contact differed from Full-Contact in that fights were won by points given due to technique, skill and speed, with physical force limited - more information on Semi-Contact can be found on the W.A.K.O. website, although the rules will have changed since 1990. At Mestre the men had seven weight classes, starting at 57 kg/125.4 lbs and ending at over 84 kg/+184.8 lbs, while the women's competition had four weight classes beginning at 50 kg/110 lbs and ending at over 60 kg/132 lbs. The most notable winner was Piotr Siegoczynski who also won a gold at the same event in the Light-Contact category. By the end of the championships, USA was the top nation in Semi-Contact winning four golds, one silver and three bronzes.

=== Men's Semi-Contact Kickboxing Medals Table ===
Event	Gold	Silver	Bronze
-57 kg	Piotr Siegoczynski (Poland)	Cuccu Maurizio (Italy)	Abidin Uz (Turkey); Attila Balogh (Hungary)
-63 kg	Peter Gilpin (Canada)	Polgar Zsolt (Hungary)	Hassin Chardbani (Morocco); Joachin Weiphrdt (West Germany)
-69 kg	Billy Bryce (United Kingdom)	Ibrahim Triqui (Turkey)	Bobby O'Neil (Northern Ireland); Yves Lalonde (Canada)
-74 kg	Jay Bell (United States)	Andreas Lindemann (West Germany)	Sergio Portaro (Italy); Ibrahim Centintas (Turkey)
-79 kg	Anthony Holloway (United States)	Gianna Peruchetti (Switzerland)	Yaka Yilmaz (Turkey); Milan Alessandro (Italy)
-84 kg	Alfie Lewis (United Kingdom)	Eric Depaite (Canada)	Hakim Alston (United States); Peter Berndt (West Germany)
+84 kg	Steve Anderson (United States)	Tony Syces (United Kingdom)	Michael Dunleavy (Republic of Ireland); Peter Hainke (West Germany)

=== Women's Semi-Contact Kickboxing Medals Table ===
Event	Gold	Silver	Bronze
-50 kg	Aquilano Eulalia (Italy)	Lori Lantrip (United States)	Katalin Lőrinczy (Hungary); Deya Yappak (Turkey)
-55 kg	Manon Desrochers (Canada)	Amabile Reasilvia (Italy)	Christine Bannon (United States); Márta Bene (Hungary)
-60 kg	Betty Hills (Canada)	Gabriella Bády (Hungary)	Roberta Vitali (Italy); Elsa Cordero (United States)
+60 kg	Linda Denley (United States)	Tiziana Zennaro (Italy)	Tünde Kocsis (Hungary); Nichole Corbett (Northern Ireland)

== Light-Contact ==
Light-Contact made its first appearance at a W.A.K.O. world championships, having made its debut at the Europeans two years previously. More physical than Semi-Contact but less so than Full-Contact, points were awarded and fights won on the basis of speed and technique over power, and it was seen as a transition stage for fighters who were considering a move from Semi to Full-Contact. More information on Light-Contact rules can be found of the W.A.K.O. website, although be aware that the rules may have changed since 1990. Only men were allowed to take part in the category, with seven weight classes available, starting at 57 kg/125.4 lbs and ending at over 84 kg/+184.8 lbs. The most notable winner was Piotr Siegoczynski who also won a gold at the same event in the Semi-Contact category. Hungary was the top nation in Light-Contact with three golds, one silver and two bronze medals.

=== Men's Light-Contact Kickboxing Medals Table ===
Event	Gold	Silver	Bronze
-57 kg	Piotr Siegoczynski (Poland)	Jakob Jurgen (West Germany)	Attila Balogh (Hungary); Uc Abidin (Turkey)
-63 kg	Rafael Nieto (United Kingdom)	Peter Gilpin (Canada)	Polgar Zsolt (Hungary); Jean Luc Kitoko (France)
-69 kg	Marek Drazdzynski (Poland)	Rodrigue Listoir (France)	Claudio Pattarino (Italy); Christoph Walder (Austria)
-74 kg	Heinz Bresser (West Germany)	István Tóth (Hungary)	Giuseppe Paladino (Italy); Martin Gibbons (United States)
-79 kg	Lajos Hugyetz (Hungary)	Tim Flood (Canada)	Franz Haber (Austria); Douglas Vincent (France)
-84 kg	Zoltan Szucs (Hungary)	Nori Carlo (Italy)	Mike Schuhmann (United States); Carl-Heinz Martin (West Germany)
+84 kg	Barnabas Katona (Hungary)	Torstein Fossnes (Norway)	Ray McKenzie (United Kingdom); Alex Edoo (France)

== Musical Forms ==
After being absent from the European championships in Mestre, Musical forms returned to a W.A.K.O. championships. The event was open to men and women; although the women's category was for demonstration purposes and although the female medal winners would be recorded by W.A.K.O. as champions, their medals would not count towards their country's final medal tally at the end of the event. The men had three categories; hard style, soft styles and weapons, while the women just had the one. Musical Forms is a non-physical competition which sees the contestants fighting against imaginary foes using Martial Arts techniques - more information can be accessed on the W.A.K.O. website, although be aware that the rules may have changed since 1990. By the end of the championships, the USA were the top nation in Musical Forms, winning two gold medals and one silver medal.

=== Men's Musical Forms Medals Table ===
Event	Gold	Silver	Bronze
Hard Styles	Jean Frenette (Canada)	Warren Garrett (United States)	Lino Guarnaccia (Italy)
Soft Styles	Karl Romain (United States)	Enrico Giachero (Italy)	Kirstin Waldberg (West Germany)
Weapons	Kevin Thompson (United States)	Mike Bernardo (Canada)	Bob Fermor (Northern Ireland)

=== Women's Musical Forms Medals Table ===
Event	Gold	Silver	Bronze
Women Musical Forms	Christine Bannon (United States)	Elsa Cordero (United States)	Kathy Quan (United States)

== Overall Medals Standing (Top 5) ==
Note that women's Musical Forms winners are not counted in the final medals standings. See Musical Forms section above for more information.

Ranking	Country	Gold (gold)	Silver (silver)	Bronze (bronze)
1	(United States) USA	6	3	4
2	Poland	6	0	1
3	Canada	4	4	1
4	Hungary	4	3	6
5	(United Kingdom) Great Britain	4	1	2

== See also ==
- List of WAKO Amateur World Championships
- List of WAKO Amateur European Championships
