= Mykola Kravchenko (sports administrator) =

- Микола Кравченко
- Born: Mykola Serhiyovych Kravchenko; 21 October 1987 (age 39); Sumy, Ukraine
- Citizenship: Ukraine
- Occupations: Sports administrator, boxing promoter, entrepreneur

Mykola Serhiyovych Kravchenko (born 21 October 1987 in Sumy) is a Ukrainian sports administrator, public figure and entrepreneur. He is the founder of the BALU sports club and the "Ba.Lu" charitable foundation, president of the Sumy Regional Boxing Federation and, since 2025, vice-president of the Boxing Federation of Ukraine. He also heads the WAKO kickboxing federation in Sumy Oblast and the Sumy regional branch of the MMA Federation of Ukraine.

== Biography ==
Kravchenko was born in Sumy. He trained in WAKO kickboxing and other martial arts. According to the sports media, he is a multiple-time Ukrainian champion, a European champion and a medalist at the WAKO World Championships, and holds the title of Master of Sports of Ukraine, International Class.

== Sports career ==
Kravchenko founded the BALU sports club in Sumy, which trains athletes in boxing, kickboxing and mixed martial arts. He also founded the promotion Balu Fighting League Pro (BFL Pro), which stages professional boxing and martial arts events. His activity in Sumy Oblast has been associated with the development of youth sport.

== Boxing Federation of Ukraine ==
Kravchenko heads the Sumy Regional Boxing Federation. In December 2025 he was elected vice-president of the Boxing Federation of Ukraine. In this role he is responsible for the development of boxing in central Ukraine, the coordination of club-level boxing, and involvement in preparing the Ukrainian national team for the 2028 Summer Olympics. In 2025 he took part in a public debate over the reform of the federation and the role of regional federations.

In 2025 the World Boxing Council (WBC) announced the creation of a WBC Eurasia structure to develop boxing across Eurasian countries. In January 2026 Kravchenko was appointed Vice President of WBC Eurasia in charge of European countries.

== Charitable activities ==
Following the start of the full-scale Russian invasion of Ukraine, Kravchenko has taken part in charitable and volunteer work. He heads the "Ba.Lu" charitable foundation, which supports youth sport, social and medical institutions and provides aid to the Armed Forces of Ukraine and to civilians. Foundation volunteers assist with recovery from Russian shelling in Sumy Oblast, including clearing the aftermath of enemy strikes. Another area of the foundation's work is the rehabilitation of veterans of the Russo-Ukrainian War. Kravchenko takes part in the "Gratitude to Heroes" project, run by the foundation together with the NGO PALAI.
