= Christine Bannon-Rodrigues =

American actor and martial artist

- Born: November 6, 1966 (age 59); Warwick, Rhode Island, United States
- Nationality: (United States) American
- Height: 1.68 m (5 ft 6 in)
- Weight: 55 kg (121 lb; 8.7 st)
- Division: Bantamweight
- Style: Kenpō, Wushu
- Stance: Southpaw
- Team: Team Paul Mitchell; Don Rodrigues Karate Academy
- Trainer: Paul Mitchell; Don Rodrigues
- Rank: 9th degree black belt in Oki-ryu

Christine Bannon-Rodrigues
Medal record

Representing United States

Semi-Contact Kickboxing

WAKO Amateur World Championships
Bronze medal – third place	1990 Mestre, Italy	55 kg
Gold medal – first place	1991 London	55 kg
Gold medal – first place	1993 Atlantic City	55 kg

Christine Bannon-Rodrigues (born November 6, 1966) is an American martial artist, actress, stunt person, and choreographer.

== Biography ==
A student of Don Rodrigues, Bannon-Rodrigues is a 9th degree black belt. She was a top ranked karate point fighter and semi-contact kickboxer, and forms champion with and without weapons. She won Black Belt Magazine's Female Competitor of the year in 1989.

She holds 9 World Championships, including consecutive 3-time World Titles at the W.A.K.O. Games. In 1990 at the W.A.K.O. World Championships Bannon-Rodrigues took bronze in Women's Semi-Contact Kickboxing and took gold in Women's Musical Forms. In 1991 at the W.A.K.O. World Championships Bannon-Rodrigues took gold in Women's Semi-Contact Kickboxing, Women's Musical Forms Soft Styles and Weapons. In 1993 at the W.A.K.O. World Championships Bannon-Rodrigues took gold in Women's Semi-Contact Kickboxing, Women's Musical Forms Soft Styles and Soft Style Weapons. 1995 Bannon-Rodrigues won gold in W.A.K.O. Pro World Champion Women’s Lightweight Fighting, and won gold again at the 1999 W.A.K.O. World Champion Women’s Lightweight Fighting.

Bannon-Rodrigues has acted for both film and television, including the feature films Sci-Fighter (aka X-Treme Fighter) and 27 Dresses. Her stunt work can be seen in a number of Hollywood productions, including Underdog, Batman and Robin, and The Next Karate Kid. Christine has appeared on television in WMAC Masters, and Mortal Kombat: Conquest.

In 2012 Christine did the martial arts choreography for the film Champions of the Deep (2012). In 2025 she was inducted into the Martial Arts History Museum Hall of Fame. Christine teaches at the Don Rodrigues Karate Academy, where she is a co-owner with Shihan Don Rodrigues.

== Filmography ==
Year	Film/Television	Role	Notes
1994	The Next Karate Kid	Stunt double Hilary Swank	
1995–96	WMAC Masters	Lady Lightning	also stunts
1997	Batman & Robin	Stunt double Batgirl	
1998	Mortal Kombat Conquest	Stunt double Kitana	1 episode
2004	Sci-Fighter	Virus	
2007	Underdog	Stunts	
2008	27 Dresses	Bridesmaid	
2012	Champions of the Deep	Choreographer	
2015	"The Martial Arts Kid"	Cameo As Herself	
2015	The Real Mr. Miyagi	Herself	

== Championships and accomplishments ==
=== Kickboxing ===
- WAKO Amateur World Championships
  - W.A.K.O. World Championships 1991 −55 kg/122 lb semi-contact kickboxing gold medalist (gold)
  - W.A.K.O. World Championships 1993 −55 kg/122 lb semi-contact kickboxing gold medalist (gold)
