= W.A.K.O. World Championships 1993 (Budapest) =

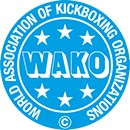
- The poster for W.A.K.O. World Championships 1993 (Budapest)
- Promotion: W.A.K.O.
- Date: 25 November (Start); 28 November 1993 (End)
- City: Budapest, Hungary
- Attendance: 3,500

Event chronology
W.A.K.O. World Championships 1993 (Atlantic City)	W.A.K.O. World Championships 1993 (Budapest)	W.A.K.O. European Championships 1994

W.A.K.O. World Championships 1993 in Budapest were the joint ninth world kickboxing championships hosted by the W.A.K.O. organization arranged by Hungarian kickboxing president Richard Leyrer. As with the 1985 world championships the organization had suffered a temporary split due to political differences, and a previous event had been held in Atlantic City earlier in the month. These political differences would be resolved in the near future and the organization would be re-united.

The Budapest event was open to amateur men and women from across the world – with 500 participants taking part from 47 countries. The styles on offer were Full-Contact, and for the first time ever at a W.A.K.O. championships, Low-Kick (more information on the styles can be found in the relevant sections below). Another first was that women could now take part in Full-Contact kickboxing, whereas before they could only take part in less physical styles. At the end of a very competitive championships, Poland were the top nation in terms of medals won, with Morocco a very close second and France just behind in third. The event was held in Budapest, Hungary over four days, starting on Thursday, 25 November and finishing on Sunday, 28 November. An estimated 3,500 spectators attended the championships.

== Full-Contact ==
Making a re-appearance to a W.A.K.O. world championships after being absent at London 1991, Full-Contact involved the participants trying to win the contest either by points or by stoppage – more detail on the rules can be found at the W.A.K.O. website, although be aware that they may have changed slightly since 1993. The men had twelve weight classes ranging from 51 kg/112.2 lbs to over 91 kg/+200.2 lbs, with several new divisions being added, while, for the first time ever, women were allowed to participate in Full-Contact at a W.A.K.O. event, with six weight divisions ranging from 48 kg/105.6 lbs to over 65 kg/+143 lbs. Poland was the strongest country in Full-Contact with four gold, one silver and one bronze medal by the end of the championships.

=== Men's Full-Contact Kickboxing Medals Table ===
Event	Gold	Silver	Bronze
Light Bantamweight -51 kg	Mariusz Cieśliński (Poland)	Irlan Mozhanov (Kazakhstan)	Vladimir Solodovnik (Autonomous Republic of Crimea); Andrej Ossirny (Commonwealth of Independent States)
Bantamweight -54 kg	Velimir Sablic (Croatia)	Djusipov Birdjan (Uzbekistan)	Laszlo Toth (Hungary); Askar Mozhanov (Kazakhstan)
Featherweight -57 kg	Mohamed Hadifi (Morocco)	Marco Lorusso (Italy)	Rinat Zagipulliw (Commonwealth of Independent States); Aleksei Ouvarov (Russia)
Lightweight -60 kg	Viktor Aksuytin (Poland)	Philippe Allagbe (France)	Yuri Zukovsky (Lithuania); Vladimir Matvinsky (Turkmenistan)
Light Welterweight -63.5 kg	Piotr Bartnicki (Poland)	Oleg Zinoviev (Ukraine)	László Szűcs (Hungary); Victor Shiderbaev (Kazakhstan)
Welterweight -67 kg	Árpád Szabó (Hungary)	Viatselav Timofeev (Ukraine)	Lionel Berger (France); Wojchech Wiertel (Poland)
Light Middleweight -71 kg	Yuri Fedun (Commonwealth of Independent States)	Yevgeni Prokudine (Tajikistan)	Valery Horushenko (Ukraine); Guran Malakanja (Serbia and Montenegro)
Middleweight -75 kg	Frank Schmidt (Germany)	Barnabas Budai (Hungary)	Peter Madsen (Denmark); Nasser Nassiri (Iran)
Light Heavyweight -81 kg	Gerald Philippot (France)	Alex Kivgilo (Autonomous Republic of Crimea)	Wieland Beust (Germany); Grigory Naumenko (Ukraine)
Cruiserweight -86 kg	Paris Vasilikos (Greece)	Jean-Marc Koumba (Germany)	Kaj Lindgren (Finland); Valentin Molchanov (Commonwealth of Independent States)
Heavyweight -91 kg	Samir Usenagić (Serbia and Montenegro)	Peter Vensen (Denmark)	Erkbnai Kutibaev (Ukraine); Jozef Charabcek (Slovakia)
Super Heavyweight +91 kg	Almaz Guismeev (Commonwealth of Independent States)	Nicolai Pychkov (Tajikistan)	Hubert Numrich (Germany); Zoran Zijan (Serbia and Montenegro)

=== Women's Full-Contact Kickboxing Medals Table ===
Event	Gold	Silver	Bronze
Bantamweight -48 kg	Michelina Giagnotti (Italy)	Marie Laure Niviere (France)	Outbihit Kaltoum (Morocco); Toula Tsolaki (Belarus)
Featherweight -52 kg	Virgine Ducros (France)	Eleni Voidou (Greece)	Aluira Nazarova (Autonomous Republic of Crimea); Jana Primodko (Commonwealth of Independent States)
Lightweight -56 kg	Snejana Bortcheva (Bulgaria)	Iwona Gozowska (Poland)	Tajana Kulida (Autonomous Republic of Crimea); Oxana Vargockaia (Ukraine)
Middleweight -60 kg	Agnieska Rylik (Poland)	Galina Gjumlijska (Bulgaria)	Lougou Mina (Belarus); Alona Tverdolchleb (Ukraine)
Light Heavyweight -65 kg	Daniella Somers (Belgium)	Stanka Savcic (Serbia and Montenegro)	Abdir Ibriq (Lebanon); Soumia Debrani (Morocco)
Heavyweight +65 kg	Dragana Ignjatić (Serbia and Montenegro)	Natalie Laufray (France)	Dani Vamvakidoy (Belarus); Leila Topic (Croatia)

== Low-Kick ==
Making its debut at a W.A.K.O. championships, Low-Kick is similar to Full-Contact kickboxing only differing in that it allowed kicks below the knee – more detail on Low-Kick rules can be found at the W.A.K.O. website, although be aware that there may have been some rule changes since 1993. Only men were allowed to participate in Low-Kick with twelve weight classes ranging from 51 kg/112.2 lbs to over 91 kg/+200.2 lbs. A notable winner was Andrei Dudko (who would later win the K-1 USA Championships 2000) taking gold in the +91 kg division. Morocco were the strongest nation in Low-Kick winning four gold medals.

=== Men's Low-Kick Kickboxing Medals Table ===
Event	Gold	Silver	Bronze
Light Bantamweight -51 kg	Dariusz Jung (Poland)	Aleksej Klitckine (Russia)	Gleb Akimov (Commonwealth of Independent States); Gabor Aburko (Hungary)
Bantamweight -54 kg	Dimitar Peshev (Bulgaria)	Ajal Borissov (Russia)	Viatcheslav Tislenko (Commonwealth of Independent States); Timur Chrednichenko (Belarus)
Featherweight -57 kg	El Bacha Sulaiman (Morocco)	Slimane Kebaili (France)	Giuseppe Grieco (Italy); Konstantin Timofeev (Russia)
Lightweight -60 kg	Yuri Bondarenko (Autonomous Republic of Crimea)	Raba Boukaz (Algeria)	Yuri Ivanov (Russia); Gilles Lachaux (France)
Light Welterweight -63.5 kg	Ahmed Gounane (Morocco)	János Gönci (Hungary)	Eugeny Desinov (Uzbekistan)
Welterweight -67 kg	Mohamed Ouali (Morocco)	Drazen Erlic (Croatia)	Vladimir Bulba (Autonomous Republic of Crimea); Csaba Molnár (Hungary)
Light Middleweight -71 kg	Andor Filo (Hungary)	Vadim Ukraincev (Commonwealth of Independent States)	Mohamed Mecherar (France); Vladimir Pashin (Autonomous Republic of Crimea)
Middleweight -75 kg	Hubert Brundu (France)	Valery Shumak (Ukraine)	Mihaly Tijzai (Hungary); Armen Maruossian (Tajikistan)
Light Heavyweight -81 kg	Mustapha Lahksem (Morocco)	Aleksander Zygostev (Belarus)	Peter Jammons (Lebanon); Bido Basovic (Bosnia and Herzegovina)
Cruiserweight -86 kg	Chatri Bowat (France)	Artem Tanajan (Belarus)	Goran Scekic (Serbia and Montenegro); Laszlo Polyak (Poland)
Heavyweight -91 kg	Andrei Churizov (Autonomous Republic of Crimea)	Sami Akin (Turkey)	Vesko Cejovic (Serbia and Montenegro); Faoy Tarraf (Lebanon)
Super Heavyweight +91 kg	Andrei Dudko (Belarus)	Andrei Bukhanuk (Autonomous Republic of Crimea)	Raynal Fucho (France); Michail Simov (Bulgaria)

== Overall Medals Standing (Top 5) ==
Ranking	Country	Gold (gold)	Silver (silver)	Bronze (bronze)
1	Poland	5	1	2
2	Morocco	5	0	2
3	France	5	5	5
4	Hungary	2	3	5
5	(Autonomous Republic of Crimea) Crimea	2	2	5

== See also ==
- List of WAKO Amateur World Championships
- List of WAKO Amateur European Championships
- List of male kickboxers
- List of female kickboxers
