= Tony Young (martial artist) =

American martial artist and teacher (born 1962)

- Born: September 8, 1962 (age 63); South Carolina, United States
- Occupation: Martial Artist
- Website: www.tonyyoungkarate.com

Anthony Young (born September 8, 1962, in Anderson, South Carolina) is an American martial artist, teacher, and practitioner of the Goju Ryu Karate style and founder of the Tony Young All-Star Karate Academy. He is also a sport karate competitor.

== Background ==
Tony Young began karate at the age of 12 and earned his Black Belt 4 years later. Tony Young is now a 10th degree Black Belt in the Goju Ryu style of karate. Tony Young was named the National Super Light Weight Karate Champion for 19 consecutive years. Tony Young has won over 1000 championship awards and prizes throughout his career. In 1997, Tony Young retired from international and national competition to focus on community affairs, business, and tournament promotions.

In 1985 Tony Young opened the Tony Young All-Star Karate Academy. Young works with Public and Private Schools in the Atlanta area and developed working relations with Billy Blanks, who is the creator and owner of Tae-Bo Aerobics.

== Competitive fighter ==
Rated the National Superlight Weight Karate Champion for 19 consecutive years by:

- The Regional Sport Karate Circuit
- The North American Sport Karate Association
- The All-Star Karate League
- World Association of Karate/Kickboxing Organization in the USA
- The OTOMOX Grand Slam Series

== World champion ==
- World Champion, International Sport Karate Association 1996, 1997
- World Champion, World Association of Karate/Kickboxing Team 1991 through 1997
- First Superlight weight fighter in Karate History to be rated Number one for all weight division
- US Open International World Champion, 1996
- Winner, Grand Champion Professional Karate Association
- Elected to Martial Arts Black Belt Hall of Fame
- Champion, North American Karate Conference
- Grand Champion of Professional Karate League
- First Superlight weight fighter in Karate history to win the overall fighting Grand Championship in a National Event
- Three time overall Men's National Fighting Champion
- Winner of the most consecutive Karate championships in the History of Sport Karate

== Accomplishments ==
- Multi NASKA World Champion
- Multi WAKO World Champion inc.
  - 1993 W.A.K.O. World Championships in Atlantic City, USA (gold) -63 kg (Semi-Contact)
- PKL National Champion
- Karate Illustrated Champion
- ISKA World Champion
- PKC World Champion
- PKA World Champion
- DOJO Champion
- SEKA Champion
- NAKC Champion
- IKC Hall of Fame
- Southern Representative of WKC in the USA
- Inducted into the Battle of Atlanta Centurion Club
- Established the All-Star Karate League (ASKL) in 1989
