= W.A.K.O. World Championships 1991 =

Eight world kickboxing championships held in 1991

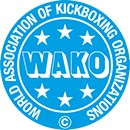
- The poster for W.A.K.O. World Championships 1991
- Promotion: W.A.K.O.
- Date: October 12 (Start); October 13, 1991 (End)
- Venue: Crystal Palace National Sports Centre
- City: (United Kingdom) London, England, UK

Event chronology
W.A.K.O. European Championships 1990	W.A.K.O. World Championships 1991	W.A.K.O. European Championships 1992

W.A.K.O. World Championships 1991 were the eight world kickboxing championships hosted by the W.A.K.O. organization. It was the third world championships to be held in London, involving amateur men and women from twenty-eight countries across the world. There were three styles on offer; Semi-Contact, Light-Contact and Musical Forms, and for the first time since Milan 1981, there would be no Full-Contact kickboxing competition at a W.A.K.O. world championships. Each country was allowed one competitor per weight division per category, although participants were allowed to participate in more than one category.

By the end of the championships the USA were the top nation, just about pushing hosts Great Britain into second by virtue of their performance in Musical Forms, with Hungary in third. There was also a little bit of history made in London with the American Christine Bannon-Rodrigues being the first person to win three golds at a single championships, winning gold medals in Semi-Contact and Musical Forms (x2). The event was held in London over two days at the Crystal Palace National Sports Centre in London, England, UK, starting on Saturday 12 October and finishing on Sunday 13 October 1991.

== Semi-Contact ==
Semi-Contact is a form of kickboxing in which fights were won by points given due to technique, skill and speed, with physical force limited - more information on Semi-Contact can be found on the W.A.K.O. website, although the rules will have changed since 1991. The men had seven weight classes, starting at 57 kg/125.4 lbs and ending at over 84 kg/+184.8 lbs, while the women's competition had three weight classes beginning at 50 kg/110 lbs and ending at 60 kg/132 lbs. The most notable winner was Christine Bannon-Rodrigues who would also win two more golds in Musical Forms. By the end of the championships the hosts Great Britain were the strongest nation in Semi-Contact, winning three golds, three silvers and three bronzes across the male and female competitions.

=== Men's Semi-Contact Kickboxing Medals Table ===
Event	Gold	Silver	Bronze
-57 kg	Cucci (Italy)	Preece (United Kingdom)	Marc Beaudry (Canada); Piotr Siegoczynski (Poland)
-63 kg	Martin Kilgus (Germany)	Joe Tierney (United Kingdom)	Giersthoven (Netherlands); Peter Gilpin (Canada)
-69 kg	Pedro Xavier (United States)	Yves Lalonde (Canada)	Thomas Pfaffl (Germany); Billy Bryce (United Kingdom)
-74 kg	Sergio Portaro (Italy)	Christopher Rappold (United States)	Lajos Hugyetz (Hungary); Stefan Martin (Switzerland)
-79 kg	Peter Edwards (United Kingdom)	Delaporte (France)	Jim Flood (Canada); Richard Barefield (United States)
-84 kg	Alfie Lewis (United Kingdom)	Bettini (United Kingdom)	Emanuel Bettencourt (Cape Verde); Zoltan Szucs (Hungary)
+84 kg	Andrew Boyce (United Kingdom)	Cruz (Brazil)	Barnabas Katona (Hungary); Valentini (Italy)

=== Women's Semi-Contact Kickboxing Medals Table ===
Event	Gold	Silver	Bronze
-50 kg	Karin Schiller (Germany)	Szepessi (Hungary)	Amanda Quansah (United Kingdom); Derita (Canada)
-55 kg	Christine Bannon-Rodrigues (United States)	Hugyetz (Hungary)	Deyta (Turkey); Manon Desrochers (Canada)
-60 kg	Carla Ribeiro (Brazil)	Stiegler (Germany)	Mirai (Turkey); Lawson (United Kingdom)

== Light-Contact ==
More physical than Semi-Contact but less so than Full-Contact, points were awarded and fights won on the basis of speed and technique over power, and it was seen as a transition stage for fighters who were considering a move from Semi to Full-Contact. More information on Light-Contact rules can be found of the W.A.K.O. website, although be aware that the rules may have changed since 1991. For the first time ever at a W.A.K.O. world championships, both men and women were allowed to take part in Light-Contact, with the men having seven weight classes, starting at 57 kg/125.4 lbs and ending at over 84 kg/+184.8 lbs and the women's having four weight classes beginning at 50 kg/110 lbs and ending at over 60 kg/+132 lbs. The most notable medallist was Jeff Roufus who although he only gained a bronze would later having future success as a multiple pro world champion. By the end of the event, hosts Great Britain were the strongest country in Light-Contact winning four golds, one silver and two bronze medals.

=== Men's Light-Contact Kickboxing Medals Table ===
Event	Gold	Silver	Bronze
-57 kg	Lantos (Hungary)	Jakob Jurgen (Germany)	Shawn Wheat (United States); Ind (United Kingdom)
-63 kg	Ivanov (Commonwealth of Independent States)	Charles Barron (United States)	Alan Johnson (Republic of Ireland); Peter Gilpin (Canada)
-69 kg	Evelyn Dwyer (United Kingdom)	David Wilson (United States)	Carvalho (Portugal); Drazdynski (Poland)
-74 kg	Lajos Hugyetz (Hungary)	Michael Wübke (Germany)	Alberto Montrond (United States); Dushkin (Commonwealth of Independent States)
-79 kg	George McKenzie (United Kingdom)	Jim Flood (Canada)	Bernd Reichenbach (Germany); Csaszar (Hungary)
-84 kg	Wilkinson (United Kingdom)	Zoltan Szucs (Hungary)	Donet (France); Adamson (Nigeria)
+84 kg	Barnabas Katona (Hungary)	Morozow (Commonwealth of Independent States)	Alan Reid (United Kingdom); Jeff Roufus (United States)

=== Women's Light-Contact Kickboxing Medals Table ===
Event	Gold	Silver	Bronze
-50 kg	K. Leclerc (France)	Szepessi (Hungary)	Christine Damm (Germany); Neglia (Italy)
-55 kg	Stefania Proietti (Italy)	A. Joswig (United Kingdom)	Kathy Carchia (United States); Carson (Nigeria)
-60 kg	Agnieszka Rylik (Poland)	Gabriella Bady (Hungary)	Justina Hall (United States); Gilpin (Canada)
+60 kg	Bailey (United Kingdom)	Lisa Crosby (United States)	Sasse (Germany); Tunde Kocsis (Hungary)

== Forms ==
Musical Forms is a non-physical competition which sees the contestants fighting against imaginary foes using Martial Arts techniques - more information can be accessed on the W.A.K.O. website, although be aware that the rules may have changed since 1991. For the first time ever, women were officially recognised in Musical Forms at a world championships, with the men having four styles and the women three. An explanation of the various styles is provided below:

- Hard Styles – coming from Karate and Taekwondo.
- Soft Styles – coming from Kung Fu and Wu-Sha.
- Hard Styles with Weapons – using weapons such as Kama, Sai, Tonfa, Nunchaku, Bo, Katana.
- Soft Styles with Weapons - Naginata, Nunchaku, Tai Chi Chuan Sword, Whip Chain.

Women were also allowed to use weapons but it was one separate category. The most notable winner was Christine Bannon-Rodrigues who claimed two gold medals in Soft Styles and Weapons to add to the gold she won in Semi-Contact to make history as the first person to win three golds at a single W.A.K.O. championships. The strongest nation in Musical Forms was the USA with five golds and two silver medals.

=== Men's Musical Forms Medals Table ===
Event	Gold	Silver	Bronze
Soft Styles	Benjamin Jugwels (Netherlands)	Richard Brandon (United States)	Sforza (Italy)
Hard Styles	Jean Frenette (Canada)	David Collins (United States)	Werner Stark (Germany); Lino Guarnaccia (Italy)
Hard Styles with Weapons	Tony Orr (United States)	Jean Frenette (Canada)	Baba-Milis (Republic of Ireland); Ghorbani (Morocco)
Soft Styles with Weapons	Richard Brandon (United States)	Sylvester Engelhart (Netherlands)	Mario Eismann (Germany); Sporka (United States)

=== Women's Musical Forms Medals Table ===
Event	Gold	Silver	Bronze
Hard Styles	Patricia Lamoureux (Canada)	Ann Gregory (United States)	Caroline Suter (Switzerland); Alo (Italy)
Soft Styles	Christine Bannon-Rodrigues (United States)	Sherida Pattiwaellapia (Netherlands)	Austin (United Kingdom); Anzhenko (Commonwealth of Independent States)
Weapons	Christine Bannon-Rodrigues (United States)	Manon Desrochers (Canada)	Anzhenko (Commonwealth of Independent States); Austin (United Kingdom)

== Overall Medals Standing (Top 5) ==
Ranking	Country	Gold (gold)	Silver (silver)	Bronze (bronze)
1	(United States) USA	7	6	6
2	(United Kingdom) Great Britain	7	4	7
3	Hungary	3	5	5
4	Italy	3	1	4
5	Canada	2	4	6

== See also ==
- List of WAKO Amateur World Championships
- List of WAKO Amateur European Championships
