= Michael Kuhr =

German kickboxer

Michael Kuhr (born 26 February 1962) is a German former professional kickboxer. Since retiring, he has worked as a security specialist.

== Biography ==
Michael was born to Wolfgang Kuhr and Traute Nitschke in Berlin in 1962. He worked for the German postal service from 1978 to 1995, before resigning for health reasons. He now runs a successful security company in Berlin, and regularly aids in police investigations. In 2001 he worked with the Landeskriminalamt Berlin as part of the special unit "Besondere Aufbauorganisation (BAO) Türsteher", established to help combat organized crime.

Kuhr began kickboxing in 1974. After winning the Vice World Championship in 1979 he began to compete regularly in amateur competition, becoming ten times German champion, four times European Champion and 1985 World Champion [World Association of Kickboxing Organizations|WAKO]. After moving into the professional circuit in 1990 he became the first German professional kickboxing champion. Between 1990 and 1994 he was champion of the world associations WAKO-PRO, PKO, ISKA and IKBF. In 1994 he retired for health reasons.

Michael Kuhr and his security team have regularly appeared on television in news reports and documentaries, and have aided police in a number of high profile criminal investigations, including the 2010 armed robbery of the Hotel Grand Hyatt during the European Poker Tour. In 2012 German police intercepted intelligence that local organised crime figures had attempted to have Kuhr assassinated.

== Kickboxing successes ==
=== Amateur ===
- 10 × German amateur kickboxing champion
- European champion: 1980, 1981, 1983, 1986
- Vice World Champion: 1979, 1983
- World Champion: 1985 (WAKO)

=== Professional ===
- 1990: the first German professional kickboxing champion under 60 kg
- 1990–1994: World champion as a professional kickboxer in the world Associations WAKO-PRO, PKO, ISKA, IKBF
