= List of Renegade episodes =

This is a list of episodes for the TV series Renegade. During the course of the series, 110 episodes of Renegade aired over five seasons.

== Series overview ==
Season	Episodes	Originally released	
Season	Episodes	First released	Last released
1	22	September 19, 1992	May 15, 1993
2	22	September 18, 1993	May 7, 1994
3	22	September 10, 1994	May 13, 1995
4	22	September 11, 1995	April 29, 1996
5	22	September 13, 1996	April 4, 1997

== Episodes ==
=== Season 1 (1992–93) ===
No. overall	No. in season	Title	Directed by	Written by	Original release date	Prod. code
1	1	"Renegade" "Pilot"	Ralph Hemecker	Stephen J. Cannell	September 19, 1992	46101
Series pilot: Framed for double homicide, including that of his fiancé Valerie Prentiss (Deprise Brescia), police officer Reno Raines goes on the run. But the man responsible for Reno's framing, Dutch Dixon, hires bounty hunter Bobby Sixkiller and his stepsister Cheyenne to bring him in.
2	2	"Hunting Accident"	BJ Davis	Stephen J. Cannell	September 26, 1992	46108
Reno rescues a man (Pete Koch) from drowning, only to learn that he is the town bully. When Reno tries to put a stop to his bullying, he reports Reno to the police, putting Dutch Dixon on his trail.
3	3	"Final Judgment"	Ralph Hemecker	Brian Herskowitz	October 3, 1992	46105
Reno tries to prevent a judge from being murdered by a killer seeking revenge.
4	4	"La Mala Sombra"	Adam Winkler	Brad Markowitz	October 10, 1992	46104
Reno seeks the reputed leader of a Latin American death squad.
5	5	"Mother Courage"	BJ Davis	Edward Tivnan	October 17, 1992	46103
Reno uncovers a crack network while investigating the death of a motorcycle mechanic.
6	6	"Second Chance"	R. Marvin	Kerry Lenhart & John J. Sakmar & Edward Tivnan	October 24, 1992	46107
Reno discovers that a racketeer he is tracking is also wanted by a crime boss.
7	7	"Eye of the Storm"	David Schmoeller	John Lansing & Bruce Cervi	October 31, 1992	46111
Reno takes refuge in a tavern during a dust storm, but winds up as a hostage to convicts who made a jailbreak.
8	8	"Payback"	Ralph Hemecker	John Lansing & Bruce Cervi	November 7, 1992	46115
Reno goes undercover on a ranch to avenge the death of an informant.
9	9	"The Talisman"	Mike Marvin	Karen Harris	November 14, 1992	46119
Reno crosses paths with a teenage girl when both are in pursuit of a wanted fugitive (Trevor Goddard).
10	10	"Partners"	James R. Bagdonas	Gordon Dawson	November 21, 1992	46117
When Reno's mentor on the police force is killed he decides to investigate. He suspects that a Mexican drug lord the man was investigating is responsible. So Reno and Bobby head to Mexico to get him but learns something unexpected.
11	11	"Lyon's Roar"	Anton Marius	Morgan Gendel	January 4, 1993	46114
Reno sets out to bring in Earl Lyons, a former comrade from Reno's Army Ranger days, who now is addicted to morphine and has gone insane, living in the wilderness. Reno must stop Lyons before either the trigger-happy authorities, or drug runners whom Lyons double-crossed, get to him first.
12	12	"Val's Song"	Adam Winkler	Stephen J. Cannell	January 11, 1993	46116
Reno's comatose fiancée is finally taken off life support, giving crooked cop Dixon an opportunity to bait Reno out into the open.
13	13	"Give and Take"	R. Marvin	Michael Pavone & Dave Alan Johnson	January 18, 1993	46109
After he is framed and falsely arrested for the murder of a woman he had earlier helped, Reno must convince a small-town sheriff (Casey Sander) that he is innocent – and that the real culprit is a serial killer. Atkins: William Anton.
14	14	"Samurai"	Terrence O'Hara	Shel Willens	January 25, 1993	46118
Reno has to rescue a kidnapped daughter of a Japanese businessman and aided by a former Yakuza member.
15	15	"The Two Renos"	Adam Winkler	Edward Tivnan	February 1, 1993	46110
While Dutch is out of town, some corrupt cops who work for him find a convict who looks like Reno. They turn him loose and orders him to commit crimes and claim he's Reno. When Reno learns of this, he and Cheyenne go under the guise of a couple to find him.
16	16	"Billy"	R. Marvin	Nick Corea	February 8, 1993	46113
While chasing a criminal motorcycle gang, Reno is assisted by a roving bank robber, Billy.
17	17	"Headcase"	R. Marvin	Nick Corea	February 15, 1993	46102
An escaped psychotic convict gets revenge on Reno and Bobby for putting him behind bars.
18	18	"The Hot Tip"	James Bagdonas	Larry Mollin	February 22, 1993	46123
Reno rescues a beautiful actress from a fortified Mexican estate.
19	19	"Moody River"	A. Winkler	Larry Mollin	April 26, 1993	46124
Reno helps a group of ex-cons fight corrupt officials in a small town.
20	20	"Vanished"	Terrence O'Hara	Robert Hamner	May 3, 1993	46122
The daughter of Reno's loyal long-time friend Assistant D. A. Wells begins going on a downhill spiral, entering a life of drug addiction. Upon further investigation, Reno and Cheyenne discover there is much more to this family tragedy than originally thought. They soon uncover a rather elaborate scheme involving black market drugs, a touring rock band, and a corrupt band manager who plans to use the girl to leverage Wells into dropping the impending case against her brother, a notorious drug dealer.
21	21	"Fighting Cage, Part 1"	Ralph Hemecker	Stephen J. Cannell	May 10, 1993	46120
Reno learns his brother Mitch, thought to be dead in the Vietnam War, is still alive and now a cage fighter, he goes undercover as a cage fighter to find him.
22	22	"Fighting Cage, Part 2"	R. Marvin	Nick Corea	May 17, 1993	46121
Reno gets help from his brother, Bobby, Cheyenne, and others, to put an end to the ruthless cage fighting organization.

=== Season 2 (1993–94) ===
No. overall	No. in season	Title	Directed by	Written by	Original release date	Prod. code
23	1	"The Hound"	Michael Levine	Bill Nuss	September 13, 1993	46202
Bobby and Reno’s next bounty involves a man named Hound Adams (Geoffrey Blake), the brother of the man who was sent by Dixon sent to kill him. Hound claims to have evidence that not only clears Reno but also incriminates Dixon. But he won't give it unless Reno kills Dixon.
24	2	"The Champ"	Bruce Kessler	Richard C. Okie	September 20, 1993	46203
When a convicted boxing legend named Marvin (Tom Lister Jr.) escapes, Reno gives chase. But Reno soon learns that things are not what they seem.
25	3	"White Picket Fences"	Bruce Kessler	Charles Grant Craig	September 27, 1993	46208
Reno must protect an innocent young woman when she witnesses a murder in the big city from his latest bounty, who tracks her to a small rural village in order to prevent her from testifying.
26	4	"Dead End and Easy Money"	Michael Preece	Stephen J. Cannell	October 4, 1993	46205
Reno, Bobby and Cheyenne join forces with a rival bounty hunter, Denise "Dead End" Dennison (Cyndi Pass), to capture a criminal gang.
27	5	"No Good Deed"	Russell Solberg	Richard C. Okie	October 11, 1993	46207
When Bobby is arrested for refusing to reveal Reno's true identity to a judge, Reno frees him by agreeing to help the district attorney capture merciless killer Randy Dupree.
28	6	"The Rabbit and the Fox"	Terrence O'Hara	Bill Nuss	October 18, 1993	46206
Cheyenne is hired to track down mob wife and accused murderer, Lisa Bendetti (Paula Trickey), who has become a national cult figure. At first Bobby opposes, but when he realizes the potential publicity, he approves. Thus Reno has to subdue the captured Lisa, whom he ends up falling for – so Reno tries to clear Lisa of the charges against her. Valerie Prentiss: Deprise Brescia.
29	7	"Endless Summer"	Gary Winter	Robin Jill Burger	October 25, 1993	46209
Reno gets involved with a group of daring surfers who risk their lives stealing the profits of a sadistic drug-smuggling cartel.
30	8	"Bonnie and Claire"	Michael Levine	Richard C. Okie	November 1, 1993	46211
Reno is called in to transport a con artist named Bonnie (Mary Ellen Stuart) to trial. She soon proves to be big trouble, but when Reno agrees to take Bonnie back to see her daughter before going to jail, Bonnie's partner and sister Claire (Claire Yarlett) frees her from Reno. So Reno, Bobby and Chey have to pursue them.
31	9	"Wheel Man"	Ralph Hemecker	Bill Nuss & Richard C. Okie	November 8, 1993	46216
Reno poses as a daring race car driver to capture a bank robber who uses professional drivers as his accomplices. Lance: Walt Goggins
32	10	"Windy City Blues"	Terrence O'Hara	Bill Nuss & Richard C. Okie	November 15, 1993	46217
When Reno learns a criminal that his father (Charles Napier) put away is on the loose, he returns to Chicago to give his estranged father a hand. But things get worse when Dutch Dixon shows up.
33	11	"Honor Bound"	Bob Bralver	Greg Strangis	November 22, 1993	46212
Reno and Bobby help Zachary Quinn (Charles Cyphers), a fellow Marine Corps officer, solve the gruesome murder of his daughter. Things take a turn when Zach and his son Brett decide to go after the daughter's killer themselves.
34	12	"Hard Rider"	Russell Solberg	Richard C. Okie	January 3, 1994	46218
Reno and Bobby are assisted by a gang of Hell's Angels bikers in rescuing a casino owner's daughter from two psychotic kidnappers.
35	13	"Charlie"	Bruce Kessler	Charles Grant Craig	January 10, 1994	46210
Reno becomes babysitter to a street wise 6-year-old girl. Meanwhile Bobby gets a line on Hound Adams.
36	14	"South of 98"	James Whitmore, Jr.	Charles Grant Craig	January 17, 1994	46204
Reno searches for a fugitive gang member in a violent African-American neighborhood.
37	15	"Hostage"	Terrence O'Hara	Robert Hamner	January 24, 1994	46214
Reno gets a lead on Hound Adams (Geoffrey Blake) and nails him at a bar, but as they're ready to leave they are taken hostage.
38	16	"Rabbit Redux"	Michael Levine	Story by : Bill Nuss; Teleplay by : Richard C. Okie	January 31, 1994	46219
Reno's romantic vacation with Lisa Bendetti (Paula Trickey) is disrupted when their mountain cabin becomes the target of a gang of vengeful drug suppliers.
39	17	"The Posse"	Lyndon Chubbuck	Nick Corea	February 7, 1994	46215
Reno, Bobby and Cheyenne protect a fugitive bank robber falsely accused of murdering a sheriff's wife.
40	18	"Once Burned, Twice Chey"	Ralph Hemecker	Richard C. Okie	February 14, 1994	46221
Influenced by her romantic attraction to a former teacher accused of murdering his wife, Cheyenne asks Reno and Bobby to help prove his innocence.
41	19	"Sheriff Reno"	Lorenzo Lamas	Nick Corea	February 21, 1994	46220
After Reno is stopped in a small town by the local sheriff and deputy, the sheriff is immediately shot and killed by two murderous brothers. So Reno must help out the jealous deputy (John Allsop) find his courage, prevent one brother from breaking the other out of jail, and prevent the town's people from lynching the sheriff's killer.
42	20	"Murderer's Row, Part 1"	Ralph Hemecker	Richard C. Okie	April 25, 1994	46222
Reno and Bobby compete against the best bounty hunters in the country when a wealthy entrepreneur offers a million dollars for the return of a microprocessor stolen by a traitorous executive.
43	21	"Murderer's Row, Part 2"	Ralph Hemecker	Richard C. Okie	May 2, 1994	46223
Reno, Bobby and Cheyenne help a fugitive woman retrieve an incriminating diary that will convict an abusive entrepreneur of his wife's murder.
44	22	"Carrick O'Quinn"	Michael Levine	Bill Nuss	May 9, 1994	46224
After blinding a judge (Cecilia Peck) in an attempt to foil a robbery, cop Carrick O'Quinn (Don Michael Paul) quits his special forces unit to become a quasi-P.I., to help people out, like those that ask for help from his priest brother (Jay Avocone). O'Quinn crosses paths with Reno because Reno knows the judge whom O'Quinn has blinded, and the two team up to solve a case. Note: Backdoor pilot attempt. (See: Renegade attempted spinoff.)

=== Season 3 (1994–95) ===
No. overall	No. in season	Title	Directed by	Written by	Original release date	Prod. code
45	1	"Dutch on the Run"	Terrence O'Hara	Bill Nuss & Richard C. Okie	September 10, 1994	46304
Reno goes after Dixon when he learns of a large reward for Dutch's arrest after Dutch's murder of his cop partner, Woodrow Bickford (Ron Johnson), turns up on video tape, not realizing it is all just an elaborate trap. Part 1 of 3.
46	2	"The Trial of Reno Raines"	Michael Levine	Stephen J. Cannell	September 17, 1994	46305
Reno is arrested and put on trial for the murder of Buzzy Burrell where only a lawyer (Nancy Everhard) can help him. Hound Adams (Geoffrey Blake) testifies for the defense but implicates Reno in Burrell's killing. With no other evidence to clear him, Reno's conviction is all but guaranteed. Part 2 of 3.
47	3	"Escape"	Ralph Hemecker	Story by : Bill Nuss; Teleplay by : Richard C. Okie	September 24, 1994	46306
Found guilty of Buzzy Burrell's murder, Reno is sent to the state penitentiary with Rocky (Lawrence Hilton-Jacobs), the con was bribed by Dutch to try to kill Reno (in "The Trial of Reno Raines") but who is now Reno's ally. Reno's only chance: to escape prison with Rocky and his gang. Part 3 of 3.
48	4	"The King and I"	James Darren	Richard C. Okie	October 1, 1994	46308
Reno gets help from a man who looks like Elvis, and Reno helps him in return.
49	5	"Black Wind"	Ralph Hemecker	Story by : Fred L. Miller; Teleplay by : Richard C. Okie	October 8, 1994	46311
Reno responds to a message from his former sensei and helps stop a deadly attacker known as the Black Wind.
50	6	"Way Down Yonder in New Orleans"	Ron Garcia	D. Victor Hawkins & Tom Nelson	October 15, 1994	46307
Reno is cursed with bad luck while hunting a fugitive in New Orleans, and Bobby is plagued with bad luck while trying to get to Reno.
51	7	"Rustlers' Rodeo"	Russell Solberg	Donald Marcus	October 22, 1994	46310
Reno, Bobby, and Cheyenne investigate a rodeo when a friend needs help finding his stolen prize bull.
52	8	"Muscle Beach"	Terence O'Hara	D. Victor Hawkins & Tom Nelson	October 29, 1994	46314
Reno and Cheyenne investigate illegal steroids at a gym so Bobby can bring down the untouchable drug kingpin behind it all.
53	9	"The Late Shift"	Lee H. Katzin	Bill Nuss	November 5, 1994	46315
While Reno hunts for his latest bounty, he finds out that a late night radio talk show host is telling her listeners about his trial.
54	10	"Thrill Kill"	Terence O'Hara	Ronald W. Taylor	November 12, 1994	46313
A competitor of Bobby's turns bounty hunting into a thrill-kill sport when he captures Reno.
55	11	"Teen Angel"	Bruce Kessler	Nicholas J. Corea	November 19, 1994	46302
Bobby is hired by a rich socialite to find her daughter (Emma Caulfield), so Reno goes to track her down. But on the way, Reno finds out that the daughter is a prostitute, prompting Reno to look up a retired call-girl (Janet Gunn) to help him bust the pimp (Mark Lindsay Chapman).
56	12	"Den of Thieves"	Ralph Hemecker	Donald Marcus	December 30, 1994	46319
An internal affairs officer that Reno was partners with when he was a cop feels her life is being threatened. The culprit is a former dirty police officer that she brought to justice, turned motorcycle gangster kingpin. After he makes several attempts on her life, she contacts Reno to assist. Reno assumes the identity of the gangster after he dies in a tragic accident, in order to more deeply investigate and expose the ongoing organized crime operation.
57	13	"Rancho Escondido"	Michael Vejar	B.J. Nelson	January 7, 1995	46309
Hot on the trail of a corrupt banker that embezzled millions of dollars, Reno and Bobby trace the bounty to a remote resort. However, this is no ordinary tourist paradise, as it serves as a front for a clinic that offers new identities to wealthy fugitives via expensive and risky plastic surgery operations.
58	14	"Cop for a Day"	Russell Solberg	Story by : Bill Nuss; Teleplay by : Richard C. Okie & Donald Marcus	January 14, 1995	46320
Bobby gets help from Reno when he tries to bring in an unstable bounty who passes himself off as a sheriff.
59	15	"Stalker's Moon"	Lorenzo Lamas	Richard C. Okie	January 21, 1995	46318
A serial killer is stalking Santa Barbara, and Bobby is determined to bring him in, but when Bobby disappears Chey takes Reno to track Bobby down, little knowing that Bobby is in the hands of the killer.
60	16	"Repo Raines"	Michael Levine	Scott Smith Miller	January 28, 1995	46316
Bobby has Reno go undercover as a repo man to find a killer.
61	17	"Ace in the Hole"	Perry Husman	Nicholas J. Corea	February 4, 1995	46301
When Reno accidentally kills a real estate agent while hunting for his latest bounty, a crazed gunman by the name of 'Preacher' Lomax, he sets out protect the man's wife and son from Lomax who had illegal business dealings with the agent.
62	18	"Living Legend"	Terrence O'Hara	Story by : Michael Levine; Teleplay by : Richard C. Okie	February 11, 1995	46317
Reno is in trouble when Bobby's teacher and mentor, a legendary bounty hunter, targets Reno as his next prey.
63	19	"Family Ties"	Lorenzo Lamas	Story by : Marvin Herbert; Teleplay by : Marvin Herbert & Bill Nuss	February 18, 1995	46312
Reno's patience is tested when he must protect a wealthy socialite who witnessed a murder but doesn't believe that she is the killer's next intended victim.
64	20	"Broken on the Wheel of Love"	Terence O'Hara	Donald Marcus	April 29, 1995	46321
Reno's bounty leads him to a famous country singer who he falls in love with while providing security.
65	21	"Split Decision"	Russell Solberg	Richard C. Okie	May 6, 1995	46323
Bobby and Reno go their separate ways after Cheyenne gets injured while pursuing a bounty. Dutch Dixon gets involved in trying to persuade Bobby to join his side and finally give up Reno.
66	22	"Hitman"	Bill Nuss	Bill Nuss	May 13, 1995	46322
A dying hitman wants Reno to take over his business after he dies.

=== Season 4 (1995–96) ===
No. overall	No. in season	Title	Directed by	Written by	Original release date	Prod. code
67	1	"Sawed-Off Shotgun Wedding"	Terrence O'Hara	Richard C. Okie	September 11, 1995	46402
A corrupt diplomat (Diego Wallraff) is running a drug smuggling operation. Reno gets involved, trying to bring him in, and meets another diplomat (Jacqueline Obradors) who might be able to solve all his problems. Meanwhile, Dutch Dixon eliminates the competition (Robert Pine) and is promoted to federal marshal, meaning he can now use federal resources to try and nab Reno. Jack Hendricks: Kent McCord.
68	2	"Honeymoon in Mexico"	Charles Siebert	Bill Nuss	September 18, 1995	46404
Vacation time is put on hold when Reno and Bobby are hired by a young woman (Jessica Cushman) to find her husband, unaware of her true intentions.
69	3	"The Ballad of D.B. Cooper"	Gary Winter	Richard C. Okie	September 25, 1995	46405
Following a tip, Reno and Bobby head to a small town believed to be the hiding place of D. B. Cooper, but the townspeople seem determined to hide something from them. They must also contend with a more ruthless and sadistic fellow bounty hunter (Sam Jones). Charlie Douglas: Max Gail. Tina Douglas: Elisa Donovan.
70	4	"Most Wanted"	Ron Satlof	Donald Marcus	October 2, 1995	46406
Bobby falls for a woman he meets while chasing a bounty, but Reno is suspicious of who she really is.
71	5	"Liar's Poker"	Jeff Woolnough	Raymond Hartung	October 9, 1995	46410
When Reno and Bobby go after a prison escapee, Reno believes she's innocent which doesn't settle too well with Bobby.
72	6	"Dead Heat"	Terrence O'Hara	Donald Marcus	October 23, 1995	46403
Reno investigates the mysterious death of a healthy racehorse at a widow's ranch in the hopes of preventing another death.
73	7	"An Uncle in the Business"	Michael Levine	James Kramer	October 30, 1995	46409
Reno steps back into his role as guardian when he visits Lisa (Courtney Peldon) to investigate why someone broke into her home.
74	8	"Offshore Thunder"	Russell Solberg	Tony Blake & Paul Jackson	November 6, 1995	46413
Reno reconnects with Val's sister Debbie (Angie Harmon) when he gives her a hand as a mechanic to investigate the death of a race boat driver.
75	9	"Studs"	Carl Weathers	Donald Marcus	November 13, 1995	46412
When an old friend of Bobby's becomes the latest victim of an escort agency which blackmails its clients, Reno goes undercover as a male escort to help her out.
76	10	"Another Place and Time"	Corey Michael Eubanks	Robin Jill Bernheim	November 20, 1995	46416
Reno and Cheyenne go undercover as newlyweds to catch a family mobster, wanted for murder, and in the process they express their feelings for each other. Sugar Ray Leonard guest stars.
77	11	"Sins of the Father"	Terrence O'Hara	Stephen J. Cannell	November 27, 1995	46419
When Dutch Dixon's son Donny is released from prison, Reno discovers Donny is working with Dutch's ex-partner with a goal of bringing Dutch down.
78	12	"No Place Like Home"	Ron Garcia	Janet Greek	January 1, 1996	46408
Bobby, Chey and Reno take on the job of escorting a paroled rapist (who claims his innocence) to his new home on a California town that does not want him. Indeed, when they arrive in town, it does not look like the convict (Christopher Rich) will last long, so Reno stays on, to protect the convict from the town and his parole officer (Holly Gagnier), and the town from the convict if he really is a rapist.
79	13	"Baby Makes Three"	Russell Solberg	Robin Jill Bernheim	January 8, 1996	46418
Reno and Bobby track down the mother of a baby who was left on the office doorstep.
80	14	"Hound Downtown"	Ron Satlof	Donald Marcus	January 15, 1996	46420
Reno and Bobby head to New York City to find Hound Adams.
81	15	"Stationary Target"	Don Michael Paul	Richard C. Okie	January 22, 1996	46411
A motorcycle crash leaves Reno with amnesia; Bobby searches for him and so does Dutch Dixon.
82	16	"Rio Reno"	Perry Husman	Robin Jill Bernheim	January 29, 1996	46421
While chasing a bounty, Reno winds up in an old west town where he has a score to settle with Swede Mason.
83	17	"Paradise Lost"	Jeff Woolnough	W. Reed Moran	February 5, 1996	46417
Reno takes refuge from a police chase at a commune, but in reality is a front for an anarachist group. He finds himself under suspecion of planting a bomb in a local city building.
84	18	"Love Hurts"	Russell Solberg	Donald Marcus	February 12, 1996	46422
Bobby deals with one dangerous situation after another when his mother and cousin show up unexpectedly.
85	19	"Hard Evidence"	Lorenzo Lamas	Robin Jill Bernheim	February 19, 1996	46423
Peter Flood shows pictures of what he believes are UFOs to Bobby and Reno, who suspect a government cover-up and agree to investigate.
86	20	"The Dollhouse"	Tawnia Cannell McKiernan	Robin Jill Bernheim	April 15, 1996	46425
Reno is kidnapped by a woman named Jody Whitley (Jamie Rose) and her brother (Michael Cudlitz), who put Bobby in the hospital, and who want to force Reno to marry their sister (Heather Fairfield). With Bobby out of the way, only Nathan Wayne (L.Q. Jones) and Twink (Sunday Theodore) can save Reno.
87	21	"Hog Calls"	Branscombe Richmond	Donald Marcus	April 22, 1996	46424
Reno searches Arizona for the lawyer who has the tapes proving his innocence and manages to land a job as her bodyguard.
88	22	"The Road Not Taken"	Richard C. Okie	Story by : Michael Levine; Teleplay by : Richard C. Okie	April 29, 1996	46414
After capturing bounty Henry Travis (Johnny Cash), Reno is thrown in jail as well, prompting Reno to confide to Travis that he "wish he'd taken that bullet" instead of his fiancé, Val (Deprise Brescia). He promptly gets his wish, and Reno is treated to a view of the world in which he has been dead for 4 years.

=== Season 5 (1996–97) ===
In the fifth and final season of Renegade, the show aired exclusively on the USA Network. The series' regular timeslot was Friday night. Kathleen Kinmont's character, Cheyenne Phillips, was dropped from the show and did not appear in the final season, except for in a flashback during episode 19 Bounty Hunter of the Year. In her place a new recurring character of Sandy Carruthers was introduced, played by Sandra Ferguson.

No. overall	No. in season	Title	Directed by	Written by	Original release date	Prod. code
89	1	"No Balls and Two Strikes"	Jeff Woolnough	Richard C. Okie	September 13, 1996	46507
A murderer, Lucious Carabello, who Bobby apprehended and put in prison a few years back is released with the aid of U.S. Marshal 'Dutch' Dixon. In exchange, Lucious is expected to help Dutch in flushing out Reno by using Bobby as bait. Meanwhile, Sixkiller Enterprises has a new employee, Sandy Carruthers (Sandra Ferguson), who has recently passed Bobby's bounty hunting video course and comes looking to him for a job. She wants to learn from the best. Even though she and Bobby get off to a rocky start, they eventually become friendly toward one another.
90	2	"Self Defense"	Ron Satlof	Janet Greek	September 20, 1996	46504
Reno goes after bounty Teddy Ray Thompson (Linda Blair), who accidentally stabbed her cop husband during a situation of domestic abuse. But when Reno discovers the truth, he finds a kindred spirit in Teddy Ray, and helps her fend off her husband's partner (Joe Cortese) who is determined to get his revenge.
91	3	"Mr. Success"	Jeff Woolnough	Raymond Hartung	September 27, 1996	46510
Reno and Bobby are tricked into seeking a bone-marrow donor. When they find him, he is shot dead. Investigating a series of clues, the bounty hunters are lead down a deadly path of blackmail and murder.
92	4	"Five Minutes to Midnight"	Ron Satlof	Richard C. Okie	October 4, 1996	46509
Bobby races against the clock to find out whether one of his former bounties (Scott Valentine), a convicted rapist on death row, is truly guilty before the man is put to death.
93	5	"God's Mistake"	Thomas Neuwirth	Ethlie Ann Vare	October 18, 1996	46508
Reno tracks a rock star who fakes his own disappearance and kidnapping to get out of his record deal.
94	6	"Ghost Story"	Russell Solberg	Fred L. Miller	October 25, 1996	46511
Following a near-death experience, Reno is contacted by the spirit of a murdered man (Ken Olandt) who wants the Renegade to help clear his name and punish the man responsible for his death
95	7	"The Milk Carton Kid"	Charles Siebert	Janet Greek	November 1, 1996	46506
A girl approaches Sandy and shows her a milk carton with a picture of a girl on it which she says is her. She thinks the people whom she thinks are her parents kidnapped her. She and Reno do some checking around. And it isn't long before the Feds go to see Bobby and tell him to back off. Thing is he does not know what they are talking about. Later a mobster shows up looking for a guy who is the father of the girl.
96	8	"High Rollers"	Russell Solberg	Raymond Hartung	November 8, 1996	46505
The stakes are high when Reno infiltrates a gang of bandits famous for robbing high rollers as they are leaving Reno, Nevada.
97	9	"For Better, for Worse"	Charles Siebert	Ethlie Ann Vare	November 15, 1996	46512
It is Dutch Dixon's silver wedding anniversary and his wife Melissa decides to present an opportunity to Bobby and Reno to finally nail her husband and bring him to justice; Dutch catches wise to her plans and forces her to set a trap for Reno.
98	10	"The Pipeline"	Ron Satlof	Raymond Hartung	November 22, 1996	46513
After thwarting an armored truck robbery, Reno runs into a fugitive who was thought to be dead, and he and Bobby learn about an organization that gives criminals a new identity; Reno and Bobby come up with a plan to destroy it.
99	11	"Ransom"	John Paragon	Richard C. Okie	December 6, 1996	46515
Bobby is forced to use some of his own savings when an incompetent bounty hunter is held for ransom by the bank robber he was trying to capture; the bounty hunter is a former colleague trying to catch a criminal threatening to use a bomb.
100	12	"Father's Day"	Ron Satlof	Julie G. Beers	December 13, 1996	46501
Reno is reunited with his former girlfriend, and learns that he may be the father of her fourteen-year-old son.
101	13	"Hard Rain"	Tawnia McKiernan	Raymond Hartung	January 13, 1997	46518
Reno may finally have his hands on the evidence he will need to finally bring Dutch down and expose him, which is a videotape that shows the corrupt marshal shooting his own wife; Dutch is forced to go to a psychologist experienced in bereavement. Note: Special Monday airing.
102	14	"Top Ten with a Bullet"	Jeff Woolnough	Ethlie Ann Vare	January 20, 1997	46503
Reno tries to arrange for the peaceful surrender of a counterculture fugitive charged with murdering a professor during the 1960's. Note: Special Monday airing.
103	15	"SWM Seeks VCTM"	Stephen L. Posey	Story by : Deborah J. Ezer; Teleplay by : Ethlie Ann Vare	January 27, 1997	46514
Sandy goes undercover to locate a love-sick psycho preying on women with short blonde hair and becomes a captive of the killer. Note: Special Monday airing.
104	16	"Knockout"	Terry J. Edwards	William Bigelow	February 7, 1997	46516
A female action hero quits the movie business to search for her missing brother. To her shock, he has set up a drug lab and is formulating drugs for the mafia. Reno assists her in getting her brother clean and busting the drug dealers.
105	17	"Sex, Lies and Activewear"	Lorenzo Lamas	Ethlie Ann Vare	February 28, 1997	46520
Bobby and his fitness trainer Lake Bradshaw (Shauna Sand) enter the lingerie business. During a photo shoot, Ms. Bradshaw and her model friends run into thieves who are looting houses and get kidnapped. They must overcome their kidnappers with help from the bounty hunters.
106	18	"Blood Hunt"	Bruce Kessler	Richard Gilbert Hill	March 7, 1997	46502
A series of local murders and other strange occurrences are believed to be caused by a vampire. Although they are skeptical of it being a supernatural being, Reno and Bobby still must solve the murders and protect the local population.
107	19	"Bounty Hunter of the Year"	Ron Satlof	Richard C. Okie & Julie G. Beers	March 14, 1997	46519
Bobby, Sandy and Reno attempt to determine the best material for Bobby to use in his acceptance speech for winning bounty hunter of the year. The episode contains many flashbacks to various bounties over the shows five seasons.
108	20	"Born Under a Bad Sign"	Ron Satlof	Raymond Hartung	March 21, 1997	46521
Reno arrests a bounty with a bad luck streak. The bad luck falls on Reno when he and his bounty get locked up. While they're in prison, the guards are staging death fights between inmates. They must escape and put an end to the fight ring.
109	21	"The Maltese Indian"	Perry Husman	Robert Earll	March 28, 1997	46523
Bobby, Sandy and Reno stake out the ex-girlfriend and daughter (Kathrin Nicholson, Brittany Alyse Smith) of a deadly escaped convict and bank robber (Todd Tesen), whose hidden stash of gold may net Sixkiller Enterprises a $150,000 reward, and it is not long before Reno ingratiates himself with both the ex-girlfriend and the daughter.
110	22	"The Bad Seed"	Branscombe Richmond	Richard C. Okie	April 4, 1997	46522
While Dutch makes one last offer to Reno (through Bobby) – leave the country and receive $500,000 from Dutch to stay quiet – Donnie Dixon (Steven Flynn) escapes prison to seek revenge on his mother's killer (who Donnie thinks is Reno) after the apparition of his mother (Gloria Loring) visits him in prison. Meanwhile, Dutch's boss Jack Hendricks (Kent McCord) tries to sort this all out. In the end, Dutch shoots Hendricks and escapes, thus the tables are finally turned on Dutch as he becomes the hunted and Reno (the hunted) becomes the hunter his name is cleared, leaving the end of the story ambiguous.
