= Batman Returns =

1992 superhero film directed by Tim Burton

- Theatrical release poster by John Alvin
- Directed by: Tim Burton
- Screenplay by: Daniel Waters
- Story by: Daniel Waters; Sam Hamm
- Based on: Batman characters created by; Bob Kane; Bill Finger (Note: Although Bob Kane received sole credit for Batman and his associated characters in Batman Returns, it was established in 2015 that writer Bill Finger was jointly involved in the creation of Batman as well as The Penguin and Catwoman, among others. He received equal credit to Kane in future adaptations of the Batman comic books.); and published by DC Comics
- Produced by: Denise Di Novi; Tim Burton
- Starring: Michael Keaton; Danny DeVito; Michelle Pfeiffer; Christopher Walken; Michael Gough; Pat Hingle; Michael Murphy
- Cinematography: Stefan Czapsky
- Edited by: Chris Lebenzon
- Music by: Danny Elfman
- Production companies: Warner Bros.; PolyGram Pictures
- Distributed by: Warner Bros.
- Release dates: June 16, 1992 (Hollywood, California); June 19, 1992 (United States)
- Running time: 126 minutes
- Country: United States
- Language: English
- Budget: $50–80 million
- Box office: $266.8 million

Batman Returns is a 1992 American superhero film directed by Tim Burton and written by Daniel Waters. Based on the DC Comics character Batman, it is the sequel to Batman (1989), also directed by Burton, and the second film in the Batman film series (1989–1997). The cast includes Michael Keaton, Danny DeVito, Michelle Pfeiffer, Christopher Walken, Michael Gough, Pat Hingle, and Michael Murphy. Set during Christmas in Gotham City, the film follows Batman (Keaton) as he confronts corrupt businessman Max Shreck (Walken) and deformed crime boss Oswald Cobblepot / the Penguin (DeVito), whose bid for power threatens the city. Their schemes are further complicated by Shreck's former secretary Selina Kyle (Pfeiffer), who seeks revenge against him as Catwoman.

Burton was initially uninterested in directing a sequel to Batman, feeling creatively constrained by Warner Bros.' expectations. He agreed to return only after being granted greater creative control, which included replacing writer Sam Hamm with Daniel Waters and reuniting with many of his previous collaborators. Waters's script emphasized characterization over plot, and Wesley Strick was later hired for an uncredited rewrite that added, among other elements, a master plan for the Penguin. Filming took place from September 1991 to February 1992 on a budget of $50–80 million, primarily on sets and soundstages at Warner Bros. Studios and the Universal Studios Lot in California. The special effects relied mainly on practical techniques and makeup, supplemented with animatronics, limited computer-generated imagery (CGI), and dozens of live penguins.

The marketing campaign was extensive, featuring brand tie-ins and merchandise. Released on June 19, 1992, Batman Returns broke several box-office records and grossed $266.8 million worldwide, becoming the sixth-highest-grossing film of 1992, but fell short of Batman in overall success and longevity. The darker tone, along with violent and sexual content, was cited as alienating family audiences and prompted backlash against marketing partners for promoting the film to children. Critical reception was polarized, though most reviewers praised the principal cast.

Following the mixed reception, Burton was replaced for its more family-friendly sequel, Batman Forever (1995). Keaton also declined to return. In the years since its release, Batman Returns has been reappraised as one of the strongest Batman films and a pivotal early example of auteur-driven superhero cinema that helped shape the genre's darker, more ambitious direction. It is also recognized as an alternative Christmas film for its winter setting, festive imagery, and themes of loneliness and isolation. Its story was revisited in the comic series Batman '89 (2021), and Keaton reprised his version of Batman in The Flash (2023).

== Plot ==
In Gotham City, two wealthy socialites, horrified by the birth of their malformed and feral son Oswald, abandon him in the sewers, where a colony of penguins takes him in. Thirty-three years later, during the Christmas season, wealthy industrialist Max Shreck is abducted by the Red Triangle Gang—former circus performers implicated in child disappearances across the country—and taken to their hideout in the abandoned Arctic exhibit at Gotham Zoo. Their leader, Oswald, now known as the Penguin, blackmails Max with evidence of his corruption and murders, coercing him into helping Oswald re-enter Gotham's high society. Max stages the kidnapping of the mayor's infant child, allowing Oswald to "rescue" the child and become a public hero. In return, Oswald requests access to the city's birth records, claiming he seeks to uncover his true identity by investigating Gotham's first-born sons.

Max attempts to kill his timid secretary, Selina Kyle, by pushing her out of a window after she discovers his plan to build a power plant that would secretly drain and store Gotham's electricity. Selina survives, returns home, crafts a costume, and adopts the persona of Catwoman. To Max's surprise, she reappears at work with newfound confidence and assertiveness, immediately attracting the attention of visiting billionaire Bruce Wayne. As the vigilante Batman, Bruce begins investigating Oswald, suspecting his ties to the Red Triangle Gang. Seeking to remove opposition to his power plant, Max convinces Oswald to run for mayor and discredit the incumbent by unleashing the gang on Gotham. Batman's efforts to quell the violence bring him into conflict with Catwoman, while in their civilian lives Selina and Bruce begin a romance. Meanwhile, Catwoman allies with Oswald to smear Batman's reputation.

During Gotham's Christmas-tree lighting, Oswald and Catwoman kidnap Gotham's beauty queen, the Ice Princess, and lure Batman to a rooftop above the ceremony. Oswald pushes the Ice Princess to her death with a swarm of bats, framing Batman. When Catwoman objects to the murder and rebuffs Oswald's sexual advances, he attacks her, sending her crashing through a glasshouse. Batman escapes in the Batmobile, unaware that the Red Triangle Gang has sabotaged it, allowing Oswald to take it on a remote-controlled rampage. Before regaining control, Batman records Oswald's insulting tirade against Gotham's citizens and later plays it during Oswald's mayoral rally, destroying his public image and forcing him to retreat to Gotham Zoo. There, Oswald renounces his humanity, fully embracing his identity as the Penguin, and sets his plan in motion to abduct and kill Gotham's first-born sons as revenge for his own abandonment.

Selina attempts to kill Max at his charity ball, but Bruce intervenes, and the two inadvertently discover each other's secret identities. Penguin crashes the event intending to kidnap Max's son, Chip, but Max offers himself instead. Batman disrupts the Red Triangle Gang and halts the kidnappings, prompting the Penguin to unleash his missile-equipped penguin army to destroy Gotham. Batman's ally, Alfred Pennyworth, overrides the control signal, redirecting the penguins back to Gotham Zoo. As the missiles obliterate the zoo, Batman unleashes a swarm of bats, causing the Penguin to fall into the toxic waters of the Arctic exhibit. Catwoman confronts Max, rejecting Batman's plea to abandon her revenge and leave with him. Max shoots Batman, incapacitating him, and then shoots Catwoman multiple times, but she survives, claiming she has two of her nine lives left. Catwoman electrocutes Max with a live cable, causing a power surge that appears to kill them both; however, Batman finds only Max's charred remains. The Penguin emerges one last time but succumbs to his injuries, with his penguins carrying his body into the water.

Sometime later, while traveling home, Bruce spots Selina's silhouette but finds only a cat, which he takes with him. The Bat-Signal shines above the city as Catwoman gazes up at it.

== Cast ==
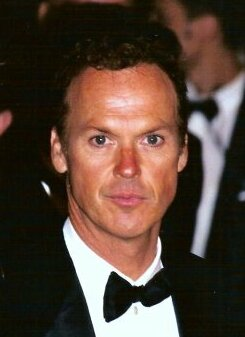
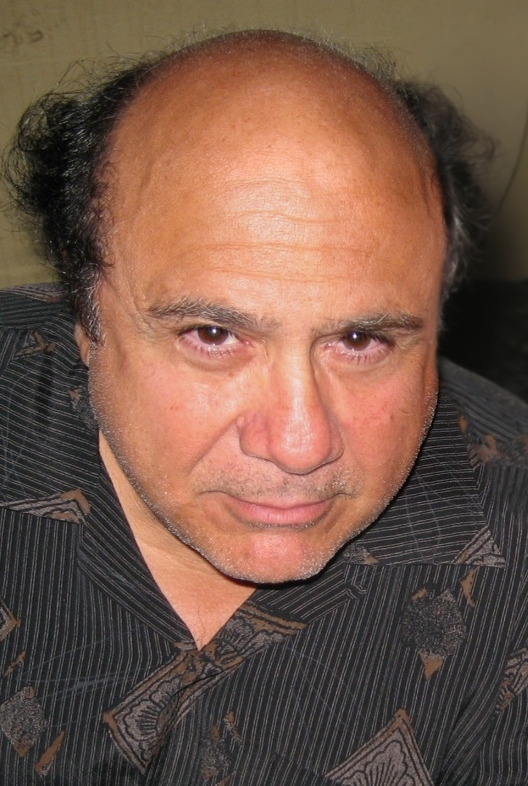
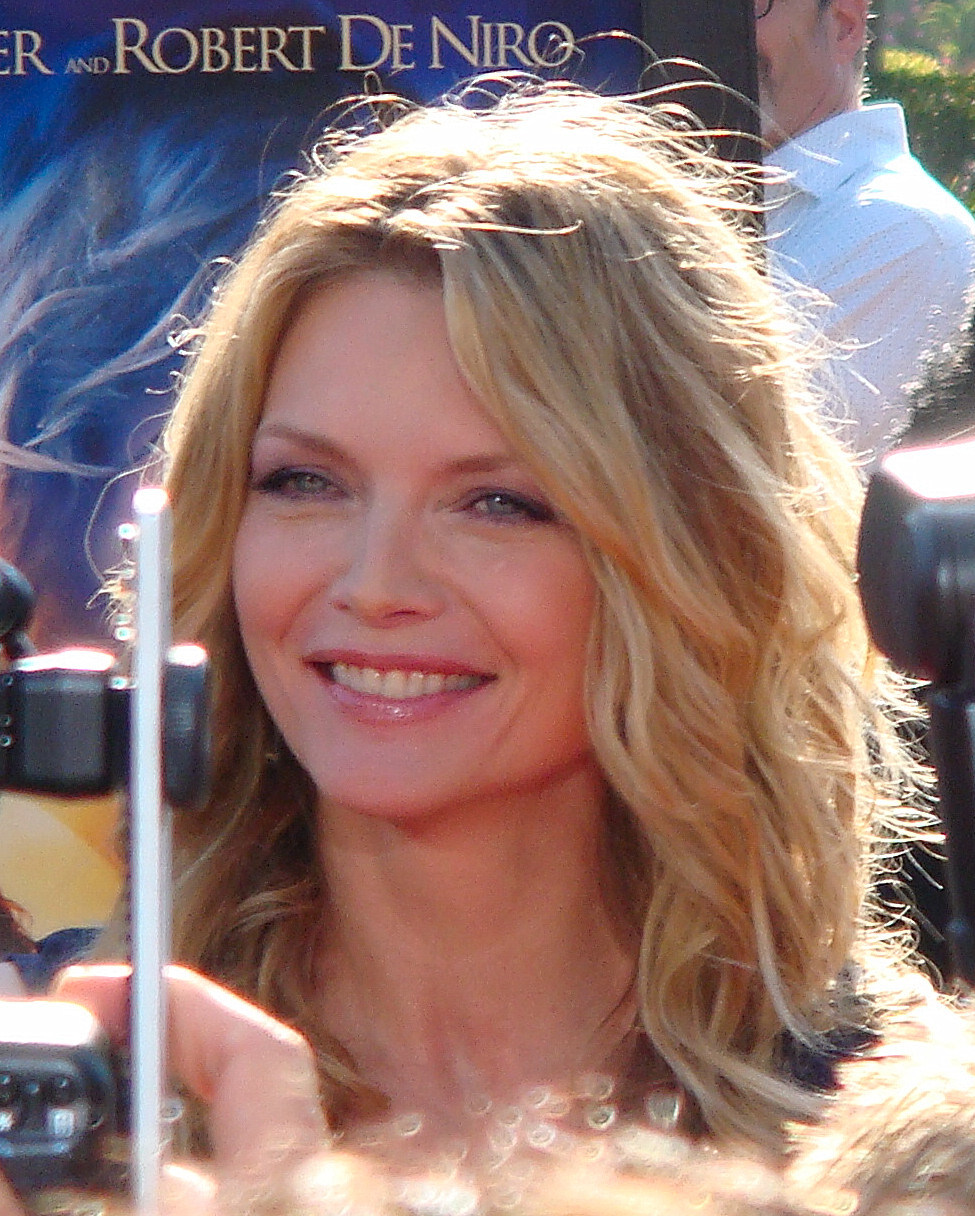
Michael Keaton (in 2002), Danny DeVito (in 2006), and Michelle Pfeiffer (in 2007)
- Michael Keaton as Bruce Wayne / Batman: A billionaire businessman who operates as Gotham's vigilante protector
- Danny DeVito as Oswald Cobblepot / Penguin: A malformed crime boss
- Michelle Pfeiffer as Selina Kyle / Catwoman: A meek assistant turned vengeful villainess
- Christopher Walken as Max Shreck: A ruthless industrialist
- Michael Gough as Alfred Pennyworth: Wayne's butler and surrogate father
- Pat Hingle as James Gordon: The Gotham City police commissioner and Batman's ally
- Michael Murphy as the Mayor: The city's incumbent mayor

The cast of Batman Returns includes Andrew Bryniarski as Max's son Charles "Chip" Schreck and Cristi Conaway as the Ice Princess, Gotham's beauty queen-elect. Paul Reubens and Diane Salinger appear as Tucker and Esther Cobblepot, Oswald's wealthy, elite parents. Sean Whalen appears as a paperboy; Jan Hooks and Steve Witting play Jen and Josh, Oswald's mayoral image consultants.

The Red Triangle Gang includes the monkey-toting Organ Grinder (Vincent Schiavelli), the Poodle Lady (Anna Katarina), the Tattooed Strongman (Rick Zumwalt), the Sword Swallower (John Strong), the Knifethrower Dame (Erika Andersch), the Acrobatic Thug (Gregory Scott Cummins), the Terrifying Clown (Branscombe Richmond), the Fat Clown (Travis Mckenna), and the Thin Clown (Doug Jones).

== Production ==
=== Development ===
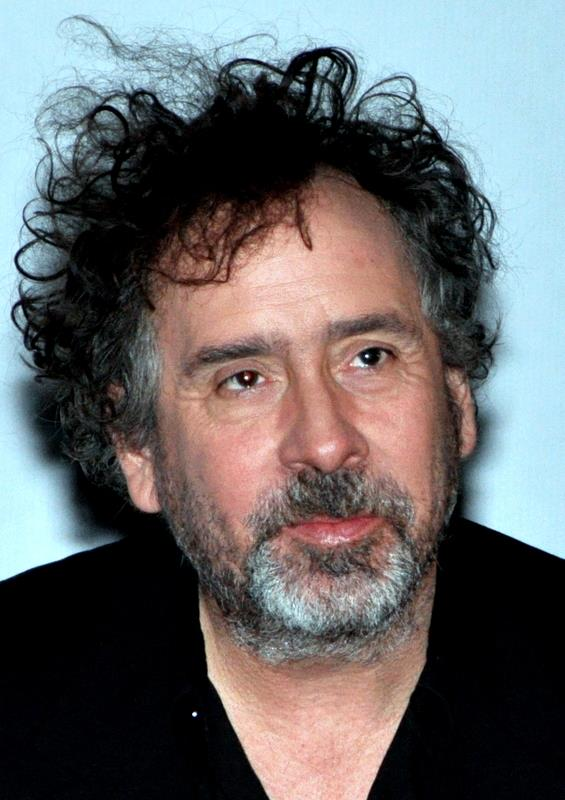
Director Tim Burton (in 2012)

Following the success of Batman (1989), which became the fifth-highest-grossing film of its time, a sequel was considered inevitable. Warner Bros. Pictures began discussing a follow-up by late 1989, with plans to start filming the next May. (Note: Attributed to multiple references:) The studio wanted Robin Williams and Danny DeVito to portray the Riddler and Penguin, respectively, and invested $2 million in acquiring the Gotham City sets at Pinewood Studios in England, intending to reuse them for at least two sequels. The sets were placed under 24-hour surveillance, as maintaining them was more cost-effective than rebuilding. Despite Warner Bros.' pressure to secure a script and begin production, director Tim Burton was hesitant to return. He described the idea of a sequel as "dumbfounded", particularly before the first film's box-office performance could be assessed. Burton was skeptical of sequels in general, believing they were only worthwhile if they offered something new and different.

Batman writer Sam Hamm's initial story treatment expanded on district attorney Harvey Dent—played by Billy Dee Williams in Batman—and charted his transformation into the supervillain Two-Face. Warner Bros., however, pushed for the Penguin as the primary antagonist, whom Hamm believed the studio regarded as Batman's most recognizable foe after the Joker. Catwoman was also added because Burton and Hamm were interested in the character. Hamm's drafts followed directly from Batman, continuing Bruce Wayne's relationship with Vicki Vale (Kim Basinger) and leading to their engagement. His Penguin was depicted as an avian-themed criminal who weaponized birds, while Catwoman was portrayed as more overtly sexual, clad in "bondage" attire, and casually murdering groups of men.

The story paired Penguin and Catwoman in a plot to frame Batman for the murders of Gotham's wealthiest citizens while pursuing a hidden treasure, which ultimately drew them to Wayne Manor and uncovered the Wayne family's secret past. Hamm also introduced the Christmastime setting and included Robin, Batman's sidekick, though his idea of assault rifle-wielding Santas was discarded. In Hamm's drafts, Batman avoided killing and concentrated on protecting Gotham's homeless. Ultimately, his two scripts failed to reignite Burton's interest, and the director instead focused on Edward Scissorhands (1990) and co-writing The Nightmare Before Christmas (1993).

Burton was confirmed to direct the sequel in January 1991, with filming planned to begin later that year for a 1992 release. His decision was influenced by the 1989 departure of Batman producers Peter Guber and Jon Peters to Columbia Pictures, as Burton had been frustrated by the level of creative control they exercised over the first film. He agreed to return only after securing greater creative authority, later admitting that Batman was his least favorite of his films, describing it as "occasionally boring". According to long-time collaborator Denise Di Novi, "Only about 50% of Batman was [Burton]", and Warner Bros. wanted Batman Returns to be "more of a Tim Burton movie ... [a] weirder movie but also more hip and fun".

Burton brought in several long-time collaborators to replace key members of the original Batman crew, including cinematographer Stefan Czapsky, production designer Bo Welch, creature-effects supervisor Stan Winston, makeup artist Ve Neill, and art directors Tom Duffield and Rick Henrichs. He hired Daniel Waters to replace Hamm, preferring a writer with no emotional attachment to Batman. Burton admired Waters's script for the dark comedy Heathers (1988), which reflected the darker tone and creative direction he envisioned for the sequel. Burton reportedly clashed with Peters, demoting him to executive producer and largely excluding him from the set. Warner Bros. served as the production company and distributor, with additional support from executive producer Guber and Peters's Polygram Pictures.

=== Writing ===
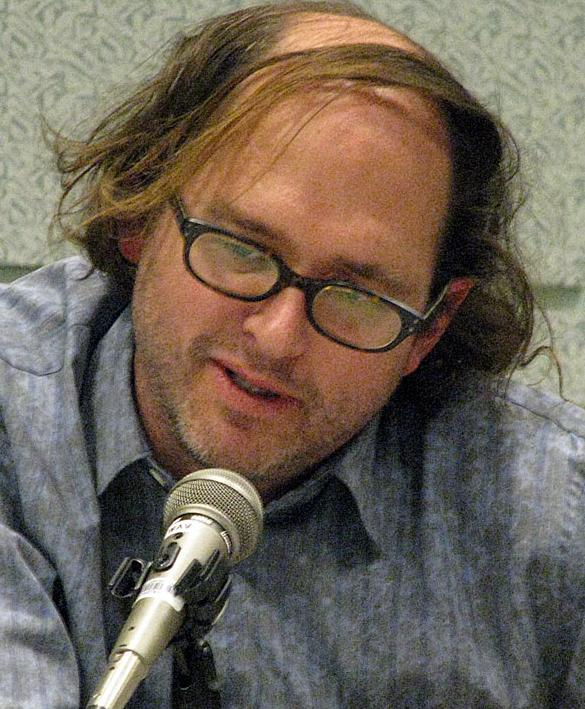
Writer Daniel Waters (in 2008) was hired by Tim Burton to revise Sam Hamm's initial draft.

Waters began work on his first draft in mid-1990. Burton's only guidance was that the script should avoid connections to the previous Batman, aside from a brief reference to Vale as Wayne's former partner, and that Catwoman should be developed with more depth than the typical sexy vixen archetype. Waters, who disliked the 1989 film, ignored its narrative threads and comic-book history, focusing instead on artistic expression. Unlike Hamm, Waters did not object to Batman killing, arguing that the character should reflect darker contemporary sensibilities and that relying on authorities to handle captured villains felt outdated. Even so, he limited Batman's lethal actions to moments that served the story. He also expressed dissatisfaction with unscripted additions, such as the scene where Batman blows up a Red Triangle gang member.

Keaton had Waters remove jabs at the 1989 film's merchandising, including an opening on a merchandise store, saying, "[This] is very clever. Cut it". Waters's dialogue for Batman, which he described as "bitter and cynical"—including lines suggesting Gotham City was unworthy of protection—was pared back because Keaton felt Batman should speak as little as possible in costume, and Burton preferred to portray the character as motivated by trauma rather than nihilism.

As a result, the script focused on the villains. Burton said he initially struggled to understand the appeal of the Penguin's comic-book counterpart; Batman, Catwoman, and the Joker had clear psychological profiles, but the Penguin was "just this guy with a cigarette and a top hat". The initial draft portrayed him as a stereotypical DeVito character—an abrasive gangster—but Waters and Burton agreed to make him more "animalistic". They decided to present the Penguin as a tragic figure, abandoned as an infant by his parents, mirroring Batman's childhood trauma of losing his own parents. Political and social satire was incorporated, influenced by two episodes of the 1960s television series Batman ("Hizzoner the Penguin" and "Dizhonner the Penguin"), in which the Penguin runs for mayor. Waters reimagined Hamm's Catwoman, shifting her from a "fetishy sexual fantasy" femme fatale to a working-class, disenchanted secretary, writing her as an allegory of contemporary feminism.

Waters created Max Shreck—an original character named after actor Max Schreck—to replace Harvey Dent/Two-Face. Shreck was written satirically, an evil industrialist who orchestrates the Penguin's mayoral campaign, to show that true villains do not always wear costumes. In one draft, he was depicted as the Penguin's favored brother. With four central characters to develop, Waters and Burton removed Robin, a garage mechanic who aids Batman after the Penguin crashes the Batmobile, describing the character as "worthless". The Red Triangle gang, initially conceived as a troupe of performance artists, was changed to circus clowns at Burton's request.

Waters said his 160-page first draft was too outlandish and would have cost $400 million to produce, prompting him to adopt a more restrained approach. His fifth and final draft focused on characterization and interactions rather than plot. (Note: Attributed to multiple references:) Burton and Waters eventually fell out over disagreements about the script, particularly Waters's refusal to make requested changes.

Burton hired Wesley Strick to streamline Waters's lengthy script, condense dialogue, and lighten the tone. Warner Bros. executives required Strick to include a master plan for the Penguin, leading to the addition of a plot involving the kidnapping of Gotham's first-born sons and the threat of missile attacks. Strick delivered his draft in August 1991. Waters described the changes as relatively minor but expressed confusion over the Penguin's master plan. He made a final revision to Strick's shooting script, and although Strick was on set for months and involved in agreed-upon rewrites, Waters was the sole credited screenwriter.

=== Casting ===
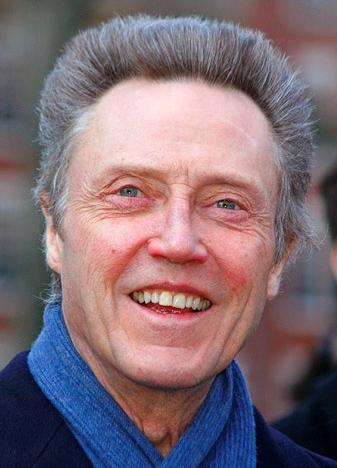
Christopher Walken (pictured in 2008)

Michael Keaton reprised his role as Bruce Wayne / Batman for $10 million, double his salary for Batman. Burton initially wanted Marlon Brando to play the Penguin, but Warner Bros. preferred Dustin Hoffman. Christopher Lloyd and Robert De Niro were also considered, with Danny DeVito emerging as the frontrunner after Waters reimagined the character as a deformed human-bird hybrid. DeVito was initially hesitant to accept the role until persuaded by his close friend Jack Nicholson, who had portrayed the Joker in Batman. To communicate his vision, Burton showed DeVito a painting he had created of a small character sitting on a red-and-white striped ball, captioned: "My name is Jimmy, but my friends call me the hideous penguin boy".

Casting Selina Kyle / Catwoman proved challenging. Annette Bening was initially cast in the role but had to withdraw due to pregnancy. Other actresses considered included Ellen Barkin, Cher, Bridget Fonda, Jennifer Jason Leigh, Madonna, Julie Newmar, Lena Olin, Susan Sarandon, Raquel Welch, and Kim Basinger. The most notable contender was Sean Young, who had been cast as Vale in Batman before an injury prevented her from performing. (Note: Attributed to multiple references:) Young reportedly visited the Warner Bros. lot in a homemade Catwoman costume for an impromptu audition with Burton, who allegedly hid under his desk while Keaton and producer Mark Canton briefly met with her. She also showcased her costume on Entertainment Tonight and pitched it on The Joan Rivers Show. Warner Bros. ultimately decided that Young did not align with their vision for Catwoman. (Note: Attributed to multiple references:)

The role went to Michelle Pfeiffer, who was regarded as a proven actress and someone who worked well with Burton, although some publications suggested the role would challenge her acting range. Pfeiffer had also been considered for the role of Vale in Batman, but Keaton vetoed her casting due to their previous romantic relationship, believing her presence could interfere with attempts to reconcile with his wife. She received a $3 million salary—$2 million more than Bening—plus a share of the film's gross profits. (Note: Attributed to multiple references:) Pfeiffer trained for several months in kickboxing with her stunt double, Kathy Long, mastering the whip and becoming skilled enough to perform many of her own stunts with it. (Note: Attributed to multiple references:)

Shreck's appearance was modeled on Vincent Price in an unspecified older film, while Walken based his performance on moguls such as Sol Hurok and Samuel Goldwyn. Walken said, "I tend to play mostly villains and twisted people. Unsavory guys. I think it's my face, the way I look". Burgess Meredith, who portrayed the Penguin in the 1960s TV series, was originally scheduled to cameo as Penguin's father, Tucker Cobblepot, but became ill during filming. He was replaced by Paul Reubens, while Diane Salinger played Tucker's wife, Esther. Both had previously appeared in Burton's feature-film debut, Pee-wee's Big Adventure (1985).

Although Robin was removed from the final screenplay, the character's development had progressed far enough that Marlon Wayans had already been cast (Burton had specifically wanted an African-American Robin), and costumes, sets, and action figures were created. In a 1998 interview, Wayans said that he continued to receive residual checks under the two-film contract he had signed. (Note: Attributed to multiple references:) Early reports suggested that Nicholson had been asked to return as the Joker, but he declined to film in England due to foreign salary taxes. Nicholson, however, denied being asked, believing that Warner Bros. would not want to replicate the generous compensation he had received for Batman.

=== Filming ===
Principal photography began on September 3, 1991. Burton wanted to film in the United States with American actors, believing that Batman, which had been shot in the United Kingdom, had "suffered from a British subtext". (Note: Attributed to multiple references:) Changes in the economics of filming in the UK also made it more cost-effective to remain in the U.S. This decision required abandoning the Pinewood Studios sets in favor of Burton's new designs. Batman Returns was filmed almost entirely on up to eight soundstages at Warner Bros. Studios, Burbank, California, including Stage 16, which housed the expansive Gotham Plaza set. (Note: Attributed to multiple references:) Stage 12 at the Universal Studios Lot was used for the Penguin's Arctic-exhibit lair. (Note: Attributed to multiple references:) Warner Bros. maintained a high level of security to avoid details leaking for Batman Returns. Cast and crew wore ID badges branded with the film's working title, Dictel, a word coined by Welch and Burton meaning "dictatorial", as they were unhappy with the studio's "ridiculous gestapo" measures.

Some sets were kept very cold for the live Emperor, black-footed, and King penguins. The birds were transported in a refrigerated airplane for filming, and housed in a chilled waiting area with a swimming pool stocked daily with half a ton of ice and fresh fish. DeVito stated that, although he generally enjoyed being on set, he disliked the cold conditions and was the only cast member somewhat comfortable due to the heavy padding in his costume. The penguin army was created using live penguins supplemented by puppets, forty Emperor-penguin suits worn by little people, and computer-generated imagery (CGI). People for the Ethical Treatment of Animals (PETA) protested the use of real penguins, citing concerns over moving the birds from their natural environment. While the organization later acknowledged that the penguins were not mistreated, it criticized the lack of fresh drinking water, noting they were confined to a small chlorinated pool. PETA also objected to the penguins being fitted with prop weapons and gadgets, which Warner Bros. stated were lightweight plastic. Burton himself expressed a reluctance to use live animals, emphasizing his care and concern for their treatment.

Walken described the filming process as highly collaborative, recalling that his suggestion to add a blueprint for Shreck's power plant led to a model being constructed within hours. The scene in which Catwoman places a live bird in her mouth was performed live, with no CGI, and Pfeiffer later remarked that she would not perform the stunt again, given the potential risks of injury or disease. For a sewer scene, handlers positioned above and below guided an organ-grinder monkey carrying a note for the Penguin. When the monkey saw DeVito in full costume and makeup, it lunged at him. DeVito recalled, "The monkey looked at me, froze, and then leapt right at my balls ... Thank god it was a padded costume". A scene depicting the explosion of Shreck's superstore resulted in minor injuries to four stuntmen. Principal photography concluded on February 20, 1992, after 170 days.

=== Design and effects ===
Batman Returns' production design and visual style were reimagined by Bo Welch, replacing the late Anton Furst and bringing a darker, expressionist aesthetic after collaborating with Burton on Beetlejuice (1988) and Edward Scissorhands. Welch designed key props such as the Batskiboat and Penguin's umbrellas, introduced a "Batmissile" mode for the Batmobile, and oversaw large-scale sets including Gotham Plaza and Penguin's lair.

Influenced by German Expressionism—a 1920s cinematic style characterized by harsh shadows, distorted architecture, and psychological intensity—Welch also drew from neo-fascist architecture (including Nazi Germany-era styles), American Precisionist painting, and street-level imagery of homelessness amid affluence. He employed miniatures and exaggerated verticality to evoke a decaying, alienating Gotham. Welch, a trained architect, structured the city on a grid of strong vertical lines, emphasizing huge skyscrapers that transform streets into dark canyons to evoke a sense of victimization and oppression. He researched the look by studying fascist architecture from the Third Reich and world's fairs, styles he felt were "evocative of oppressive bureaucracies and dictatorships", to design the monolithic Gotham Plaza. Welch further drew upon Precisionism, a movement known for using hard outlines, solid shadows, and slick, impersonal surfaces to lend industrial subjects an epic character, citing the work of Charles Sheeler and Georgia O'Keeffe as specific influences. He also incorporated Burton's early sketch of Catwoman, with a "very S&M kind of look", by integrating steel and chain elements into the set, creating the impression of a city collapsing in on itself.

Costume designers Bob Ringwood and Mary Vogt updated the Batsuit with a mechanical look and created a fragile latex Catwoman suit requiring numerous backups. DeVito's Penguin relied on extensive prosthetics by Stan Winston Studio, including black saliva for grotesque effect, and the team built thirty animatronic penguins supplemented with actors and digital effects.

Post-production was intense, with some effects shots conceived just weeks before the June 19, 1992 release. The visual effects workload ultimately encompassed around 115 shots, employing matte paintings, miniatures, CGI, makeup, puppets, and pyrotechnics, handled by six major effects houses including Stan Winston Studio, Boss Film Studios, and Matte World Digital.

=== Post-production ===
Chris Lebenzon edited the 126-minute theatrical cut of Batman Returns. The post-production period was rushed, forcing Burton to present a cut to studio executives only four weeks after filming wrapped—far shorter than his typical editing timelines.

The final scene of Catwoman looking up at the Bat-Signal was filmed during post-production, just two weeks before release. Warner Bros. mandated the scene—showing that Catwoman survived—after test audiences responded positively to Pfeiffer's performance. Pfeiffer was unavailable, so a stand-in was used. (Note: Attributed to multiple references:) Although the character draws on feline mythology—such as cats having nine lives—Waters and Burton never intended the supernatural elements to be taken literally, and Catwoman was planned to definitively die alongside Shreck. A scene showing Penguin's gang destroying a store filled with Batman merchandise was also removed.

Warner Bros. provided a final budget of $55 million for Batman Returns, though other sources have cited estimates of $50 million, $65 million, $75 million, or $80 million. (Note: Attributed to multiple references:) (Note: The 1992 budget of $50–$80 million is equivalent to $115 million–$206 million in 2025.)

=== Music ===
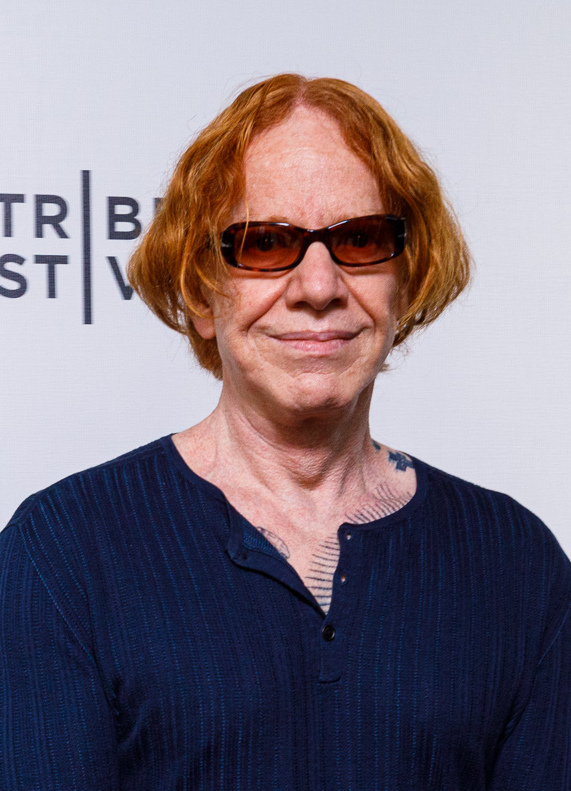
Composer Danny Elfman in 2022

Danny Elfman was initially reluctant to score Batman Returns because he was unhappy that his Batman score was supplemented with pop music by Prince. Elfman built on many of his Batman themes, and said that he enjoyed working on the Penguin's themes the most because of the character's sympathetic aspects, such as his abandonment and death. Recorded with a studio orchestra on the Sony Scoring Stage in Los Angeles, Elfman's score includes vocals, harps, bells, xylophones, flutes, pianos, and chimes. Burton and Elfman fell out during production due to the stress of finishing Batman Returns on time, but reconciled shortly afterward.

The song "Face to Face", played during the costume-ball scene, was co-written and performed by the British rock band Siouxsie and the Banshees.

== Release ==
=== Context ===
By the summer theatrical season of 1992 (starting the last week of May), the film industry faced low ticket sales, rising production costs, and several box-office failures from the previous year. Eighty-nine films were scheduled for release, including A League of Their Own, Alien 3, Encino Man, Far and Away, Patriot Games, and Sister Act. Studios had to carefully plan releases to avoid competition from anticipated blockbusters, such as Lethal Weapon 3, Batman Returns, and the 1992 Summer Olympics. Batman Returns was predicted to be the summer's biggest hit, causing other studios to worry about scheduling films even a few weeks from its premiere. Paramount Pictures reportedly increased Patriot Games' budget by $14 million to make it more competitive with Batman Returns and Lethal Weapon 3.

=== Marketing ===
Franchising had not been a major focus for Batman prior to its release, but after merchandise generated roughly $500 million of the film's $1.5 billion total earnings, it became a priority for Batman Returns. A 12-minute promotional reel debuted at WorldCon in September 1991, alongside a black-and-white poster of a silhouetted Batman, which was deemed "mundane" and uninspiring by industry professionals. Warner Bros. delayed major promotion until February 1992 to avoid over-saturation and alienating audiences. A trailer rolled out in 5,000 theaters that month, accompanied by a new poster showing a snow-swept Batman logo. The campaign focused on the three central characters—Batman, Penguin, and Catwoman—which Warner Bros. believed would offset the absence of the popular Nicholson. Over two-thirds of the 300 public posters were stolen, prompting Warner Bros. to offer 200 limited-edition posters for $250, signed by Keaton, who donated his earnings to charity.

Marketing expenditures were expected to exceed $100 million, including $20 million by Warner Bros. for commercials and trailers and $60 million by merchandising partners. These partners—including McDonald's, Ralston Purina, Kmart, Target Corporation, Venture Stores, and Sears—planned roughly 300 in-store Batman shops. McDonald's converted 9,000 outlets into Gotham City restaurants, featuring Batman-themed packaging and a cup lid that doubled as a flying disc. CBS aired the television special The Bat, The Cat, The Penguin ... Batman Returns, while Choice Hotels sponsored the hour-long The Making of Batman Returns. TV ads depicted Batman and Catwoman fighting over a can of Diet Coke, with the Penguin (and his penguins) promoting Choice Hotels, and additional advertisements ran on billboards and in print—sometimes across three consecutive newspaper pages—targeting older audiences.

=== Box office ===
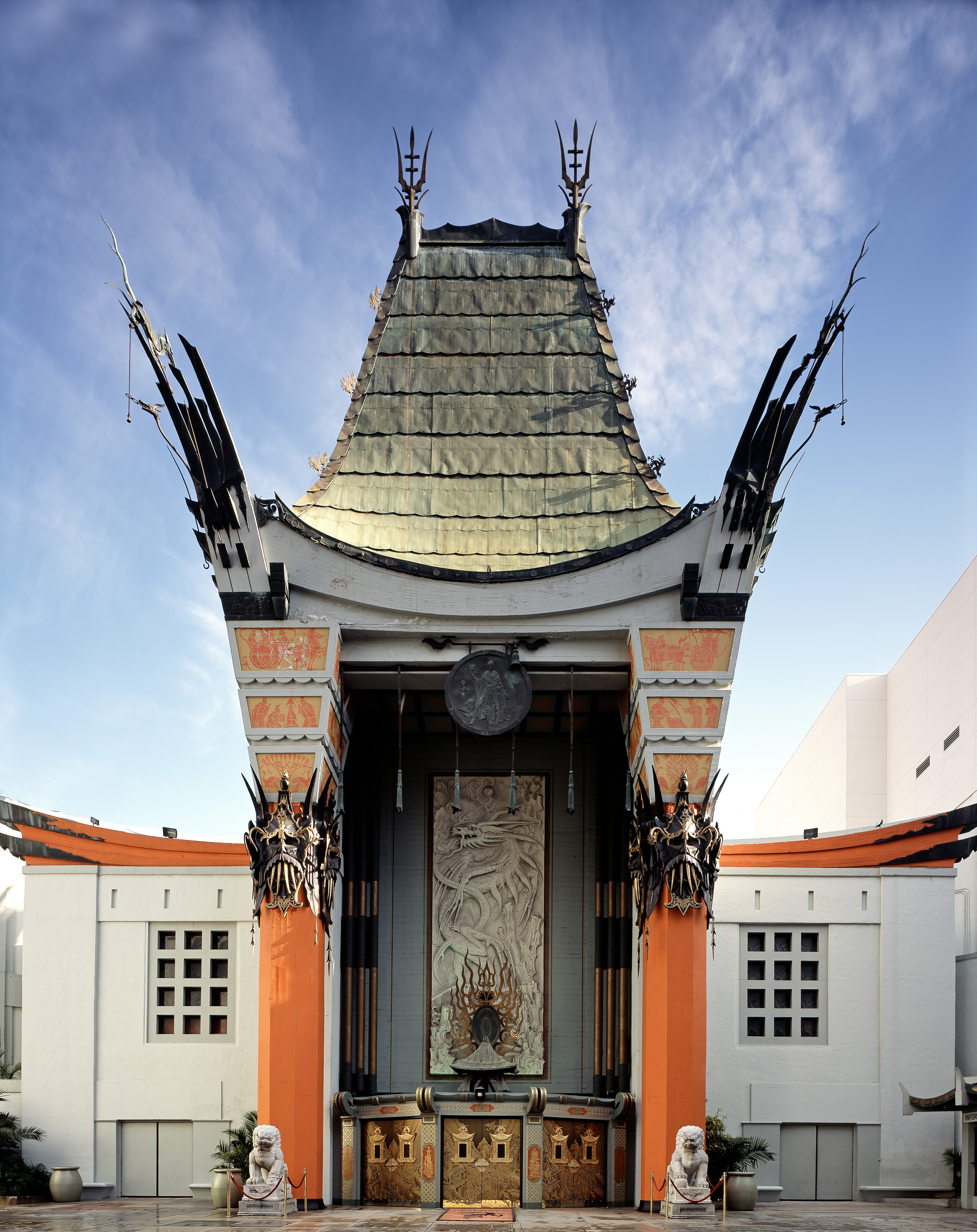
Batman Returns premiered at the Grauman's Chinese Theatre (pictured in 2005) in Hollywood.

Batman Returns premiered on June 16, 1992, at Grauman's Chinese Theatre in Hollywood. Two blocks of Hollywood Boulevard were closed for more than 3,000 fans, 33 TV film crews, and 100 photographers. A party followed on the Stage 16 Gotham Plaza set, attended by the cast and crew, as well as Arnold Schwarzenegger, Faye Dunaway, James Caan, Mickey Rooney, Harvey Keitel, Christian Slater, and James Woods, among others.

The film had a limited preview release in the U.S. and Canada on Thursday, June 18, grossing $2 million. It expanded widely the following day, playing on an above-average 3,000 screens across 2,644 theaters. Batman Returns grossed $45.7 million in its opening weekend, breaking the record set by Batman ($42.7 million), and debuted as the number-one film, topping Sister Act ($7.8 million in its fourth weekend) and Patriot Games ($7.7 million in its third). Batman Returns was the first feature film released in Dolby Stereo Digital, in select theaters, marking a milestone in cinema audio technology that later became synonymous with surround sound in theaters.

Early analysis suggested Batman Returns could become one of the highest-grossing films of all time. Warner Bros. executive Robert Friedman noted, "We opened it the first real weekend when kids are out of school. The audience is everybody, but the engine that drives the charge are kids under 20". Patriot Games producer Mace Neufeld observed that other films benefited from overflow audiences who avoided long lines or sold-out screenings of Batman Returns.

Batman Returns grossed $25.4 million in its second weekend—a 44.3 percent drop—yet remained the number-one film ahead of the debuting Unlawful Entry ($10.1 million) and Sister Act ($7.2 million). By its third weekend, it became the second-fastest film to reach $100 million (11 days), behind Batman (10 days). It held the top spot with $13.8 million (a 45.6 percent drop), narrowly edging out the debuts of A League of Their Own ($13.7 million) and Boomerang ($13.6 million). The Washington Post described its steep week-to-week declines as concerning, and industry analysts suggested that Batman Returns would struggle to match the theatrical longevity of Batman. The film exited the top ten highest-grossing films by its seventh week and concluded its 18-week run in late October with a total U.S. and Canada gross of $162.8 million. This made it the third-highest-grossing film of 1992, behind Home Alone 2: Lost in New York ($173.6 million) and Aladdin ($217.3 million).

Outside the U.S. and Canada, Batman Returns grossed $104 million, setting U.K. records for the highest-grossing opening weekend (£2.5 million) and single-day gross (£1.1 million).

Worldwide, Batman Returns grossed $266.8 million, (Note: The 1992 theatrical box office gross of $266.8 million is equivalent to $612 million in 2025.) making it the sixth-highest-grossing film of 1992, ahead of A Few Good Men ($243.2 million) and behind Lethal Weapon 3 ($321.7 million).

== Reception ==
=== Critical response ===
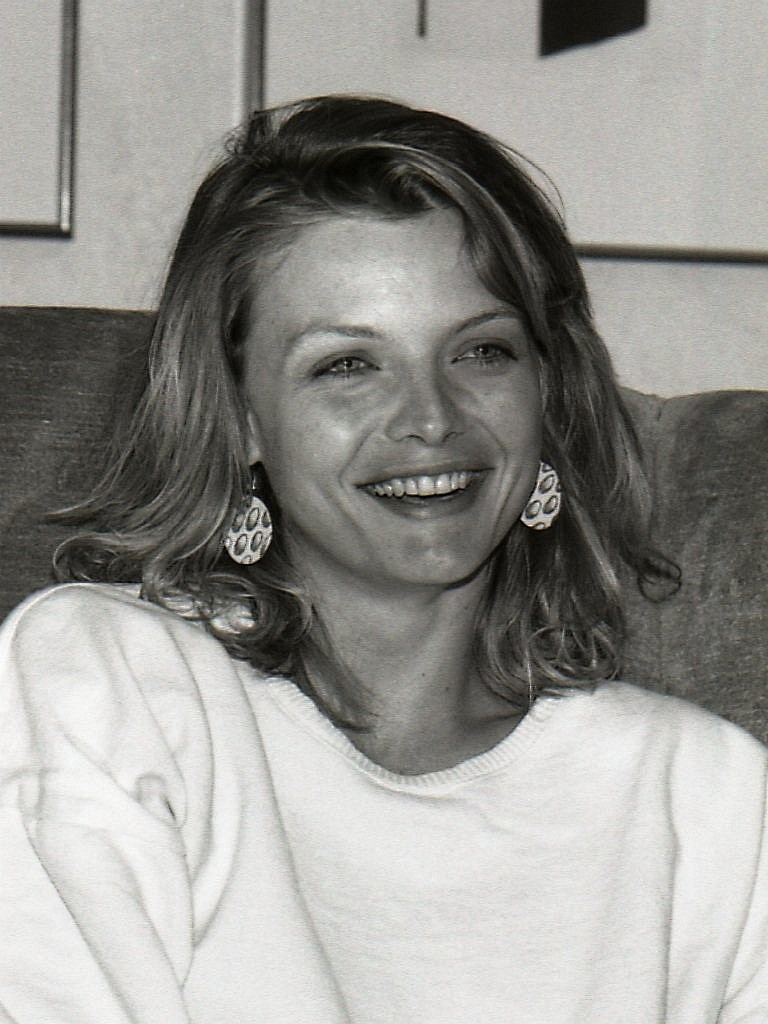
Michelle Pfeiffer in 1985. Although critics were polarized by many aspects of Batman Returns, Pfeiffer's performance received near-unanimous praise.

Batman Returns drew a polarized response from critics and audiences, with its darker tone and mature content proving divisive. CinemaScore polling reported an average grade from audiences of B on an A+-to-F scale.

Some reviewers, including Janet Maslin and Desson Howe, compared the sequel favorably to Batman, citing faster pacing, increased humor, and greater character depth, which avoided the original's "dourness" and "tedium". (Note: Attributed to multiple references:) Maslin and Dave Kehr emphasized that Burton's creative control made Batman Returns a more personal and "fearlessly" distinctive work. Critics such as Kenneth Turan commended the film's visuals but argued that the emphasis on spectacle sometimes made it feel cheerless and claustrophobic, occasionally at the expense of the plot. Owen Gleiberman suggested that Burton's imaginative flourishes were undermined by a lack of grounding in normality.

The narrative received mixed reactions. Howe and Turan praised the film for adding emotional depth to its characters, particularly Catwoman and the Penguin, though Turan noted a lag in pacing midway. In contrast, Todd McCarthy found the story cluttered, with too many plotlines diminishing momentum. Gleiberman similarly argued that the numerous storylines created a sense of disjointedness. Critics generally agreed that the first two acts were more compelling than the finale, which they believed struggled to resolve multiple character arcs satisfactorily. Others, including Jonathan Rosenbaum, believed the film lacked suspense and clever writing, overwhelmed by characters and near-constant banter. Maslin observed that Burton prioritized visuals over plot. Gene Siskel argued that the sympathetic villains diminished narrative satisfaction, leaving viewers wishing Batman might not prevail.

Critics noted that the film devoted more attention to its villains than to Batman himself. Gleiberman remarked that the villain sequences often overshadowed Keaton's performance. McCarthy described Batman as a symbolic figure rather than a psychologically complex character, while Ebert viewed being Batman as a curse rather than a heroic fantasy. Conversely, Peter Travers praised Keaton's "manic depressive hero" as a fully realized character.

DeVito was acclaimed by Gleiberman, McCarthy, and Maslin for his energetic and distinctive portrayal, effectively conveying pathos and complexity despite heavy prosthetics. Howe highlighted Burton's focus on the character as indicative of directorial sympathy, while Maslin and Caryn James praised DeVito's charm, making the Penguin a compelling and memorable presence. McCarthy and Travers described him as fascinating and humorously warped. Turan and Rosenbaum, however, felt he did not evoke the same fear or energy as Nicholson's Joker.

Turan, Kehr, and Maslin praised Pfeiffer for her passionate, intelligent, and fiercely independent performance, providing energy and levity amid the film's dark tone. Rosenbaum felt she did not match Nicholson's villainy, though Turan called the Batman–Catwoman scenes the most interesting. Travers noted that when the characters remove their masks, they appear "lost and touchingly human," and Ty Burr described the ballroom scene as more emotionally resonant than anything in Batman. Ebert observed that their sexual tension seemed muted for a younger audience.

Walken's performance was praised for its combination of charm, wit, and understated authority. Maslin emphasized Walken's debonair and engaging performance as one of the film's highlights, while McCarthy noted his understated, composed delivery. Travers also remarked on his clever and amusing take on the character, describing him as a "fiendishly funny" presence.

Bo Welch's production design received acclaim for creating a sleeker, brighter, and more authoritarian Gotham than Furst's "brooding" style. McCarthy lauded Welch's realization of Burton's vision, though Siskel dismissed it as "toy shop window decorating" compared to Furst. Costume and makeup design were praised, with Maslin noting their lingering visual impact. Stefan Czapsky's cinematography was well received, lending a "lively" quality to the subterranean sets.

=== Accolades ===
At the 46th British Academy Film Awards, Batman Returns was nominated for Best Makeup (Ve Neill and Stan Winston) and Best Special Visual Effects (Michael Fink, Craig Barron, John Bruno, and Dennis Skotak). For the 65th Academy Awards, Batman Returns received two nomations: Best Makeup (Neill, Ronnie Specter, and Winston) and Best Visual Effects (Fink, Barron, Bruno, and Skotak). Neill and Winston received the Best Make-up award at the 19th Saturn Awards. The film received four other Saturn Award nominations for Best Fantasy Film, Best Supporting Actor (DeVito), Best Director (Burton), and Best Costume Design (Bob Ringwood, Mary Vogt, and Vin Burnham). DeVito was nominated for Worst Supporting Actor at the 13th Golden Raspberry Awards, and Pfeiffer for Most Desirable Female at the 1993 MTV Movie Awards. Batman Returns was nominated for a Hugo Award for Best Dramatic Presentation.

== After release ==
=== Performance analysis and aftermath ===
The U.S. and Canadian box office underperformed in 1992, with admissions down by up to five percent and about 290 million tickets sold (compared to over 300 million in each of the preceding four years). Industry professionals attributed the decline to a combination of uninspired films, rising ticket prices, competition from the Olympics, and an economic recession. Even financially successful films experienced steep week-to-week drops, particularly among younger audiences, who were vital to box office success.

Despite these challenges, Batman Returns and Lethal Weapon 3 gave Warner Bros. the most profitable first half-year in its history, with the studio expecting returns over $200 million. However, Batman Returns fell $114.8 million short of Batman's $411.6 million gross, and was considered a disappointment as a sequel to the fifth-highest-grossing film of its time. By July 1992, anonymous Warner Bros. executives reportedly said about the film, "It's too dark. It's not a lot of fun".

Although it carried a PG-13 rating—warning that it may contain content unsuitable for children—Warner Bros. received thousands of complaint letters from parents who objected to the film's violent and sexualized content. Waters recalled one screening where "It's like kids crying, people acting like they've been punched in the stomach and like they've been mugged". He anticipated some backlash but admitted that certain elements may have gone too far. Burton later said that he preferred Batman Returns to Batman and did not view it as darker. Sam Hamm defended Burton and Waters, stating that, aside from merchandising, the film had never been intended as child-friendly.

McDonald's was also criticized for its child-centered promotion and toy tie-ins. (Note: Attributed to multiple references:) The company subsequently changed its practices, requiring extended previews of films before agreeing to promotional partnerships. Warner Bros.' hopes that the film might mirror Batman's lucrative merchandising campaign were similarly undercut, as demand for licensed products proved far weaker than in 1989. A JCPenney representative reported that only about one-third of stock had sold, with the remainder discounted, while another store described sales as barely a tenth of Batman's.

In light of the backlash and merchandising decline, Warner Bros. chose to continue the series without Burton, whom they considered "too dark and odd for them", and hired Joel Schumacher to direct the next installment. A rival studio executive remarked, "If you bring back Burton and Keaton, you're stuck with their vision. You can't expect Honey, I Shrunk the Batman", referencing the family-friendly Honey, I Shrunk the Kids (1989). Around the same time, executive producers Benjamin Melniker and Michael Uslan sued Warner Bros., alleging that the studio had denied them their share of profits from Batman and Batman Returns through Hollywood accounting practices—artificially inflating a film's production costs to make it appear unprofitable and limit payouts. A court ruled in Warner Bros.' favor, citing insufficient evidence.

=== Home media ===
Batman Returns was released on VHS and LaserDisc on October 21, 1992. The VHS carried a lower-than-average price to encourage sales and rentals. Although the film was expected to sell millions of copies and perform strongly as a rental, commentators suggested its darker tone would limit appeal among children, the demographic most responsible for driving home-video sales. Batman Returns was one of the best-selling and highest-rented home releases of November 1992, and became the twelfth-best-selling video of 1993 in the United States. Danny Elfman's score was issued on compact disc in 1992, with an expanded edition released in 2010.

The film was first released on DVD in 1997, without additional features. In October 2005, Warner Bros. issued an anthology DVD box set containing all four films in the Burton–Schumacher Batman series. The Batman Returns disc included a commentary by Burton, the making-of featurette The Bat, The Cat, and The Penguin, the fourth part of the documentary Shadows of the Bat: The Cinematic Saga of the Dark Knight, featurettes on costumes, make-up, and special effects, and the music video for "Face to Face".

The anthology set was reissued on Blu-ray in 2009, alongside a standalone Blu-ray edition of Batman Returns. A 4K Ultra HD Blu-ray edition, restored from the original 35mm negative, was released in 2019 with previously available special features. A 4K collector's edition followed in 2022, packaged in a SteelBook case with original cover art, character cards, a double-sided poster, and the earlier supplements.

=== Other media ===
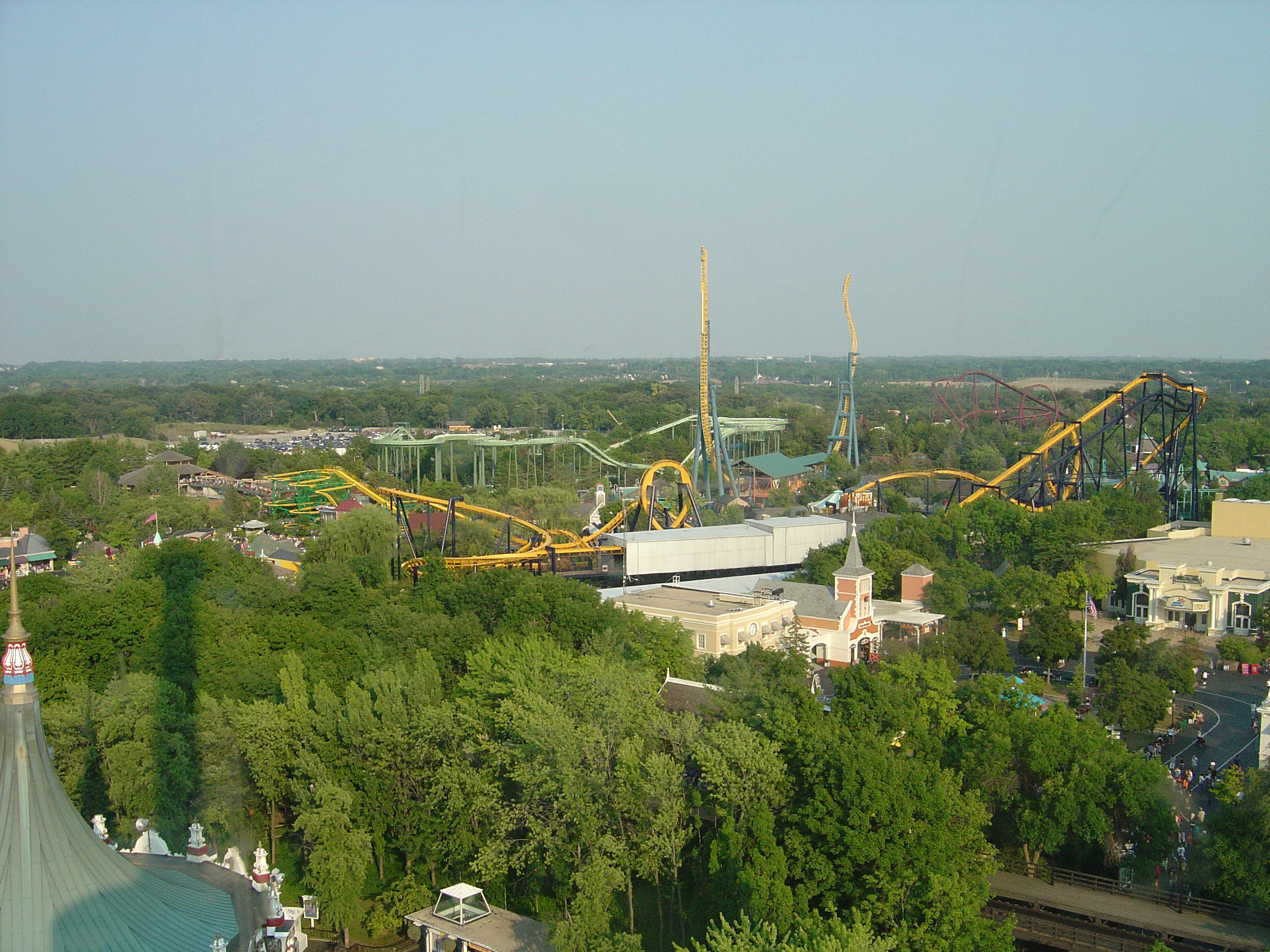
Batman: The Ride at Six Flags Great America was opened in 1992 with Batman Returns.

About 120 products were marketed with Batman Returns, including action figures and toys by Kenner Products, Catwoman-themed clothing, toothbrushes, roller skates, T-shirts, underwear, sunglasses, towels, beanbags, mugs, weightlifting gloves, throw pillows, cookie cutters, commemorative coins, playing cards, costume jewelry, cereal, a radio-controlled Batmobile, and even tortilla chips shaped like the Batman logo. Although a similar number of products had been marketed for Batman (1989), Warner Bros. used fewer licensees this time to allow greater oversight. To combat counterfeiting, holographic labels developed by American Bank Note Holographics were attached to licensed merchandise. The concurrent release of Batman: The Animated Series later in 1992 was expected to extend merchandising success beyond the film's theatrical run.

Other tie-ins included a novelization by Craig Shaw Gardner, published in July 1992, and the roller coaster Batman: The Ride at Six Flags Great America, built at a cost of $8 million and later replicated at additional Six Flags parks alongside a Batman stunt show. Several video-game adaptations titled Batman Returns were released across nearly all available platforms; the Super Nintendo Entertainment System version was the most successful.

The film's legacy continued in later media. To celebrate the Penguin's 80th anniversary, DeVito wrote the 2021 comic story "Bird Cat Love", in which Penguin and Catwoman fall in love and end the COVID-19 pandemic. In 2022, DC Comics launched Batman '89, a series written by Sam Hamm with art by Joe Quinones, which continues the Burton continuity, following up on Batman Returns by depicting Harvey Dent's transformation into Two-Face and introducing Robin. The Red Triangle Gang made their first appearance outside the film in Robin #15 (2022). That same year, a holiday tie-in book was released, Batman Returns: One Dark Christmas Eve: The Illustrated Holiday Classic, by Ivan Cohen. In 2023, Lego released a near 4,000-piece Batcave set inspired by Batman Returns.

Two novels, set between the events of Batman and Batman Returns were written by John Jackson Miller: Batman: Resurrection (2024) and Batman: Revolution (2025).

== Thematic analysis ==
=== Duality and fragmented identity ===
Critic David Crow identifies duality as a central motif in Batman Returns, noting that Catwoman, Penguin, and Shreck each reflect warped aspects of Batman. English and American studies professor Carol Siegel contends that the film is a neo-gothic fairy tale exploring bodily transformation and fragmented identity, often through the lens of rage against oppressive social structures.

Siegel argues that the film is unique within the Batman mythos because it is "more concerned with Bruce Wayne than his alter ego", resulting in an "almost complete abandonment of the action-adventure aspect of the comic tradition". The divided selves of Bruce and Selina are central to the narrative, and themes of fractured identity are especially evident in Catwoman's transformation. According to author Simon Born, the dual identities constrain both characters, and their fleeting recognition at the masquerade ball is undermined by what he terms their "advanced schizophrenia". Like Bruce, Selina is driven by trauma and inner conflict; unlike Batman, who seeks justice, she seeks vengeance. Although Catwoman acknowledges Batman's assertion that they are "the same, split right down the center", their differences prevent reconciliation.

Critics Darren Mooney and Betsy Sharkey argue that Penguin mirrors Batman's origin, as both lost their parents at an early age. Shreck even notes that, if not for his abandonment, Oswald Cobblepot and Bruce Wayne might have shared social circles. While Batman accepts his solitude, the Penguin craves acceptance, love, and respect, despite his destructive impulses. Mooney suggests Batman's conflicts with Penguin are personal rather than moral: Batman, quietly proud of being a "freak", resents the Penguin for mirroring his own abnormality. Shreck, meanwhile, embodies Bruce's public persona taken to extremes—an industrialist whose greed and populism are masked by cheap gestures toward the public.

Born describes Batman Returns as a highly stylized neo-gothic work in which identity, social critique, and psychological trauma are externalized through an opulent design. He refers to Gotham as an "insurrection of signs", where established symbols are inverted and notions of good and evil destabilized. Born further argues that Batman has lost his personal identity to his alter ego: "Bruce Wayne is the mask of Batman". Batman uses this monstrous persona to shield himself from the world. Born notes that the hero's violence is depicted with a "casualness and malice" that is intended to unsettle the audience. This portrayal implies that Batman is not far removed from the "relentless methods" of the fascistic powers he once opposed in earlier comics.

=== The carnivalesque and social critique ===
Writer Catherine Mettler describes Batman Returns as a cinematic application of Mikhail Bakhtin's theory of the carnivalesque, which posits that carnival can invert existing power hierarchies and enable popular renewal. Burton's work is characterized by elements that are "exuberantly colorful, gay, hallucinogenic, childlike, and chaotic", which he applies to films such as Pee-wee's Big Adventure (1985) and Charlie and the Chocolate Factory (2005).

The Penguin is a key embodiment of the carnivalesque, particularly through the concept of the grotesque body. Mettler highlights his deformed physicality and excessive appetites as representations of the "unbounded" and "materially linked" body of the common people. His sewer lair is described as a circus, further emphasizing the visual chaos of his character. Living among the city's waste, the Penguin's existence underscores the stark divide between the elite and the masses he represents. As the "least obvious carnivalesque character", Catwoman embodies the theme on a personal level. Her transformation aligns with Bakhtin's notion of a carnival spirit that liberates a person from "conventions and established truths" and offers entry into "a completely new order of things".

Selina, a victim of a "sexist macho society", is pushed out a window by her boss. Born argues that Selina empowers herself by adapting the "symbol of her oppression—the cat" and reframing it as a "furious panther" in opposition to the chauvinistic business world. Her rebellion reflects post-feminist theories linking sexuality, power, and identity. However, Born argues that her struggle against masculine authority ultimately fails, as her autonomy is continually challenged by male characters, reflecting Hollywood's patriarchal system.

=== Sexuality and repression ===
Batman Returns is noted for its exploration of sexuality, particularly the relationship between Batman and Catwoman, with critics often citing its S&M undertones and the use of leather fetish suits. Siegel described the film as an "S&M art film" marketed as a children's summer blockbuster. She argues that the film's exploration of fetishism, perversity, and eroticism is central to its neo-gothic themes.

According to Siegel, a central theme in Burton's work, including Batman Returns, is the "shared exhilaration and anxiety concerning bodily transformation". This is most evident in Catwoman, whose transformation is marked by prominent stitches on her homemade patent-leather suit. These stitches are both literal and symbolic, testifying to her reanimation after her death and revival by alley cats. Siegel posits that the act of sewing her own suit functions as an ironic mimicry of the oppressive feminine social roles that had previously terrorized her.

Siegel suggests that Batman and Catwoman's consensual S&M-coded relationship is mitigated by their heroic actions, which allow them to channel "both their rage and their perverse desires into their ongoing fight against destructive evil". She contends this portrayal suggests that S&M can be regarded as "nearly wholesome so long as it is manifested with control and proper purpose". Other critics interpret Batman and Catwoman's attraction less as sexual perversity and more as a "romance between two schizophrenics," rooted in shared anger and emotional wounds.

Critic Tom Breihan described Catwoman's vinyl catsuit as "pure BDSM", complete with the whip she wields as a weapon. In the climax, she rejects Batman's offer of a happy ending and abandoning her revenge against Shreck; accepting Batman's will would mean allowing another man to control her. Selina's arc from timid secretary to dominant Catwoman represents liberation from social conventions and established truths. For Siegel, her stitched-together "Frankensteinean" catsuit is an artistic embodiment of her rage against patriarchal and repressive roles that once defined her. Her story is one of personal empowerment against male hegemony, culminating in her showdown with Shreck. Catwoman's overt embrace of sexuality contrasts with Batman's repression, presenting sexuality as dangerous, destabilizing, and incompatible with their vigilante roles. Her sexuality functions both as empowerment and as a threat to patriarchal structures embodied by Shreck, Batman, and Penguin.

Alongside Catwoman's sexualized persona, Batman Returns continues a tradition in Batman media in which the hero's power stems from sublimating sexuality into violence. Criminal justice scholar Graeme Newman said that, historically, Batman has been portrayed as asexual, reinforcing his obsessive focus on crime-fighting and echoing a moral stance that renounces "the medieval evil itself: sex". His "tremendous force" of sexuality is redirected into "unrestrained lust: violence", presenting a distinctly male response to desire.

In Batman, his sexual encounter with Vicki Vale leaves him restless and disturbed, suggesting intimacy conflicts with his crime-fighting obsession. The avoidance of homosexual themes—such as omitting Robin from the film or killing him in comics—was partly driven by fears that such portrayals would "contradict and divert attention away from the single-minded pursuit of justice". The dynamic between Batman and Catwoman underscores this tension; both recognize that if they were to be together, they would no longer need to pursue their respective justice obsessions. Mettler notes that while Catwoman achieves independence from social constraints and male control, she never achieves sexual liberation, observing that despite their attraction, she and Batman never consummate their relationship. Film analyst Arthur Taussig argues that Catwoman's final decision in Batman Returns to reject the heroic Batman and choose "total freedom, total independence from all men" is a "revolutionary statement" and a "political breakthrough for popular cinema," as it subverts the traditional Hollywood formula of female characters finding fulfillment only through a male partner.

=== Power, politics, and ideology ===
These tensions between sexuality and repression feed directly into the film's broader exploration of power and ideology, most clearly embodied in the Penguin's mayoral campaign, which Shreck masterminds.

Selina gains agency by donning the Catwoman costume and embracing her anger and sexuality. By contrast, according to Newman, Batman sublimates sexuality into violence, aligning him with a conservative ideology: order requires the denial of personal desire, and strength must be expressed through "good violence" in service of justice.

The film's political themes are interwoven with the machinations of Shreck, a figure who wields wealth to secure influence, declaring, "There's no such thing as too much power; if my life has a meaning that's the meaning". Born argues that Shreck is arguably the film's only purely evil character; he is more frightening than the "freaks and monsters" because he operates "behind a façade of normalcy" while manipulating, corrupting, and killing others. Born contends that Burton's work suggests the true source of fear is not "the Other" (the outsider) but the "ordinary". He further explains that Burton portrays the film's "freaks and monsters" as victimized individuals: the Penguin, abandoned by wealthy parents, lashes out at the consumer society that rejected him; Catwoman emerges from a chauvinistic world; and even Batman is a "traumatized individual". Born concludes that the film ultimately destabilizes the binaries of good and evil, framing them as subjective narrative constructs.

Shreck convinces Penguin to run for mayor to advance his own interests, while Penguin seeks the legitimacy and respect that recognition would bring, echoing Catwoman's struggle. Critic Caryn James observed that Batman Returns delivers "sharp political jabs", suggesting that money and image matter more than substance. Whereas the Joker in Batman won support by throwing money into the crowd, Shreck and Penguin rely on spectacle, pandering, and corporate showmanship. Penguin notes that both he and Shreck are monsters, but only Shreck is "well-respected". James remarked that Penguin does not seek to become lovable, only accepted. When voters turn on him, he retaliates with a plan to kill infants, symbols of the opportunities he never had. Critic John Crow argued that Burton shows greatest sympathy for Penguin, devoting more screen time to his development.

The narrative aligns with Newman's interpretation of the film as delivering a "deeply conservative message". The ineffectual liberal mayor is outmaneuvered by Shreck, the "evil capitalist", while Gotham's "fickle masses" nearly elect Penguin. In this reading, "the moral weakness of liberalism is eclipsed by the moral strength of evil", leaving Batman's "good violence" as the only force capable of restoring order. The interplay of sexuality and politics completes this logic: Catwoman's sexuality threatens male control, Batman's repression channels desire into violence, and Gotham's citizens, manipulated by spectacle, require a morally certain, if brutal, hero to save them from themselves.

These artistic and political strands are closely tied to Burton's personal rebellious impulses. He admitted a desire to vent anger "on such a grand scale," claiming he was "pretty much against society from the beginning". This resistance to class hierarchy and patriarchy recurs throughout his work.

=== Christmas, capitalism, and cultural critique ===
Crow and Mooney saw Batman Returns as a critique of Batman's real-world cultural popularity and merchandising, particularly following the success of the previous film. Notably, a scene of a store filled with Batman merchandise being destroyed was removed from the final cut. The film is "saturated with Christmas energy", but rejects conventional holiday norms to function as an anti-Christmas film that critiques commercialism and the absence of true goodwill. Shreck cynically exploits Christmas tropes, falsely portraying himself as selfless and benevolent, while the perversions of Penguin's Red Triangle gang represent a more overt rejection of the holiday.

Born describes Christmas as a central motif in the film, but it is portrayed as a symbol of "commercial mass deception" and the "tyranny of department stores". Both Penguin and Catwoman use the festive season to challenge Gotham's established power structures with carnivalesque traits. Gotham City is dominated by Shreck. Shreck embodies ruthless capitalism concealed behind the "friendly face of a cartoon animal", a subtle critique by Burton of his own experiences with corporate entities like The Walt Disney Company. Batman Returns has been described as a neo-gothic fairy tale that is "more Burton than Batman". Its content was deemed unsuitable for young children, prompting backlash from parents and critics. An editorial in The New York Times warned that the film was "violent, sexually suggestive", featuring scenes where "kids are abandoned, kidnapped, and threatened with death".

The film includes racy dialogue, such as "just the pussy I've been looking for" and "I'd like to fill her void", which angered many parents. This controversy extended to merchandising, with McDonald's receiving numerous complaints about licensed toys and promotional items tied to the film. The resulting outcry over the film's tone and violence highlighted a clash between its dark themes and its marketing to a younger audience.

The film emphasizes loneliness and isolation during Christmastime: Bruce is first shown sitting alone in his vast mansion, inert until the Bat-Signal shines in the sky. While he forms a connection with Kyle, their differences remain insurmountable, and he ends the film as he began it; alone. Critic Todd McCarthy noted that isolation is a recurring theme in much of Burton's work, emphasized in the film's three main characters.

Some contemporary critics argue that while the film is not explicitly antisemitic, it utilizes visual and thematic elements associated with historical Jewish stereotypes. They suggest the Penguin embodies traits such as a "hooked nose, pale face and lust for herring" and is "unathletic and seemingly unthreatening but who, in fact, wants to murder every firstborn child of the gentile community". The character teams with Shreck (a name the critics describe as 'Jewish-sounding') to disrupt Christmas and Christian traditions. According to LAist, the Penguin's exaggerated caricature, assault on holiday customs, and overt biblical symbolism create a "perfect storm" of imagery evoking antisemitic tropes. These critics contend that Burton, in drawing inspiration from the German Expressionist aesthetic, unintentionally referenced a problematic lineage, as some art critics view the Nosferatu (1922) character Count Orlok (portrayed by actor Max Shreck) as an example of a bizarre and monstrous characterization of Jews as the predatory, parasitic "other".

Conversely, Melvin Salberg and Abraham H. Foxman of the Anti-Defamation League argued that reading the film as antisemitic is a misinterpretation that overlooks the filmmakers' intent and distracts from real-world antisemitism. Furthermore, Taussig noted the biblical resonance of the Penguin's infancy, with a baby carriage floating in a river recalling the story of Moses. Visual effects supervisor Robert Skotak explained that the sequence was conceived as a visual descent into the underworld, portraying a sinister baptism, symbolically paralleling the biblical narrative.

== Legacy ==
=== Retrospective reception ===
Despite a mixed initial reception from critics and audiences, Batman Returns has undergone a critical reappraisal in the years since its release and is now considered a classic of the superhero genre. Several publications, such as Variety and The Hollywood Reporter, now rank it among the best Batman and superhero films, with some calling it "the greatest Batman movie ever made". (Note: Attributed to multiple references:) The film is seen as "underrated" and a "series peaking early," with subsequent films failing to live up to its vision.

Burton's artistic choices, which were criticized at the time, are now seen as prescient and ahead of their time. The "darker" and more "bleak" aspects of the film have been re-evaluated in the wake of later, more serious superhero films. Burton noted the irony of the film being deemed 'too dark,' given that later films—including The Dark Knight trilogy (2005–2012) and The Batman (2022)—went even darker. (Note: Attributed to multiple references:) Burton said that while Batman Returns was seen by some as bleak, for him it was a mixture of gothic, playful, kinky, and experimental tones. The Hollywood Reporter notes that the film was "truer to Tim Burton's dark vision than its predecessor". According to The Ringer, the very "fatalistic and noir elements" that Roger Ebert criticized in 1992 are now "the going currency of event movies". Critic Brian Tallerico said that the elements which originally upset critics and audiences are what makes it still "revelatory... It's one of the best and strangest movies of its kind ever made".

Writer Daniel Waters recalled being told that Batman Returns was a "great movie for people who don't like Batman". While the film received criticism for its depiction of Batman killing, Waters defended the choice, arguing that in a film like The Dark Knight (2008), it was not practical for Batman to let the Joker live, knowing he could escape and cause more harm. He believed that the reception to Batman Returns was improving with time, especially after the release of The Batman.

Review aggregator Rotten Tomatoes has an 81% approval rating from reviews by 95 critics, with an average score of 6.9/10. According to the website's critical consensus, "Director Tim Burton's dark, brooding atmosphere, Michael Keaton's work as the tormented hero, and the flawless casting of Danny DeVito as The Penguin and Christopher Walken as, well, Christopher Walken make the sequel better than the first". The film has a score of 68 out of 100 on Metacritic (based on 23 critics), indicating "generally favorable" reviews.

=== Cultural influence ===
The film is widely regarded as an exemplar of the superhero genre's potential for artistic expression. Variety credits the film with helping to legitimize the genre by pairing Keaton's Batman with Burton's distinct and vivid world-building. The Burton Batman films are also credited with establishing the darker, more serious tone that would later define the modern superhero genre of the early 21st century. Publications like Empire and Polygon describe the film as a deeply personal and "unmistakably Burton" work, infused with the same gothic and satirical sensibilities as his earlier films like Beetlejuice and Edward Scissorhands. This approach made the film a "bold, auteur-driven detour" in Batman's cinematic history, contrasting sharply with the camp of the 1960s and the later, more grounded style of The Dark Knight trilogy. Author Jeff Bond called Batman Returns the "first auteur superhero movie" because it allowed Burton to make a film that was his "weird experiment" rather than a strict adaptation. This willingness to ignore traditional comic book elements and sequel hooks in favor of his unique vision helped pave the way for other creative directors, such as Christopher Nolan, Peter Jackson, and Sam Raimi, to helm major franchises. The Batman director Matt Reeves and that film's star Robert Pattinson both called Batman Returns their favorite Batman film. Additionally, director Robert Eggers said that it visually inspired his film Nosferatu (2024).

Pfeiffer's portrayal of Catwoman is widely regarded as a definitive big-screen interpretation of the character, praised not only for her iconic costume but for a performance that brought a unique blend of sexuality, danger, outrageousness, and pathos to the role. (Note: Attributed to multiple references:) Burton called it one of his favorite performances he has ever worked on. While initially hailed as the film's "bright spot" amid a mixed critical reception, the performance is now considered one of the greatest in the superhero genre, credited with taking a comic book character and turning her into a complex, contradictory figure that served as a commentary on the portrayal of women in genre fiction. (Note: Attributed to multiple references:) The role is seen as a "career-making" one that helped audiences forget previous portrayals and cemented Pfeiffer's as the "definitive big-screen Catwoman". Variety argued that Pfeiffer deserved an Academy Award nomination for her performance, and set a benchmark for future portrayals. (Note: Attributed to multiple references:)

Burton recalled that by the time of Batman Returns, studios had begun to talk in terms of "franchises" and marketing, concepts that were still relatively new during production of the 1989 film. The Hollywood Reporter notes that while Batman launched the modern superhero movie, Batman Returns marked a more complex stage in that evolution. With its darker tone, bold characterizations, and extensive marketing tie-ins, the film helped pave the way for the genre's later dominance, even if Burton's approach made that progression a more uneven one. The film's tone and clash with corporate partners like McDonald's, which objected to darker content, prompted Warner Bros. to pivot to the more lighthearted and "campy" style of the Joel Schumacher films. While this was an attempt to create films with more broad, family-friendly appeal, The Ringer wrote that the Schumacher films are now seen as "borderline unwatchable", while Batman Returns is seen as a superior and more enduring cinematic work. In January 2017, one of the iconic Batsuits worn by Keaton in the film sold at auction for $41,250.

Although a summer blockbuster upon its release, Batman Returns has become a holiday film staple due to its winter setting and Christmas iconography. Several publications have listed it among the best alternative Christmas films, noting its themes of loneliness and isolation. (Note: Attributed to multiple references:) It is also identified as the centerpiece of Burton's unofficial Christmas trilogy, bookended by Edward Scissorhands and The Nightmare Before Christmas.

== Sequels ==
Following the reception of Batman Returns, Warner Bros. sought to continue the series without Burton. Although Burton considered making a third film, the studio encouraged him to pursue other projects and he realized they did not want him to return. He was replaced with Joel Schumacher, who was seen as better suited to delivering a more family- and merchandise-friendly sequel. Keaton initially supported the change but eventually left the role, later saying the proposed third film "just wasn't any good, man". Industry reports suggested he also sought a $15 million salary and profit share, though his producing partner Harry Colomby denied money was the issue.

Schumacher's Batman Forever (1995) was financially successful but less well received critically than Batman Returns. Its sequel, Batman & Robin (1997), was a critical and commercial disappointment, often cited as one of the worst blockbuster films ever made, and led to the franchise being placed on hiatus until the reboot Batman Begins (2005).

By the mid-1990s, Burton and Waters were attached to a planned Catwoman film starring Pfeiffer. Burton and Waters held competing visions for the project: Burton wanted to make an intimate black-and-white drama in homage to Cat People (1942), while Waters's script followed Catwoman, suffering from amnesia after the events of Batman Returns, in the Las Vegas-like Oasisburg, where she confronted corrupt male superheroes. The project stalled as Burton and Pfeiffer moved on to other work, and Warner Bros. eventually produced Catwoman (2004), starring Halle Berry, which was widely panned.

Keaton later reprised his Batman in The Flash (2023), and had also filmed scenes for the cancelled Batgirl (2022).
