= Renegade (TV series) =

American television series

- Intertitle
- Genre: Action / Adventure; Drama; Crime
- Created by: Stephen J. Cannell
- Starring: Lorenzo Lamas; Branscombe Richmond; Kathleen Kinmont (seasons 1–4); Stephen J. Cannell; Sandra Ferguson (season 5)
- Theme music composer: Mike Post
- Opening theme: "Theme of Renegade"
- Composer: David Vanacore
- Country of origin: United States
- Original language: English
- No. of seasons: 5
- No. of episodes: 110 (list of episodes)

Production
- Production location: San Diego
- Running time: 43 minutes
- Production companies: Stu Segall Productions; Cannell Entertainment; Renegade IV Enterprises

Original release
- Network: Syndication (seasons 1–4); USA Network (season 5)
- Release: September 19, 1992 – April 4, 1997

Renegade is an American television series that ran for 110 episodes spanning five seasons, first broadcast between September 19, 1992, and April 4, 1997. The series was created by Stephen J. Cannell. Executive producers included Cannell, Stu Segall, Bill Nuss, and Richard C. Okie.

The series stars Lorenzo Lamas as Reno Raines, a police officer who is framed for murder. He goes on the run and joins forces with Native American bounty hunter Bobby Sixkiller, played by Branscombe Richmond. Stephen J. Cannell also had a recurring role as the main villain, crooked police officer Donald "Dutch" Dixon.

== Introduction ==
The show had the following voiceover before every episode, provided by Don LaFontaine, summarizing the plot of the series:

He was a cop, and good at his job, but he committed the ultimate sin—and testified against other cops gone bad. Cops that tried to kill him, but got the woman he loved instead. Framed for murder, now he prowls the badlands... an outlaw hunting outlaws... a bounty hunter... a renegade.

The "Renegade" theme that followed was composed by Mike Post.

== Plot ==
Renegade is the story of San Diego police officer Reno Raines, an ex–Army Ranger, who was called to Bay City, California, by his good friend District Attorney Harry Wells. Harry hired Reno to work undercover, exposing corrupt police officers. In a meeting with Harry Wells and Bay City Police Lieutenant Donald "Dutch" Dixon, Reno explains he has enough evidence to press charges of murder and robbery against Dixon's partner Buzzy Burrell. Not wanting to be implicated in any crimes, Burrell and Dixon break convicted murderer Hogg Adams out of prison to kill Raines. Later that night, Hogg busts into Reno's hotel room, aiming for Reno, but shooting his fiancée, Valerie Prentiss, instead. Hogg flees the hotel and Burrell is seen rushing in to make sure Reno is dead. Dixon arrives moments afterward and kills Burrell with Reno's weapon.

Framed for the murder of Officer Burrell, Reno Raines goes on the run. Dixon sends professional bounty hunter Bobby Sixkiller, a former Marine, after him, but Reno instead saves his life and gains his trust. Bobby realizes that some things were not right with Dixon. Reno then works as a bounty hunter alongside Sixkiller and his sister Cheyenne (Kathleen Kinmont) while searching for Hogg's brother Hound Adams, the one person who can clear his name and bring down Dixon—a witness who, fearing for his own life, will only come forward if Reno kills Dixon, something which he is unwilling to do.

Using the alias "Vince Black", Reno travels the country to look for bounties, whom Bobby turns in for a percentage of the reward money (knowing that Reno would be arrested if he attempted to turn in the criminals himself). He also helps people at the same time and proves the innocence of those he believes to be innocent. On many occasions, law-enforcement officers (and other people) learn who Reno really is, but never turn him in once they trust and believe him. Eventually, Dixon becomes a US federal marshal, giving him the ability to chase Reno with federal assistance.

In season three, Reno goes after Dixon when he learns an $80,000 reward is out for Dixon's capture and arrest for the murder of another Bay City officer. It all turns out to be an elaborate ruse set by Dixon to trap and capture Reno. Reno is arrested and put on trial for Buzzy Burrell's murder. Hound Adams agrees to testify for the defense, for a very large fee, that he knows who really killed Burrell, but when questioned on the witness stand, he implicates Reno, instead, as Burrell's killer. With no evidence to prove that Dixon bribed Hound to lie on the stand, Reno is found guilty of Burrell's murder and sentenced to death. Deciding not to wait for his sentence to be carried out, Reno escapes from prison with the help of a convict who was bribed by Dixon to kill Reno. The convict, chosen by Dixon because he knew he was dying of cancer and had nothing to lose, instead gives the bribe money to his lawyer to hold on to with instructions to send to the police should anything happen to his family.

As the series is coming to an end in season five, Dixon kills his own wife Melissa, and she dies in Reno's arms. She knew what Dixon was doing and was ready to help turn him in. Their adult son, Donald Dixon Jr., believes the newspaper articles (from Dixon Sr.'s testimony) and also goes for Reno. In the final episode, Reno, Bobby, Donald Jr., and Dixon's boss Marshal Jack Hendricks go after Dixon. Dixon shoots and wounds Hendricks and goes on the run. The marshals then put out a reward for his capture. The last scene shows Reno and Bobby discussing whether to go for him now or let him see what it is like to be a wanted fugitive. They choose the former, thus partially ending Reno's predicament while leaving a full conclusion ambiguous.

For many years after the show had aired, it was thought that the story would have been wrapped up in a hypothetical season six, with Dixon on the run and Reno pursuing. However, a "series finale" episode was in fact filmed, where Reno captures Dixon and is fully exonerated for the crimes that Dixon had in fact committed. According to Lorenzo Lamas, the episode was never aired or offered in the final syndication package because every episode—with the exception of the obvious multi-part episodes and the few episodes focused solely on the Reno/Dixon plot—was written as a standalone story that did not have to be viewed in chronological order. It was felt that a "conclusion" would prevent TV series buyers from airing the episodes out of order, which often happens with shows in syndication.

== Cast ==
Actor	Role	Notes
Lorenzo Lamas	Reno Raines / Vincent Black	
Branscombe Richmond	Robert "Bobby" Sixkiller	
Kathleen Kinmont	Cheyenne Phillips	Seasons 1 - 4
Stephen J. Cannell	Donald "Dutch" Dixon	
Sandra Ferguson	Sandy Caruthers	Season 5

== Episodes ==
Season	Episodes	Originally released	
Season	Episodes	First released	Last released
1	22	September 19, 1992	May 15, 1993
2	22	September 18, 1993	May 7, 1994
3	22	September 10, 1994	May 13, 1995
4	22	September 11, 1995	April 29, 1996
5	22	September 13, 1996	April 4, 1997

== Background and production ==
Renegade did not air on one specific American television network but instead was a syndicated series. Stephen J. Cannell created the show in order to capitalize on the burgeoning market for syndicated series. Star Lorenzo Lamas saw it as an opportunity to use his real-life martial arts and motorcycle riding skills in a character role. Fearing that separation from his wife Kathleen Kinmont would hurt their marriage, he persuaded Cannell to give her a co-star role as Cheyenne Phillips. Cannell later recalled that 10-15 actors auditioned for the part of "Dutch" Dixon before Lamas suggested that Cannell play the part himself.

To sell the show, Cannell had Ralph Hemecker direct a montage set to "Wanted Dead or Alive" by Bon Jovi and showed it at a television convention. This montage was later repurposed as the title sequence, albeit with "Wanted Dead or Alive" replaced by a theme composed by Mike Post and a voice-over by Don LaFontaine.

The series was primarily filmed in San Diego, California, and surrounding suburbs. A large number of stunt motorcycles were kept in stock to serve as Reno Raines' Harley-Davidson, but one model was kept polished and undriven for use in what Lamas called "glamour shots".

Though it saw good ratings, the show's first season was panned by critics, and Cannell and Lamas themselves were openly dissatisfied with the scripts. In a late 1993 interview, Lamas elaborated that he felt the writers had sidelined the main plot and regular cast of characters in favor of stories which centered around the guest cast, and also pointed out plot holes in the series formula: "Reno would just show up to where he needed to be, but how did he get there? Why doesn't he leave the country? Why does he hang around and wait to be picked up by a cop who sees his poster?" The recurring character Hound Adams (played by Geoffrey Blake) was introduced in season two in an effort to give the plot direction. Though the show would be on the air for five seasons, it never became a critical success.

Lamas and Kinmont divorced in 1993. According to Lamas, their working relationship deteriorated after he had his new girlfriend, Shauna Sand, cast in a recurring role on the show in 1995, and reportedly Lamas petitioned to have Kinmont fired in response to disparaging remarks she made about Sand on The Howard Stern Show. Rather than being recast, the character of Cheyenne was dropped from the series.

== Home media ==
Anchor Bay Entertainment (under license from the Cannell Studios) released the first three seasons of Renegade on DVD in Region 1 in 2005–2006.

On October 14, 2009, it was announced that Mill Creek Entertainment had acquired the rights to several Stephen J. Cannell series, including Renegade. They subsequently re-released the first two seasons as individual boxed sets.

On October 12, 2010, Mill Creek released Renegade: The Complete Series on DVD in Region 1. The 20-disc set features all 110 episodes of the series on DVD for the first time.

On May 27, 2022, Visual Entertainment released Renegade - The Complete Collection, a special collection featuring all 110 episodes of the series.

DVD name	Ep #	Release date
The Complete First Season	22	January 19, 2010
The Complete Second Season	22	September 14, 2010
The Complete Series (1–5)	110	October 12, 2010; May 27, 2022 (re-release)

== Attempted spin-off ==
The season-two finale, "Carrick O'Quinn", was a backdoor pilot for a Renegade spin-off series with O'Quinn played by Don Michael Paul. In the Carrick O'Quinn episode, O'Quinn was head of a police commando squad, which accidentally blinded a judge named Sarah Jessup, a friend of Reno's, while trying to rescue her from danger. Feeling guilty on making the judge blind, O'Quinn quit the force and helped out the blind judge without revealing who he really was.

The Carrick O'Quinn spin-off series, however, never happened.
