= Jeff McCracken =

American actor

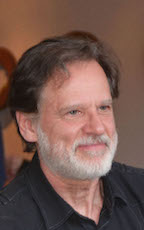
- McCracken in NYC
- Born: September 12, 1952 (age 73); Chicago, Illinois, US
- Occupations: Actor; director; producer; artist
- Years active: 1978–present
- Spouse: Janet Taylor McCracken

Jeff McCracken (born September 12, 1952) is an American actor, director, producer, and artist.

== Early life and education ==
Born in Chicago, McCracken graduated Evanston Township High School in 1970. He served in the United States Air Force during the Vietnam War, where he attained the rank of sergeant. McCracken earned a Bachelor of Arts a degree in creative writing from Goddard College.

== Career ==
After studying at the Neighborhood Playhouse School of the Theatre in New York City he began his acting career on Broadway and off-Broadway, including Breakfast with Les and Bess by Lee Kalcheim. As a member of the Circle Repertory Company he appeared in Confluence by Lanford Wilson, John Bishop and Beth Henley. He also had roles in films, including The One Man Jury (1978), Stranger in Our House (1979), Kent State (1981), Running Brave (1985), and Waiting for the Light (1990). He appeared in television series, Bay City Blues and Hawaiian Heat, as well as guest starring in other series such as: JAG, thirtysomething, The Hitchhiker, St. Elsewhere, The Torkelsons, All is Forgiven, LAX, and Private Eye.

McCracken developed and co-produced the feature film Quiz Show. He was production executive on Pastime.

While at the Walt Disney Company he developed, produced and directed television shows Boy Meets World; Zoe, Duncan, Jack and Jane; Dinosaurs; and You Wish, as well as developing and overseeing production of The Torkelsons, Maybe This Time, Misery Loves Company, Where I Live, and Singer and Sons. In all he has directed over seventy episodes of television, including NYPD Blue, Boy Meets World, Dinosaurs, Zoe, Duncan, Jack and Jane, Still Standing, The Trouble With Normal, Suite Life of Zach and Cody, and Smart Guy.

His artwork has appeared in the magazine The Guide Artists. He taught for several years at Dodge College of Film and Media Arts, becoming an associate professor in 2008, and in 2016 he was a teacher at the New York University Tisch School of the Arts.

== Personal life ==
McCracken lives in Washington, Connecticut, with his wife, Janet Taylor McCracken, who is a food editor. They have three children.

== Filmography ==
=== Film ===
Year	Title	Role	Notes
1978	Paradise Alley	Sailor	Uncredited
1978	The One Man Jury	Billy Joe Kerman	
1979	Yanks	Soldier	Uncredited
1983	Running Brave	Dennis Riley	
1987	Jake's M.O.	Tab Hoberman	
1990	Waiting for the Light	Charlie	

=== Television ===
Year	Title	Role	Notes
1978	Summer of Fear	Mike Gallagher	Television film
1981	Kent State	Bill Schroeder	Television film
1981	Family Reunion	Max Winfield	Television film
1983–1984	Bay City Blues	Vic Kresky	8 episodes
1984	Hawaiian Heat	Andy Senkowski	10 episodes
1986	All Is Forgiven	Lance Tyler	Episode: "Past Perfect"
1986	A Winner Never Quits	Sheldrake	Television film
1986	St. Elsewhere	Mr. Stritch	Episode: "Up and Down"
1987	The Hitchhiker	Allen	Episode: "Joker"
1987, 1988	Private Eye	Eddie / Vinnie Muzak	2 episodes
1989	Thirtysomething	Dave Calloman	Episode: "Payment Due"
1991	The Torkelsons	Reverend Langley Wilson	2 episodes
2004	JAG	Captain Goldman	Episode: "Crash"
2004	LAX	Gavin	Episode: "Finnegan Again, Begin Again"
