= Hawaiian Heat =

American drama television series

- Title screenshot of Hawaiian Heat
- Genre: Drama
- Created by: James D. Parriott
- Starring: Robert Ginty; Jeff McCracken; Tracy Scoggins; Branscombe Richmond; Mako Iwamatsu
- Theme music composer: Tom Scott
- Opening theme: "Goodbye Blues"
- Country of origin: United States
- Original language: English
- No. of seasons: 1
- No. of episodes: 10 + pilot movie

Production
- Executive producer: James D. Parriott
- Producers: Dean Zanetos; Gregory S. Dinallo; Bill Schwartz
- Running time: 60 minutes
- Production companies: James D. Parriott Productions; Universal Television

Original release
- Network: ABC
- Release: September 14 – December 21, 1984

Hawaiian Heat is an American drama television series. It starred Robert Ginty and Jeff McCracken. The series aired on ABC from September 14 to December 21, 1984.

== Overview ==
Robert Ginty and Jeff McCracken played Chicago cops who grew weary of Midwestern winters and quit their jobs on the spur of the moment to become detectives in balmy Hawaii. Their boss at the Honolulu Police Department was played by veteran actor Mako. Many of the episodes were directed by Ivan Dixon. The series was shot in Hawaii. Only eleven episodes aired on ABC, including the pilot movie. Its theme song, "Goodbye Blues," was used by online video producer Brad Jones as the theme for his show "80's Dan."

== Cast ==
- Robert Ginty as Mac Riley
- Jeff McCracken as Andy Senkowski
- Tracy Scoggins as Irene Gorley
- Branscombe Richmond as Harker
- Mako Iwamatsu as Maj. Taro Oshira

Guest stars included Shelley Winters, Brianne Leary, Lorna Patterson, Donna Dixon, Jennifer Holmes, Marta Dubois, Cindy Morgan, Moe Keale, James Sloyan, Fritz Weaver, Tige Andrews, Pat Corley, Manu Tupou, John Fujioka, David Hemmings, Peter Donat, and Charles Rocket.

== Episodes ==
No.	Title	Directed by	Written by	Original release date
Film	"Pilot"	Michael Vejar	James D. Parriott	September 14, 1984
1	"Ice Cream Men"	David Hemmings	James D. Parriott	September 21, 1984
2	"Wave of Controversy"	David Hemmings	Nick Thiel	September 28, 1984
3	"Inherited Trait"	Kim Manners	Gregory S. Dinallo	October 12, 1984
4	"A Different Kind of Justice"	Mike Vejar	Robert W. Gilmer	October 19, 1984
5	"Missing in Hawaii"	Unknown	Unknown	October 26, 1984
6	"Yankees vs. the Cubs"	John Llewellyn Moxey	Nick Thiel	November 2, 1984
7	"Ancient Fires"	Unknown	Unknown	November 9, 1984
8	"Old Dues"	Unknown	Unknown	November 16, 1984
9	"Andy's Mom"	Roy Campanella II	Gregory S. Dinallo	November 23, 1984
10	"Picture Imperfect"	Ivan Dixon	William Schwartz & Robert W. Gilmer	December 21, 1984
