= Running Brave =

1983 film by Donald Shebib

- Directed by: Donald Shebib (credited as D.S. Everett)
- Written by: Henry Bean; Shirl Hendryx
- Based on: life of Billy Mills
- Produced by: Ira Englander
- Starring: Robby Benson; Pat Hingle; Claudia Cron; Jeff McCracken
- Cinematography: François Protat
- Edited by: Peter Zinner
- Music by: Mike Post
- Production company: Englander Productions
- Distributed by: Buena Vista Distribution
- Release date: November 4, 1983
- Running time: 106 minutes
- Language: English
- Budget: $8 million
- Box office: $3 million

Running Brave is a 1983 Canadian biographical sports drama film based on the story of Billy Mills, a member of the Oglala Sioux tribe located in South Dakota. Mills was born on the reservation, and later attended the University of Kansas where he was recruited by the Olympic running team and won the gold medal in the 1964 Tokyo Olympics for the 10,000 meter race. In one of the great upsets in sports history, Mills sprinted from third place for the win. After Mills won gold, he served his community by working to provide scholarships to Native American youth. Mills is still the only American in history to win the Olympic 10,000 meter run. Robby Benson portrays Mills. Pat Hingle and a young Graham Greene also star.

== Plot ==
The story of Billy Mills, the Native American who came from obscurity to win the 10,000-meter long-distance foot-race in the Tokyo Olympics in 1964.

== Billy Mills Background ==
Billy Mills was born on an Indian reservation in South Dakota named Pine Ridge. As Mills grew up, he never knew that his family lived in poverty, and he did not get to experience the life of an American child. Mills would leave the reservation with his family and experience an unsettling amount of racism due to Mills being Native American. As he was growing up, Mills had a stellar school system for his part of the reservation, but he never learned what it was actually like outside of the reservation, and what it meant to live the “American Dream”. As a child, Mills was always an extremely active kid; he would constantly go on long bike rides and swim across lakes and bodies of water with his friends. He claims that most of his cardiovascular strength is attributed to the amount of time he spent running around and building stamina as a child.

When Mills was eight years old, his mother died, and then four years later, when Mills was twelve, his father died as well. Due to this, Mills was sent to a Native American boarding school in Lawrence, Kansas, where he started to run. As Mills ran throughout his high school years, he began to become a standout runner and was able to earn a scholarship to run at the University of Kansas.

As Mills spent four years at the University of Kansas, he experienced many hardships and racial outstrikes against him, because it was extremely uncommon to see a Native American runner. Mills claims that his support system at Kansas was the reason why he found success, and that his teammates and coaching staff always had his back when he faced racial discrimination. When Mills was at Kansas, he was a three-time All-American and helped the Jayhawks win two national championships.

After Mills graduated from Kansas, he joined the United States Marines, hoping to work to be an officer. Although he was enlisting in the Marines, he was still training for the Olympic Games in Tokyo. He went on countless amounts of 25-mile runs and pushed his body to be in the best shape possible. He qualified for the 10,000-meter race and was determined to win gold to prove all the people wrong who said he could not do it.

Mills proved the world wrong and won a gold medal in the 10,000-meter race in dramatic fashion. Up to the present day, Mills is still the only American to win gold in the 10,000-meter. Now, Mills created and works for a non-profit organization named Running Strong for the Native American Youth, where he provides ten $10,000 scholarships to Native American kids to make their dreams and aspirations come true. In 2012, President Barack Obama heard about Mills' story and awarded him a Presidential Citizens Award for his work with the Native American youth.

== Cast ==
Per Turner Classic Movies.

- Robby Benson as Billy Mills
- Pat Hingle as Coach Bill Easton
- Claudia Cron as Pat
- Graham Greene as Eddie
- Wendell Smith as Chris Mitchell
- Jeff McCracken as Dennis Riley
- August Schellenberg as Billy's Father

== Production ==
The film was directed by Donald Shebib, ultimately crediting himself with "D.S. Everett" due to an editing dispute. During the filming of Running Brave, Shebib actively consulted Billy Mills to make sure the film would be historically accurate.

== Reception ==
Audiences polled by CinemaScore gave the film an average grade of "A-" on an A+ to F scale.

Rotten Tomatoes polled Running Brave an 84% on the popcornmeter out of 100%

== See also ==
- List of films about the sport of athletics
