= Claudia Cron =

American actress and model

- Education: Parsons School of Design
- Occupations: Actress, model, artist
- Website: https://www.claudiacron.com/

Claudia Cron is an American actress, model and artist who, while attending the Parsons School of Design, was discovered by Eileen Ford and signed to Ford Models. She appeared in Vogue, and from 1979 to 1986 was under contract with Estee Lauder as the face of their line, Prescriptives. Cron has had many covers and been photographed for Vogue, Harper's Bazaar, Brides, French Vogue, Glamour, Grazia, Mademoiselle, Modern Bride, Redbook, Self, Votre Beauté, and Working Woman. Photographers Cron has worked with include Bruce Weber, Victor Skrebneski, Arthur Elgort, Patrick DeMarchalier, Irving Penn, and Albert Watson.

Cron also acted, appearing in notable films such as Stir Crazy, the 1982 film Hit and Run, and Diner, as well as Soup for One, Running Brave and Aspen Extreme. She guest-starred on several television shows including L.A. Law, Hill Street Blues, Cheers, Remington Steele, and Magnum P.I.. Additionally, Cron acted in many movies for television such as Obsessed with a Married Woman with Tim Matheson and Sunday Drive with Tony Randall and Carrie Fisher.

Cron is currently an exhibiting artist.
