= Branscombe Richmond =

American actor (born 1955)

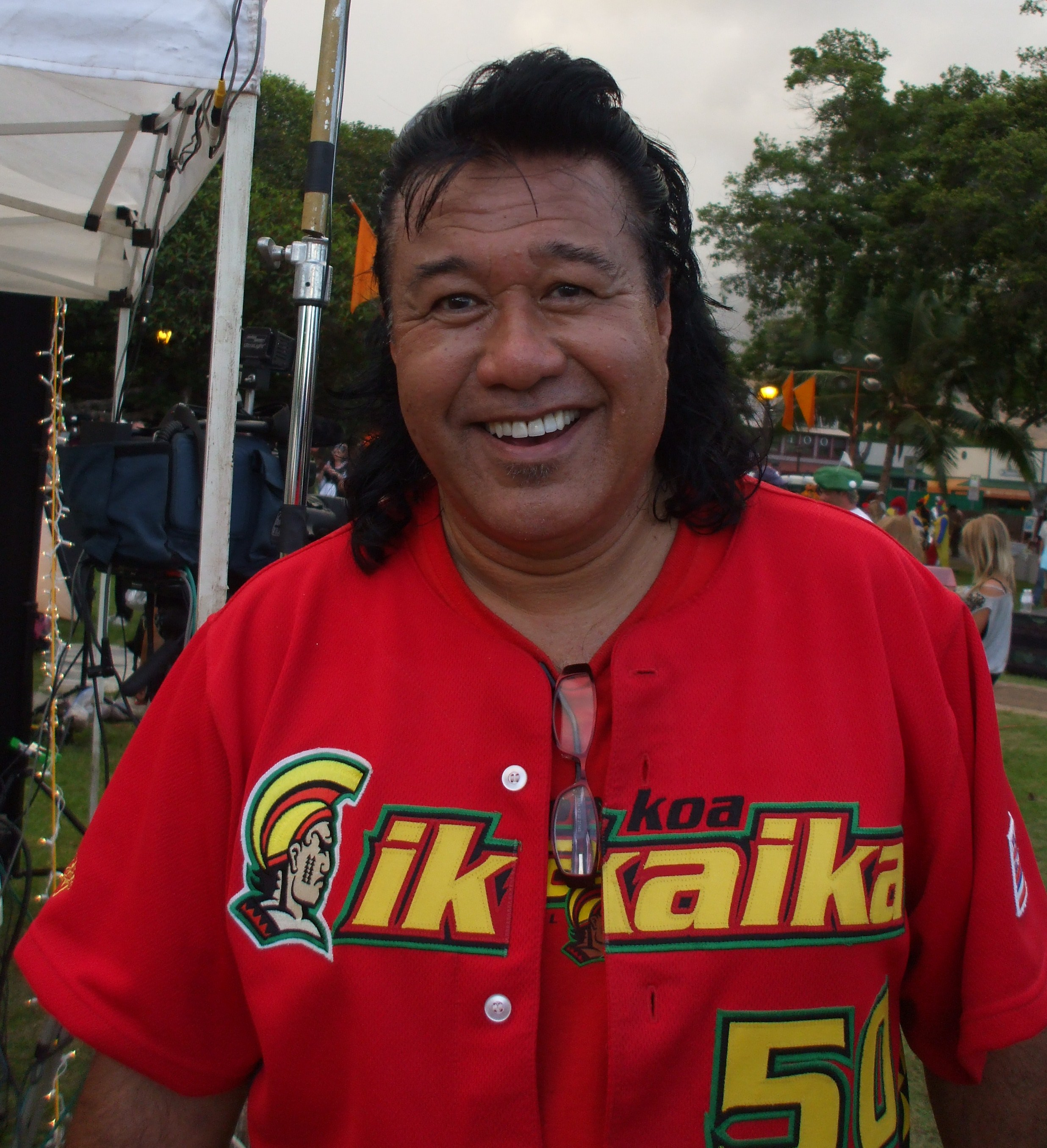
- Richmond at the Halloween in Lahaina festivities in October 2011
- Born: Branscombe Leo Charles Richmond; August 8, 1955 (age 71); Los Angeles, California, U.S.
- Occupation: Actor
- Years active: 1974–present
- Children: 1

Branscombe Richmond (born August 8, 1955) is an American character actor and stuntman. He is known for his starring role of Bobby Sixkiller on the American syndicated drama series Renegade (1992–1997) and for his starring roles on the television series Hawaiian Heat (1984) and Heart of the City (1986–1987). Richmond has appeared in numerous films and has guest starred on many television series.

== Life and career ==
Richmond is of Native Hawaiian, Tahitian, French, English, and Spanish descent. He grew up in Encino, California.

Richmond appeared as a policeman named Harker in the pilot and all 10 episodes of Hawaiian Heat in the fall of 1984 on ABC. In the fall of 1986, he appeared as another policeman, Sergeant Luke Halui, in all 13 episodes of Heart of the City.

One of Richmonds' best known and prominent television roles was in the 1990s hit syndicated television series Renegade as Bobby Sixkiller. He also appeared in a minor role as Moki in the pilot episode of Magnum, P.I. before the role was taken over by another actor. His many other television appearances include in series such as Jake and the Fatman, Vega$, MacGyver, Walker, Texas Ranger, The A-Team and The Highwayman. He has appeared in Star Trek III: The Search for Spock, Action Jackson, Licence to Kill, Hard to Kill, Journey 2: The Mysterious Island, Aces: Iron Eagle III, Harley Davidson and the Marlboro Man, Christopher Columbus: The Discovery, and in The Scorpion King, as Mathayus's half-brother.

Richmond was inducted into the Motorcycle Hall of Fame in 2003. Grindcore band Anal Cunt paid tribute to him in a track called "Branscombe Richmond" on their album I Like It When You Die. He voiced the character Gibraltar in Apex Legends.

He also has his own band, Branscombe Richmond and the Renegade Posse, which he formed in 1989. The band tours the United States when Richmond is not working on television or film, and it also plays at corporate functions..

In May 2023, Richmond and his son Fairai directed a children's film entitled Kangaroo Kids in southern Kentucky. In 2025, he appeared in the series Chief of War, which details the wars between Hawai'i's kingdoms in the 1700s.

== Filmography ==
Key
†	Denotes films that have not yet been released

=== Film ===
Year	Title	Role	Notes
1977	The Kentucky Fried Movie	Guard	Film debut role; Segment: "A Fistful of Yen"
1977	The Chicken Chronicles	Mark	
1979	Kill the Golden Goose	Mahuna	
1979	The Fish That Saved Pittsburgh	Winston Running Hawk	
1984	Star Trek III: The Search for Spock	Klingon Gunner #2	
1985	Commando	Vega	
1986	Never Too Young to Die	Minkie's Partner	
1987	No Safe Haven	Manuel	
1987	Best Seller	Longshoreman #1	
1987	The Hidden	Roberts	
1988	Action Jackson	Poolroom Thug #2	
1988	The New Adventures of Pippi Longstocking	Fridolf	
1988	Hero and the Terror	Victor	
1989	Licence to Kill	Barrelhead Bar Patron	
1989	L.A. Bounty	Willis	
1989	Cage	"Diablo"	
1990	Hard to Kill	Detective Max Quentero	
1991	The Perfect Weapon	The Bartender	
1991	Trabbi Goes to Hollywood	Bouncer	
1991	Harley Davidson and the Marlboro Man	Big Indian	
1991	The Taking of Beverly Hills	Benitez	
1991	Curly Sue	Albert	
1991	Grand Canyon	Ace Cop	
1992	Aces: Iron Eagle III	Rebel Rapist	
1992	Batman Returns	Terrifying Clown #1	
1992	Death Ring	Mr. Cross	Direct-to-video film
1992	Christopher Columbus: The Discovery	Indian Chieftain	
1992	Inside Edge	Henderson	
1992	Nemesis	Mexican Man	
1992	Sweet Justice	Biker	
1993	Sunset Grill	Gang Member #1	
1993	DaVinci's War	Don Ho	
1993	CIA II: Target Alexa	General Mendosa	
1994	Hard Vice	Tony	
1995	To the Limit	Don Williams	
2002	The Scorpion King	Jesup	
2004	Black Cloud	Peter	
2005	Angels with Angles	El Capitan	
2008	Forgetting Sarah Marshall	Keoki	Cameo role
2010	Taken by Force	Dakota	
2011	Just Go with It	The Bartender	
2011	Soul Surfer	Ben Aipa	
2011	Born to Ride	Dean	
2012	Journey 2: The Mysterious Island	Tour Guide	
2016	Mike and Dave Need Wedding Dates	Kalani / BBQ Chef	
2016	Moana	not role	Voiceover
2017	Maui	The Moke	
2018	The City of Gold	Shiniki	
2019	Las Vegas Vietnam: The Movie	Senator	
2020	Disturbing the Peace	"Big Dog"	
2020	The Unhealer	Red Elk	
2021	Finding ʻOhana	Kimo	
2021	Angel by Thursday	Rosales	
2022	Paradise City	Senator Kane	
2023	Kangaroo Kids	Kodiak	Also producer
2026	The Wrecking Crew	Mr. K	

=== Television ===
Year	Title	Role	Notes
1974	Planet of the Apes	Extra	Episode: "The Horse Race"
1976	Lanigan's Rabbi	not role	Episode: Pilot
1976–1977	The Six Million Dollar Man	Thug / Basketball Player	2 episodes
1977	Emergency!	Ice Skating Clown	Episode: "Insanity Epidemic"
1978	The Bionic Woman	Security Guard	Episode: "The Pyramid"
1978	Three on a Date	Allen Lunalilo	Television film
1978	Deathmoon	Vince Tatupu	Television film
1979	The Rockford Files	Frankie Reva	Episode: "Paradise Cove"
1980	Hart to Hart	Gunman In jeep	Episode: "The Raid"
1980	Waikiki	Walter Kaamanu	Television film
1980	Here's Boomer	Burglar	Episode: "Private Eye"
1980	Vegas	Maker	Episodes: "Aloha, You're Dead: Part 1 and 2"
1980–1987	Magnum, P.I.	Moki / Henchman / "Smitty" / Gerald Akoa	5 episodes
1981	Charlie's Angels	Bob Ahuna	Episode: "Hula Angels"
1982	The Legend of Walks Far Woman	Big Lake	Television film
1983	Tales of the Gold Monkey	Paul	Episode: "A Distant Shout of Thunder"
1983	Falcon Crest	Ernie	Episode: "Chameleon Charades"
1984	Automan	Johnson	Episode: "Ships in the Night"
1984	Lottery!	Emcee	Episode: "Honolulu: 3 - 2 = 1"
1984	The Mystic Warrior	Miyaca	Television film
1984	Hawaiian Heat	Harker	Television film
1984	Too Close for Comfort	Papuli Kanakahakakamoki	Episode: "Hawaii Five-8"
1984	Mickey Spillane's Mike Hammer	Peter Sky Horse	Episode: "Warpath"
1984	Matt Houston	Motorcyclist	Episode: "Death Stalk"
1984	Hawaiian Heat	Harker	Main role
1984–1985	Riptide	James Sutherland's Henchman / Brawler / Balmer's Henchman / Stunt Actor	4 episodes
1985	Kids Don't Tell	Pool Player	Television film
1985	Cover Up	"Luck"	Episode: "Passions"
1985	Misfits of Science	Man	Episode: "Lost Link"
1985	Airwolf	Jimmy Oshiro / Alonzo Delomo's Man	2 episodes
1985–1986	Knight Rider	Henchman	2 episodes
1985–1986	The A-Team	Ifker's Henchman / Blair	2 episodes
1985–1988	MacGyver	Grade / The Guard	2 episodes
1986	Crazy Like a Fox	Jack Tremaine	Episode: "Just Another Fox in the Crowd"
1986	T. J. Hooker	The Bartender	Episode: "Blood Sport"
1986	Rowdies	1st Driver	Television film
1986	The Magical World of Disney	Johnson	Episode: "Sunday Drive"
1986	The Greatest American Hero	Bar Patron	Episode: "The Greatest American Heroine"
1986–1987	Heart of the City	Sergeant Luke Halui	Main role
1986–1988	Hunter	Richard Wing Boysquad / Thug / Closkey	3 episodes
1987	CBS Summer Playhouse	Lance Kendall	Episode: "Doctors Wilde"
1987	The New Gidget	Native Chief	Episode: "Gilligidge Island"
1987	The Highwayman	Geronimo	Episode: "The Highwayman"
1987	Private Eye	Nickey Whitehorse	Episode: "War Buddy"
1987	Beauty and the Beast	Thug	Episode: "Siege"
1987	Sledge Hammer!	Rico	Episode: "Hammer Hits the Rock"
1987–1990	Jake and the Fatman	Bill Kulakai / Lester Trent / "Koko"	3 episodes
1988	Ohara	Kenji / Yakuza Thug #2	Episode: "What's in a Name"
1988	Houston Knights	Benny Figueroa	Episode: "Love Hurts"
1988	Night Court	Ahkpa	Episodes: "Danny Got His Gun: Part 2 and 3"
1988	Paradise	Howard	Episode: "The News from St. Louis"
1989	Baywatch: Panic at Malibu Pier	Lifeguard	Television film
1989	Island Son	Johnny "Johnny K"	Episode: original Pilot
1989	Dragnet	Andy Remo	Episode: "Automated Muggings"
1989	Life Goes On	Dave Gage	Episode: "Call of the Wild"
1990	Alien Nation	Laurence Haney	Episode: "Partners"
1990	El Diablo	Dancing Bear	Television film
1990	Max Monroe: Loose Cannon	Man #1	Episode: "Flashback"
1990	Snow Kill	Loomis	Television film
1991	L.A. Law	Dr. Landale	Episode: "Dances with Sharks"
1991	Pros and Cons	Security Guard	Episode: "Fire and Ice"
1992	Raven	Tino, The Bouncer	Episode: "The Death of Sheila"
1992	Ring of the Musketeers	Gus	Television film
1992–1997	Renegade	Bobby Sixkiller	Main role
1993	Jericho Fever	FBI Agent	Television film
1994	The Corpse Had a Familiar Face	Rodriguez	Television film
1997	Hawaii Five-O	Napoleon DeCastro	Television film
1997	An Early Grave	Herbert Venerable	Television film
1998	Walker, Texas Ranger	Deputy George Black Fox	Episode: "Tribe"
1998	Air America	Fantini	Episode: "High Noon at Costa Perdida"
2000	Nash Bridges	not role	Episode: "Grave Robbers" (uncredited)
2001	18 Wheels of Justice	Green Richard	Episode: "The Cage"
2001	70th Annual Hollywood Christmas Parade	Himself	Television film
2002	Power Rangers Wild Force	Mr. Enrile	Episode: "A Father's Footsteps"
2003	Tremors	Harlowe Winnemucca	3 episodes
2003	Touch 'Em All McCall	not role	Television film
2004	Hawaii	not role	Episode: "Hawaiian Justice"
2004	Charmed	Fierce Demon	Episode: "A Call to Arms"
2005	Desperate Housewives	Inmate #3	Episode: "My Heart Belongs to Daddy"
2005	Joey	Ray	Episode: "Joey and the Bachelor Thanksgiving"
2007	Eyes	Don Brown	Episode: "Burglary"
2010	Cutthroat	The Assassin	Television film
2011	Hawaii Five-0	Saloni	Episode: "Powa Maka Moana"
2016	Surf Break Hotel	Mr. Kahele	Television film
2016	Roadies	Puna	7 episodes
2016–2019	Chicago Med	Keoni	5 episodes
2018	Runaway Romance	Alvey Newman	Television film
2019	Blackwater	Randy Dawson	Episode: Pilot
2022	The Walls Are Watching	Theodore	Television film
2022	NCIS: Hawaii	Maleko Ioane	Episode: "Sudden Death"
2025	Chief of War	King Kalaniʻōpuʻu	Episodes: "City of Flowers, Part I & II"

=== Video games ===
Year	Title	Role	Notes
2019	Apex Legends	Gibraltar	Voiceover
