= Graeme Newman =

American criminologist and professor

Graeme R. Newman is an American scholar of criminal justice and Distinguished Teaching Professor at University at Albany. He is a recipient of J. Francis Finnegan Memorial Prize in Criminology.

Newman is the vice president of Center for Problem Oriented Policing and pioneered the establishment of the United Nations Crime and Justice Information Network. He is known for his research on crime prevention.

== Books ==
- Newman, G. (1976). Comparative Deviance: Perception and Law in Six Cultures.
- Newman, G. (1978), The Punishment Response.
- Newman, G. (1995), Just And Painful: A Case for Corporal Punishment of Criminals.
- Howard, G. and Newman, G. (2001), Varieties of Comparative Criminology, Brill
- Newman. G. and Clarke, R. V. (2003). Superhighway Robbery: Preventing E-Commerce Crime.
- McNally, M. M., & Newman, G. R., (2008). Perspectives on Identity Theft.
- Newman, G. (2018), Punishment and Privilege, 2nd ed. Independently published
