= Mon Bel Ami Wedding Chapel =

- Former names: Silver Bell Wedding Chapel

General information
- Type: Chapel
- Address: 607 S Las Vegas Blvd; Las Vegas, NV 8910
- Coordinates: 36°09′47″N 115°08′39″W

Website
- www.monbelami.com

Mon Bel Ami Wedding Chapel is a wedding chapel located on Las Vegas Boulevard in Las Vegas, Nevada, USA. Established in 2003, the chapel is a modern renovation of the Silver Bell Wedding Chapel which was built in the 1950s. The venue hosts weddings, vow renewals, commitment ceremonies, same-sex weddings and wedding receptions for couples traveling to Las Vegas to get married from all over the world.

== History ==
Built in the 1950s, the venue was host to hundreds of thousands of weddings as the Silver Bell Wedding Chapel, including the celebrity weddings of Burt Bacharach and Angie Dickenson in 1965 and Rodney Dangerfield to Joan Child in 1993. Jim Duszynski became owner in the 1960s and his father Leonard designed the famous neon wedding bells. The venue was also featured in the television movie Saved by the Bell: Wedding in Las Vegas and the film Lost in America. In 2002 a fire damaged most of the building. It was sold and renovated under new ownership and re-opened as Mon Bel Ami Wedding Chapel in 2003.

== See also ==
- List of wedding chapels in Las Vegas
