= Wee Kirk o' the Heather =

Wee Kirk o' the Heather may refer to:

- Wee Kirk o' the Heather (Forest Lawn Memorial Park, Glendale)
- Wee Kirk o' the Heather (Las Vegas)
