= A Little White Wedding Chapel =

Wedding chapel in Las Vegas, Nevada

Coordinates: 36°9′19″N 115°8′58.9″W

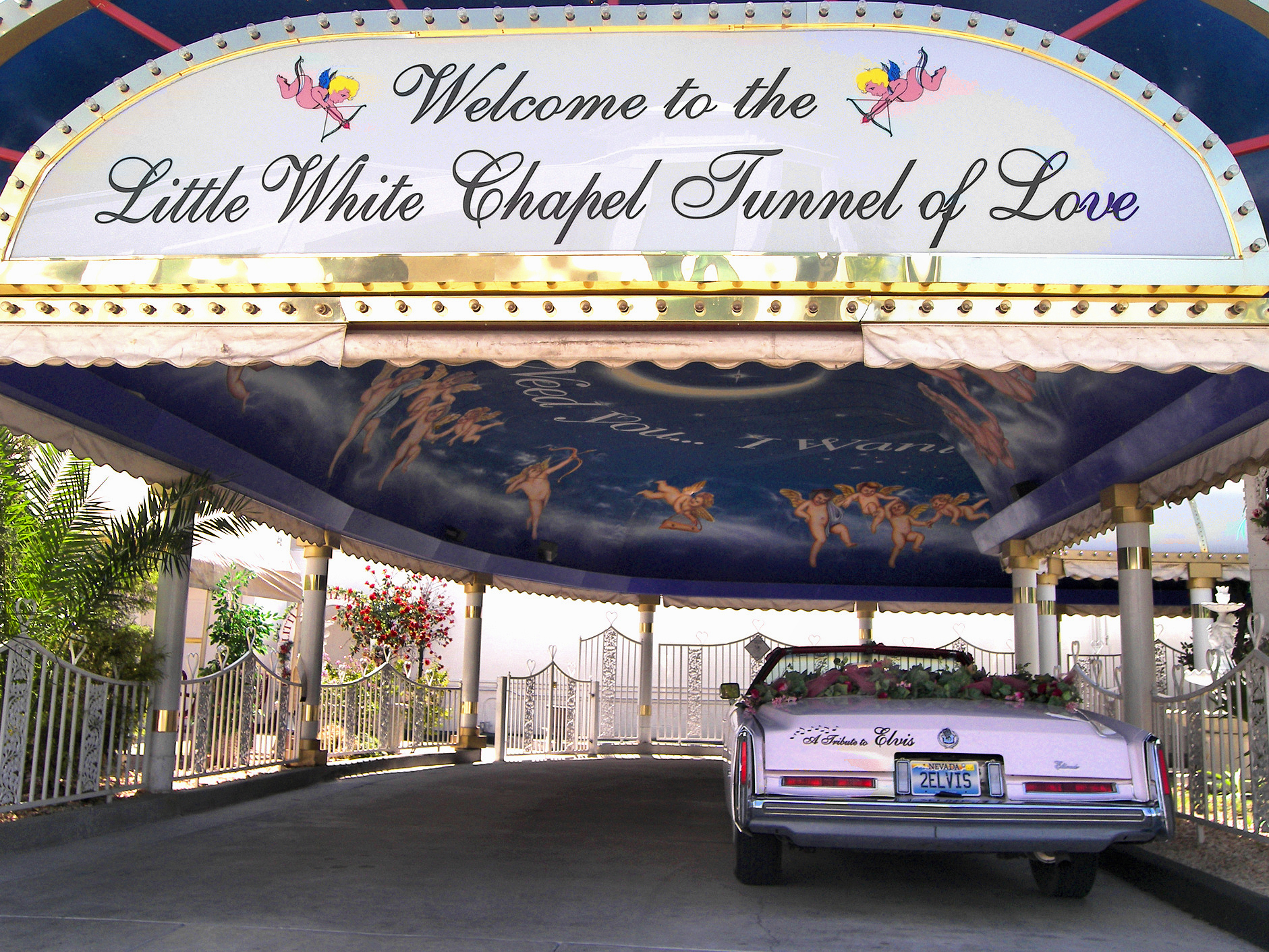
A Little White Chapel Drive-Thru Tunnel of Vows.

A Little White Wedding Chapel is a chapel in Las Vegas, Nevada. It is notable as the site of many quick celebrity weddings; famously, the chapel offers a "Drive-Thru Tunnel of Vows" for quick, largely unplanned marriages. The chapel was built and opened in 1954 by Arvid and Neva Barnhart.

Charolette Richards bought the chapel in 1981. She came into the wedding business through marriage with Merle Richards, owner of Little Church of the West. Merle and Charolette Richards together opened Algiers' Little Church of the West in 1968. The couple later divorced, and Charolette went into business on her own with Little White Chapel. She has presided over the marriages of Frank Sinatra, Judy Garland, Mickey Rooney, Michael Jordan, Dame Joan Collins, Britney Spears, Bruce Willis and Demi Moore. Mrs. Richards sold the chapel in 2022 to Cliff Evarts and Melody Willis-Williams.

Similarly named Las Vegas wedding chapels, such as The Little Church of the West, The Little Chapel by the Courthouse, and the Chapel of the Flowers are often confused with A Little White Wedding Chapel. The Little Chapel by the Courthouse was also owned by We've Only Just Begun Inc. (Charolette Richards).

== Notable weddings ==
- Paul Newman and Joanne Woodward (January 29, 1958)
- Judy Garland and Mark Herron (November 14, 1965)
- Frank Sinatra and Mia Farrow (July 19, 1966)
- Patty Duke and Michael Tell (June 26, 1970)
- Joan Collins and Peter Holm (November 3, 1985)
- Bruce Willis and Demi Moore (November 21, 1987)
- Michael Jordan and Juanita Vanoy (September 2, 1989)
- David Faustino and Andrea Elmer (January 24, 2000)
- Natalie Maines and Adrian Pasdar (June 24, 2000)
- Stone Cold Steve Austin and Debra Marshall (September 13, 2000)
- Eva Longoria and Tyler Christopher (January 20, 2002)
- Britney Spears and Jason Allen Alexander (January 3, 2004)
- Henry Thomas and Marie Zielcke (May 10, 2004)
- Rufus Hound and Beth Johnson (April 2007)
- Pamela Anderson and Rick Salomon (October 6, 2007)
- Peaches Geldof and Max Drummey (August 5, 2008)
- Christina Milian and The-Dream (September 4, 2009)
- Jordan Chan and Cherrie Ying (February 14, 2010)
- Nik Richie and Shayne Lamas (April 18, 2010)
- Charlie Brooker and Konnie Huq (July 26, 2010)
- Russell Peters and Monica Diaz (August 20, 2010)
- Sinéad O'Connor and Barry Herridge (December 8, 2011)
- Eugenia Martínez de Irujo, 12th Duchess of Montoro and Narcís Rebollo Melció (November 17, 2017)
- Joe Jonas and Sophie Turner (May 1, 2019)
- David Dobrik and Lorraine Nash (May 16, 2019)
- Ben Affleck and Jennifer Lopez (July 17, 2022)

== In popular culture ==
The chapel has been featured on such TV shows as WWE Raw, Supernatural, Friends and Good Morning America. Michael Ross and Naomi Defensor, two cast members on the 2011 season of The Real World: Las Vegas, participated in a mock wedding at the Chapel during the June 1, 2011 season finale of that series. The wedding scene depicted in the 2025 Oscar-winning film Anora was shot at A Little White Wedding Chapel in March 2023.

== See also ==
- List of wedding chapels in Las Vegas
