= Las Vegas weddings =

Las Vegas weddings refers to wedding ceremonies held in Las Vegas, Nevada. The London Daily Herald described Las Vegas as the "Marriage Capital of the World" in 1953, a title which has remained since. It has held the title because of the ease of acquiring a marriage license and the minimal costs involved in having a wedding in Las Vegas. The city continues to be known as a popular wedding destination for the same reasons, but also as a result of the various types of weddings available.

== Marriage license ==
Nevada marriage licenses are considered notoriously easy to get; there is no blood test or required waiting period. Las Vegas has streamlined the process further. Once an application for a marriage license is completed online and presented to the marriage license bureau in-person along with $102.00 and a government-issued photo identification, a marriage license may be obtained within minutes until midnight every night. The ease of getting married was historically a deliberate choice of Nevada lawmakers to promote tourism.

Within one year of receipt of the marriage license a wedding ceremony must be performed in order to have a legal union, and marriages are legal and binding throughout the United States under the Full Faith and Credit Clause, as well as in most other countries.

Wedding licenses issued
Year	Clark County	United States	Clark County %
1996	104,789	2,344,000	4.5
1997	109,378	2,384,000	4.6
1998	108,717	2,244,000	4.8
1999	114,465	2,251,000	5.1
2000	120,629	2,376,000	5.1
2001	121,547	2,345,000	5.2
2002	119,759	2,254,000	5.3
2003	114,544	2,187,000	5.2
2004	125,967	2,224,000	5.7
2005	121,282	2,230,000	5.4
2006	112,531	2,160,000	5.2

== Wedding venues ==
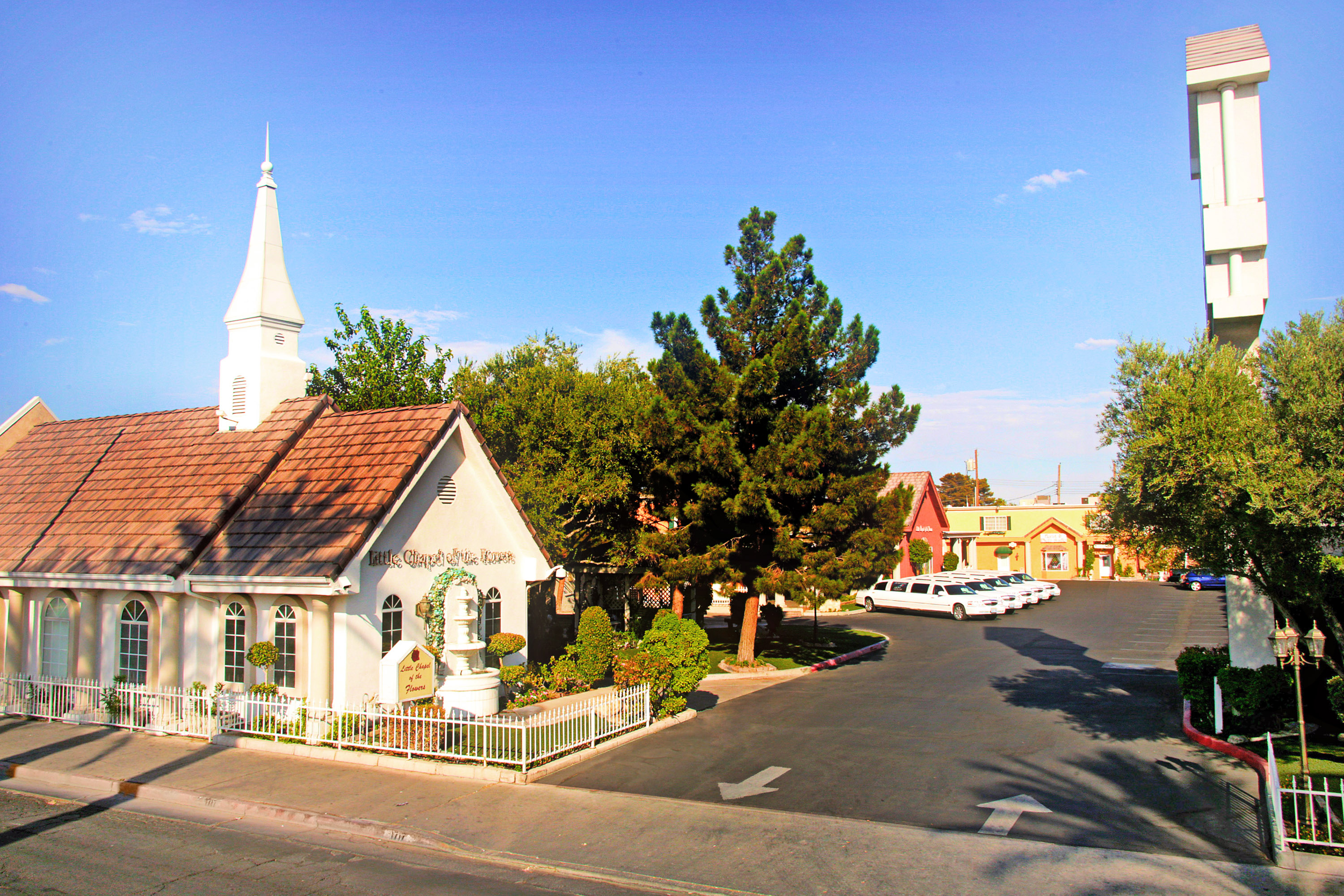
Chapel of the Flowers, one of the many wedding chapels in Las Vegas

There are numerous options for wedding ceremonies in Las Vegas, ranging from large-scale, expensive ceremonies and accompanying receptions to very brief, simple "couple only" events. One of the least expensive options, costing under one hundred dollars, is to marry at the Office of Civil Marriages.

Most weddings performed in Las Vegas may be a civil or religious service depending upon the wedding venue selected.

Most of the city's major hotels have wedding chapels and many of the local restaurants offer wedding ceremonies. The major resorts on the Las Vegas Strip can accommodate very large weddings or smaller, more intimate ceremonies. Weddings may also be performed in one of the local churches, synagogues, at one of the many golf courses, or at a free standing wedding chapel. Drive-thru weddings are also available.

=== Wedding chapels ===
The majority of the newer wedding chapels are located on the Las Vegas Strip. A local law in the 1970s made it impossible to build a free standing wedding chapel on the Las Vegas Strip. The older wedding chapels will be found downtown.

== Themed weddings ==
Many chapels also offer themed weddings. Common themes include Hawaiian, Fairy Tale, Star Trek, Star Wars, Gothic, Halloween, and weddings with an Elvis impersonator or Michael Jackson impersonator. The Tropicana has offered a "rock star" wedding officiated by former Quiet Riot frontman Paul Shortino.

== See also ==
- A Little White Wedding Chapel
- Chapel of the Flowers
- Graceland Wedding Chapel
