= Mark Scott Ricketts =

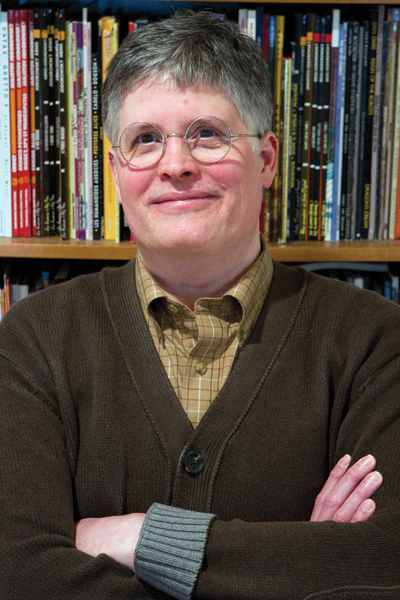
- Born: Mark Ricketts Stuttgart, Arkansas
- Areas: Writer artist
- Notable works: Nowheresville GN; Whiskey Dickel, International Cowgirl GN; Moose Mountain Comics; Lazarus Jack; Night Trippers
- Awards: 2000 Klasky Csupo Screenwriting Award

Mark Ricketts (born December 9, 1955) is an American comic book writer, illustrator and cartoonist. He has worked for a variety of publishers including McGraw-Hill, Caliber Comics, Chaos! Comics, Mojo Press, Marvel Comics, Dark Horse Comics, Moonstone Books and Image Comics. He won the 2000 Klasky Csupo screenwriting award for his teleplay "Whiskey Dickel, Int'l Cowgirl."

== Biography ==
Mark Ricketts was born in 1955 in Stuttgart, Arkansas to the propretior of a fast food restaurant called The Dairy Creme.

He attended Arkansas State University in Jonesboro, Arkansas where he studies painting under Roger Calisle, a landscape artist. Here he met musician and songwriting partner Almis Zdanius. In 1982, Ricketts moved to Chicago to form a band. His collaboration with Zdanius was explored in a series of podcasts entitled "Songs From the Matted Shag". During his time in Chicago, Ricketts created illustrations for Playboy magazine and various other publications. While providing spot illustrations for Playboy's music page, Ricketts befriended underground cartoonist Skip Williamson who encouraged him to pursue a career in comics.

His big break came in 1990 when Caliber Comics published his first book, Warpwalking.

== Personal life ==
Ricketts was married at the Graceland Wedding Chapel on Valentine's Day in Las Vegas in 1991. According to his website, his wife walked down the aisle wearing a red dress and carrying black flowers while an Elvis impersonator sang a slow version of "Viva Las Vegas."

Ricketts and his wife, Mary, moved from Illinois to Maine in 2006 after she saw some images of the state in a book.

== Comics ==
Ricketts got his break in 1990, when Gary Reed of Caliber Comics agreed to publish his first book "Warpwalking". Ricketts created many original comics under the Caliber banner, but dropped out of the comics scene in 1996 to pursue other interests. In 1999, longtime friend Brian Michael Bendis encouraged Ricketts to continue making comics and showed his work to Jim Valentino, then Image Comics publisher. In 2000, Image published the graphic novel Nowheresville– a mystery set in 1950s Greenwich Village that combines Beat Generation culture with hard-boiled pulp crime fiction.

Ricketts created many original graphic novels at Image, including Dioramas which was optioned by Venture Studios. He also created a graphic novel for Dark Horse entitled Lazarus Jack and wrote four issues of The Invincible Iron Man for the Avengers Disassembled event. Over the years, Ricketts has written stories illustrated by Mike Hawthorne, Sean Phillips, Tony Harris, Scott Kolins, Brian Michael Bendis, Eric Wight, Neil Gaiman, Micah Farritor, Mitch O'Connell, Leanne Buckley, Andy Kuhn, Phil Hester, Alex Ross, Mike Mignola, David Mack, Michael Lark, Terry LaBan, Guy Davis, Jim Calafiore, Jay Geldhof, Jill Thompson, Galen Showman, Andrew Robinson and Tim Bradstreet.

== Bibliography ==
=== Caliber Comics ===
- Deadworld Vol. 2 #2 (writer/artist "Oliver Twisted")
- Warpwalking #1-5 (writer/artist)
- Negative Burn #9-13 (writer/artist "Twilight People")
- Negative Burn #25 (writer "The Sad Case of Professor Woodbury")
- Negative Burn - #33 (writer/artist "Nowheresville")
- Negative Burn #37 (artist "Alan Moore Songbook: City of Lights")
- Book of Twilight GN (writer/artist)
- Nowheresville #1 (writer/artist)
- Nowheresville: Death By Starlight #1-4 (writer/artist)
- Nowheresville: The History of Cool (writer/artist)
- International Cowgirl #1 & 2 (writer/artist)
- Thumbscrew (writer/artist "There Goes the Neighborhood")
- The Lost #1-2 (writer/artist for the flashback sequences)
- High Caliber GN (writer/artist) "Dead Eyes"
- Sinergy GN (writer/artist "level ?")
- Mister X vol. 3 #2-4 (cover artist)

=== Chaos! Comics ===
- The Lost #3 (pencils)

=== Mojo Press ===
- Occurrences: The Illustrated Ambrose Bierce (artist "An Imperfect Conflagration", "A Revolt of the Gods" )

=== Dark Horse Comics ===
- Urban Legends #1 (artist/co-writer "The Burn Man")
- Tales of the Fear Agent Vol 1 (writer "To Serve Man")
- The Dark Horse Book of Witchcraft (writer "Golden Calf Blues")
- Hellboy: Weird Tales Vol. 2/ Hellboy: The Theater of the Dead and other stories ( writer "Curse of the Haunted Doily")
- Lazarus Jack GN (writer)

=== Image Comics ===
- Nowheresville GN (writer/artist)
- Whiskey Dickel, Int'l Cowgirl GN (Spot illustrations)
- Dioramas GN (writer)
- Night Trippers GN (writer)
- Put The Book Back On The Shelf: A Belle and Sebastian Anthology (writer "Dear Catastrophe Waitress")
- Four Letter Worlds (writer "Fear")
- 24/Seven Vol 2 Anthology (writer "Bugged")
- The Wicked West II Anthology (writer "Whiskey Dream")
- Brian Michael Bendis' Total Sell Out (writer "Whole Thing Wrong")

=== Moonstone ===
- Belle Starr #1-2 (writer)

=== Marvel Comics ===
- The Invincible Iron Man #86-89 (writer)

=== Islandport Press ===
- A Flatlander's Guide to Maine (writer/illustrator)
- Adventures in Vacationland (writer/illustrator)

Preceded by John Jackson Miller	Iron Man writer 2004	Succeeded by Warren Ellis
