= Graceland Wedding Chapel =

Las Vegas wedding chapel

Coordinates: 36°09′45.59″N 115°08′40.93″W

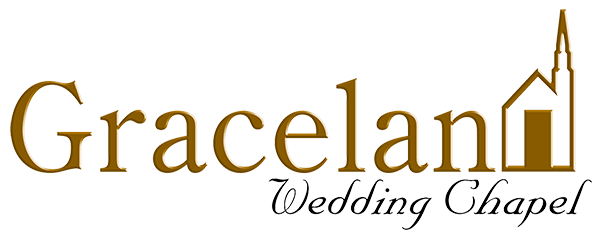

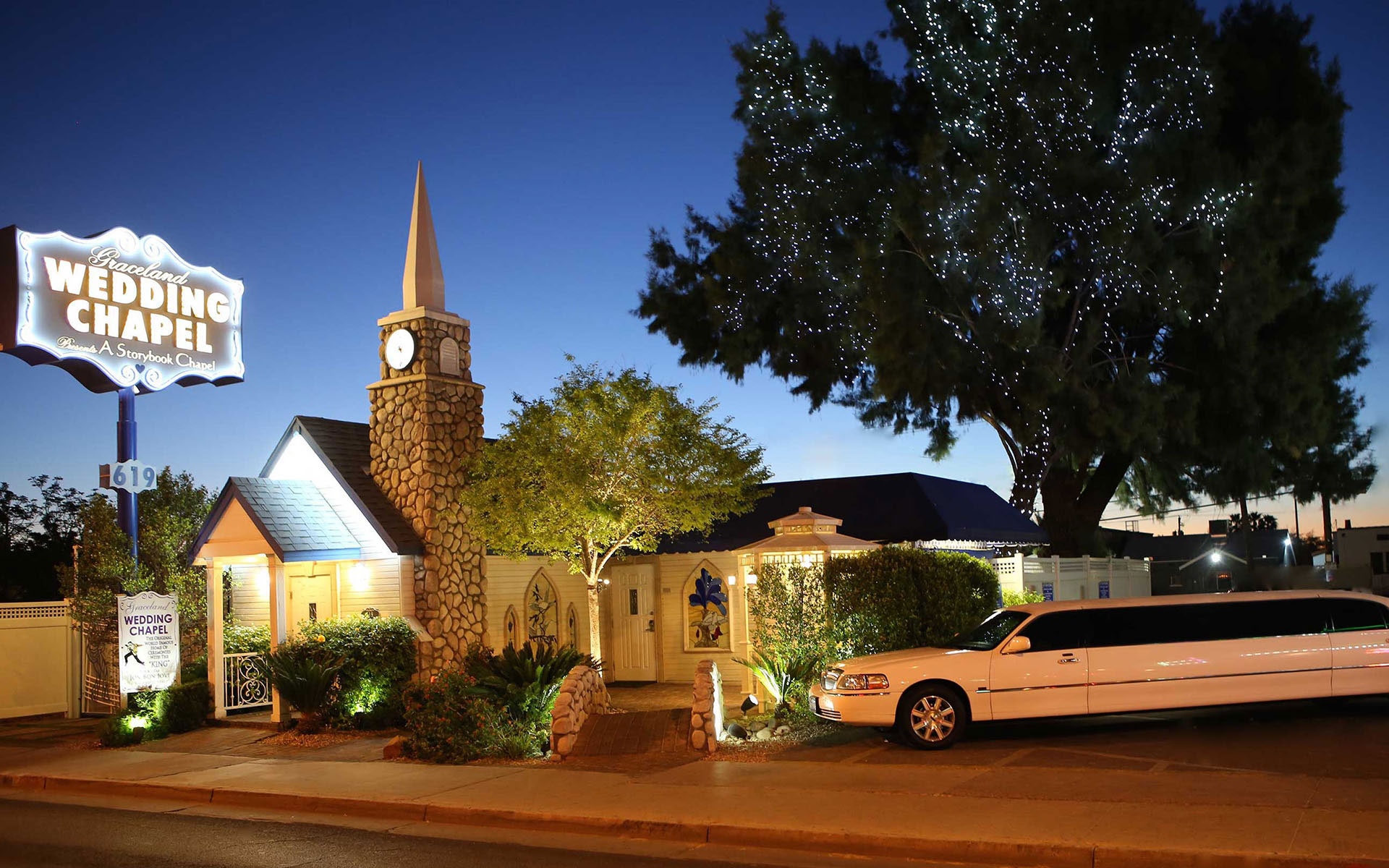
- Former names: McKee's Gretna Green Wedding Chapel

General information
- Location: 619 Las Vegas Blvd. South Las Vegas NV 89101

Website
- Official website

Graceland Wedding Chapel is a wedding chapel located in Las Vegas, Nevada that has been the site of many celebrity weddings. It is one of the oldest wedding chapels in Las Vegas and claims to be the first chapel to conduct weddings performed by Elvis impersonators.

== History and description ==
Built as a private residence in 1927, it has been operating as a wedding chapel since at least 1939 when owner Ollie McKee began performing ceremonies. By the early 1940s it was called Gretna Green Wedding Chapel, named after the Scottish wedding destination of Gretna Green. Elvis Presley visited the chapel in 1967, while planning his wedding to Priscilla Beaulieu. According to Frommer's, Presley himself gave the owners of the chapel permission to use the Graceland name, but in fact it was not renamed until after the singer's death, the same year that Elvis-themed weddings began there.

The chapel is a small building, in the New England style, with a white picket fence. It holds 30 people.

== In film and television ==
- Fools Rush In (1997)
- Fear and Loathing in Las Vegas (1998)
- The Amazing Race 15 (2009)
- 90 Day Fiancé (2020)

== Notable marriages ==
- Billy Ray Cyrus and Leticia Jean Finley, following the birth of Miley Cyrus (1993)
- Jon Bon Jovi (1989)
- Shawn Michaels, four-time world champion in wrestling (1999)
- Aaron Neville (1959)
- Lawrence S. Phillips (1993)
- Mark Scott Ricketts (1991)
- Rob Zombie and Sheri Moon-Zombie (2002)
- Lorenzo Lamas and Kathleen Kinmont (1989)
- Tom Bailey and Alannah Currie (1991)
- Catherine Oxenberg and Casper Van Dien (1999)
- Danny Green, (2002) four-time world-champion in boxing

== See also ==
- List of wedding chapels in Las Vegas
