= The Rodman World Tour =

- Genre: Talk show
- Presented by: Dennis Rodman

Production
- Running time: 30 minutes

Original release
- Network: MTV
- Release: December 8, 1996 – 1997

The Rodman World Tour is an American talk show hosted by athlete Dennis Rodman. It aired on MTV for its 1996 season and had 13 episodes. The show was noted for its odd-ball situations such as Rodman interviewing guests from his bed. Per the LA Times, "The idea is for Rodman's van to roll into town and have the host hang out with a couple celebrities, the main purpose being to see how often Rodman can make them squirm."

The show was filmed in multiple cities including Los Angeles, New York, Las Vegas, Rome and Monte Carlo. Guests included Jay Leno, Jon Lovitz, Kelsey Grammer, Laura Leighton, Tommy Lee, Henry Rollins, Jonathan Silverman, David Alan Grier, Whoopi Goldberg, Chris Rock, Jenny McCarthy, Jean-Claude Van Damme, Mickey Rourke, Barbara Walters and John Singleton.
