= Lazarus Jack =

2004 graphic novel created by Mark Ricketts and Horacio Domingues

- Lazarus Jack TPB
- Date: 29 September 2004
- Publisher: Dark Horse Comics

Creative team
- Writers: Mark Ricketts
- Artists: Horacio Domingues

Original publication
- Language: English
- ISBN: 1-59307-097-7

Lazarus Jack is a graphic novel created by Mark Ricketts and Horacio Domingues and published in 2004 by Dark Horse Comics.

== Synopsis ==
In 1926, magician Jackson "Lazarus Jack" Pierce accidentally causes his wife and three children to become trapped in an extradimensional void. Seventy years later, a mysterious young man offers the aging magician the opportunity to restore his youth, and save his family.
