= Treehouse of Horror XVI =

- The Simpsons episode
- Promotional image for the episode.
- Episode no.: Season 17; Episode 4
- Directed by: David Silverman
- Written by: Marc Wilmore
- Production code: GABF17
- Original air date: November 6, 2005

Guest appearances
- Terry Bradshaw as himself; Dennis Rodman as himself

Episode features
- Commentary: Al Jean; Marc Wilmore; Matt Selman; Kevin Curran; Tom Gammill; Dan Castellaneta; David Silverman

Episode chronology
← Previous "Milhouse of Sand and Fog"	Next → "Marge's Son Poisoning"
- The Simpsons season 17

"Treehouse of Horror XVI" is the fourth episode of the seventeenth season of the American animated television series The Simpsons. It first aired on the Fox network in the United States on November 6, 2005. In the sixteenth annual Treehouse of Horror, the Simpsons replace Bart with a robot son after Bart falls into a coma, Homer and various other characters find themselves on a reality show where Mr. Burns hunts humans for sport, and costumed Springfieldians become whatever they are wearing, thanks to a witch who was disqualified from a Halloween costume contest.

This was the first Treehouse of Horror episode since "Treehouse of Horror XV" not to also serve as the season premiere. It was written by Marc Wilmore and directed by David Silverman. Terry Bradshaw and Dennis Rodman guest star as themselves. Around 11.66 million Americans tuned in to watch the episode during its original broadcast. The episode received mixed reviews.

== Plot ==
In the opening, Kang hopes to speed up an exceedingly slow and boring baseball game, despite Kodos' protests, but ends up destroying the universe when the baseball players go so fast, they turn into a killer vortex which sucks up the whole universe, including God. When Kodos berates Kang off-camera for destroying the universe, Kang responds by leaving a post-it note on the white void, revealing the title of the episode.

=== B.I. Bartificial Intelligence ===
In this spoof of A.I. Artificial Intelligence, Bart winds up in a deep coma which lasts forever after attempting to jump out of a window into a swimming pool. The family takes in a robotic boy, named David, who quickly proves to be a better son. Three months later, at early morning, Bart finally wakes up from his coma and competes against David for the affection of the rest of his family. However, Bart is dumped on a road by Homer, who decides to keep David instead. When Bart finds a group of old rusty robots, he steals their parts at night to become a cyborg. Angry that Homer abandoned him, he then returns home and, without hesitation, cuts through both David and Homer with a chainsaw after the former tries to use Homer as a shield. Although the family is now together again, Homer is angry that he has been fused with David's lower half, which soon collapses due to Homer's weight. Suddenly, the whole scenario is revealed to be a dream conjured by Homer's demonically possessed mind as he is being exorcised by a priest. Marge reluctantly says she will call work and tell them Homer cannot make it in, much to his delight.

=== Survival of the Fattest ===
In a parody of the 1924 Richard Connell short story "The Most Dangerous Game", men from Springfield arrive at Mr. Burns' mansion to go hunting. Unbeknownst to them, they themselves are the prey to be hunted, with Burns pledging that if they survive by noon the following day, they will be free to go home. The hunt is broadcast on live television as The World Series of Manslaughter, with Terry Bradshaw as a guest analyst. Homer manages to survive the night while the others are killed left and right, but Burns closes in on him in the morning. Just as he is about to be shot, Burns and Smithers are knocked out by Marge with a frying pan in each hand, who then hits Homer on the head for being away from home for 18 hours without calling, before they end up having make-up sex behind the astonished Bradshaw.

=== I've Grown a Costume on Your Face ===
In a parody of The Twilight Zone episode "The Masks", the citizens of Springfield dress in their Halloween costumes for a semi-annual contest party. The winner is declared to be a strange old green-skinned witch. When given the award and asked who she is, she is forced to admit that she is a real witch. As a result, her reward is rescinded because she is not in actual costume. In anger over losing her gift certificate, she turns everyone into their costumed characters, including transforming Homer into a decapitated human, Marge into a skeleton, Bart into a werewolf, Lisa into Albert Einstein, Dr. Hibbert into Count Dracula, Apu into R2-D2, Patty and Selma into two halves of a horse, Milhouse into a bulldozer, Nelson into a racoon (despite protesting that he is the Lone Ranger, and too poor to afford the hat), Hans Moleman into a mole (who ironically was not wearing a costume), Moe into Hugh Hefner, Principal Skinner into a GI Joe (without genitalia), his mother Agnes into a southern belle, Sherri and Terri into Tweedledee and Tweedledum (with sphere-shaped bodies) and Mayor Quimby into Mayor McCheese. The only person who can reverse the spell is Maggie, who was dressed as a witch. After the townspeople are split over being reverted to normal or being left as costumes, a confused and indecisive Maggie turns them all into pacifiers with their normal heads, and then flies off to seek help for her error. The segment ends as Moe and a transformed Dennis Rodman (who was in Springfield working off a speeding ticket) talk to the audience about the importance of reading, before Maggie returns and ends the episode by casting another spell, presumably turning everyone back to normal.

== Production ==
Former football player Terry Bradshaw and former basketball player Dennis Rodman appeared as themselves.

== Cultural references ==
The "B.I. Bartificial Intelligence" segment is a parody of the 2001 film A.I. Artificial Intelligence with an ending that is a reference to the 1973 film The Exorcist. The "Survival of the Fattest" segment is a parody of the 1924 short story "The Most Dangerous Game". The "I've Grown a Costume on Your Face" segment is a parody of the episode "The Masks" from the television series The Twilight Zone, while the title references the song "I've Grown Accustomed to Her Face", which was also parodied by Sideshow Bob, the season 14 episode "The Great Louse Detective", and the ending with Maggie flying to the moon reference the sitcom Bewitched. Additionally, Chief Wiggum's costume is disgraced Subway spokesman Jared Fogle, describing himself as "only slightly overweight, and sexually ambiguous."

== Reception ==
=== Viewing figures ===
The episode earned 4.2 rating and was watched by 11.66 million viewers, which was the 24th most-watched show that week.

=== Critical response ===
Ryan J. Budke of TV Squad thought it was the best Treehouse of Horror episode in several seasons. He liked the A.I. parody and thought the second segment was "one of the funniest 'Treehouse of Horror' segments that's aired in a long time. At the very least, this decade." However, he said the final segment "seemed to fall flat for me."

Colin Jacobson of DVD Movie Guide liked the episode. He said "[w]hile not among the series' best 'Treehouse' episodes, it comes with enough cleverness to succeed."

On Four Finger Discount, Brendan Dando enjoyed the episode, liking the different genres of the episode. However, Guy Davis thought the episode was not as good as previous Treehouse of Horror episodes and did not like the middle segment.

In 2022, Alison Foreman of IndieWire named the episode as the tenth-best Treehouse of Horror episode.

In 2023, Dennis Perkins of Entertainment Weekly ranked the episode at 29 out of 34 Treehouse of Horror episodes, saying the "twists come off more like the writers waving their hands and declaring that these 'Treehouse' stories don't require the effort to make the gags land."

In 2024, Joshua Karp of Vulture ranked the segments at 82, 62, and 47, respectively, out of 107.
