= List of wedding chapels in Las Vegas =

This is a list of notable wedding chapels located in Las Vegas, with the area defined broadly as the Las Vegas Valley.

According to a travel magazine source in 2023, these chapels have "iconic appeal" and there are about 50 on or near the Las Vegas Strip alone.

Wedding chapels in Las Vegas
Name	Image	Location	Established	Other information
A Little White Wedding Chapel		1301 S. Las Vegas Blvd; 36.15517°N 115.14973°W	1951	
Chapel of the Flowers		1717 Las Vegas Boulevard South; 36.15066°N 115.15256°W	1955	
Graceland Wedding Chapel		619 Las Vegas Blvd. South; 36.16266°N 115.14470°W	1939	Formerly known as Gretna Green Wedding Chapel; the name was changed after the death of Elvis Presley
Mon Bel Ami Wedding Chapel		607 S Las Vegas Blvd; 36.16298°N 115.14428°W	1950s; renovated and renamed in 2003	Formerly known as the Silver Bell Wedding Chapel
Little Church of the West		4617 S Las Vegas Blvd., Paradise, Nevada; 36.08611°N 115.17194°W	1943	The oldest building on Las Vegas Strip; it is on the National Register of Historic Places.
Wee Kirk o' the Heather		36.16696°N 115.14183°W	1940	One of the first wedding chapels in Las Vegas; it was demolished on October 3, 2020
Elvis Chapel		1320 S Casino Center Blvd; 36.15520°N 115.15297°W	1988	Las Vegas wedding chapel offering Elvis-themed ceremonies.
