= Little Church of the West =

Wedding chapel in Las Vegas, Nevada

- U.S. National Register of Historic Places
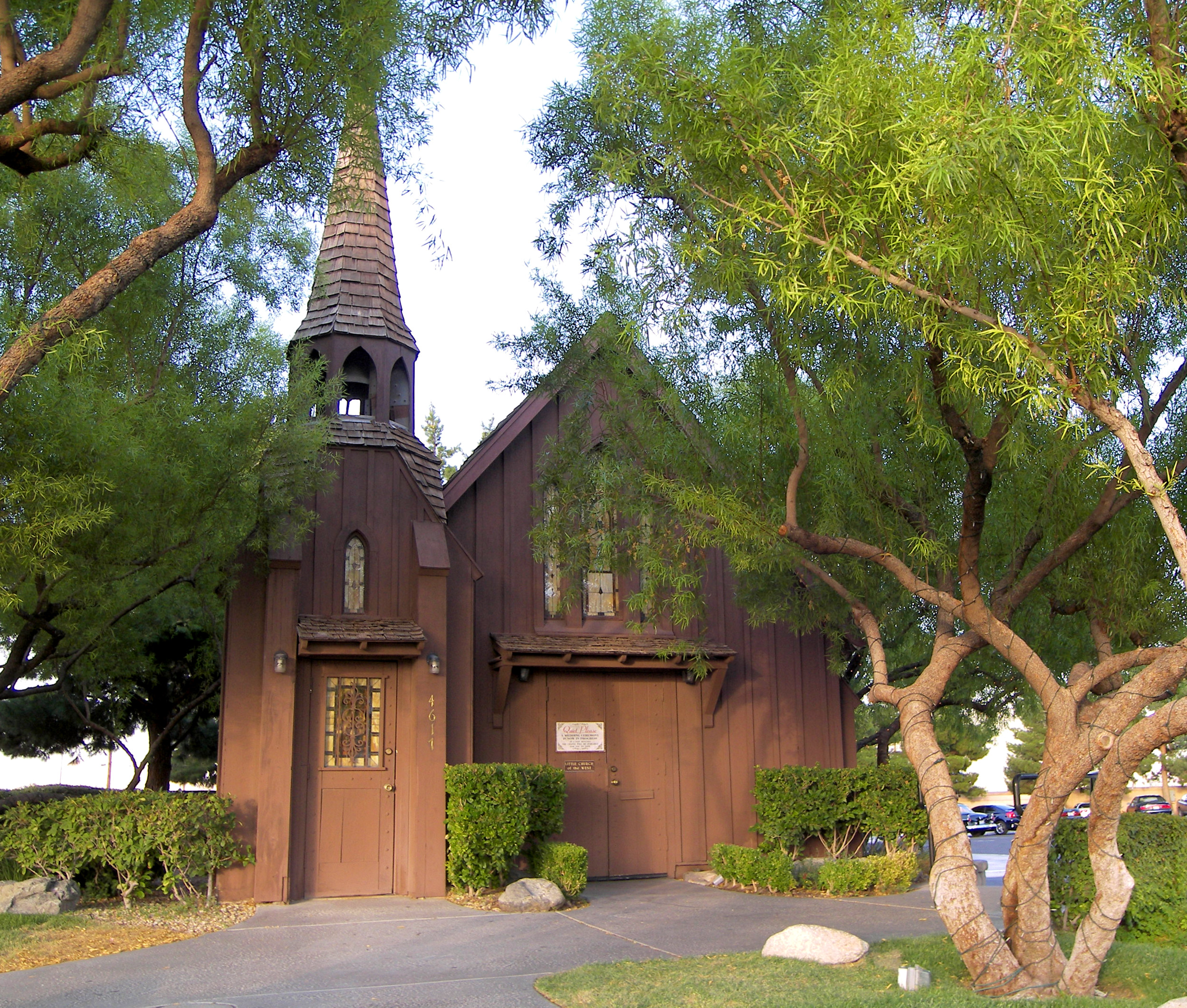
- The Little Church of the West (2007)
- Location: 4617 S Las Vegas Blvd. Paradise, Nevada, U.S.
- Nearest city: Las Vegas
- Coordinates: 36°5′10″N 115°10′19″W
- Built: 1943
- Architectural style: Late Gothic Revival
- NRHP reference No.: 92001161
- Added to NRHP: September 14, 1992

Little Church of the West is a wedding chapel on the Las Vegas Strip in Paradise, Nevada, United States, that is listed on the United States National Register of Historic Places. Built of redwood, it was intended to be a replica of a typical pioneer town church. It is the oldest building on the Las Vegas Strip.

== History ==
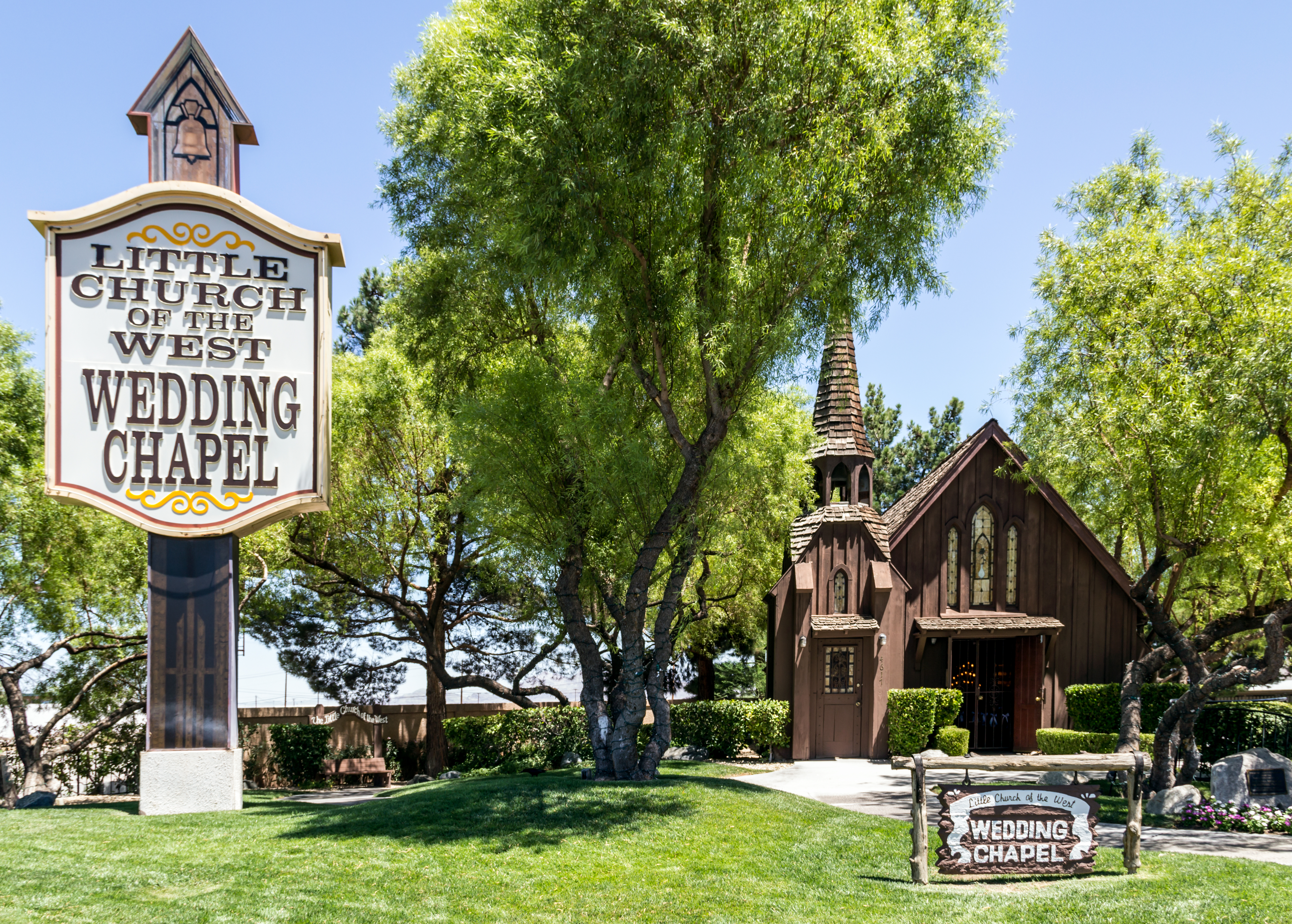
Church signage in 2012

The Little Church of the West opened May 22, 1943 on what became the Las Vegas Strip. The chapel was originally built as part of the Hotel Last Frontier complex on the Strip. It was moved from the north side of the hotel to the south side in 1954. In 1979, to make way for the Fashion Show Mall, the chapel was moved onto the grounds of the Hacienda hotel-casino. In December 1996, when the Hacienda was closed and demolished, the chapel was moved again to its current location on the east side of the Strip, south of the eventual Mandalay Bay resort.

The church was listed on the National Register of Historic Places (NRHP) on September 14, 1992, and is the only building on the Las Vegas Strip to be listed.

In 2002, the church performed 6,000 weddings a year, and more than 250,000 couples had been married there since its opening. In 2017, it celebrated its 75th anniversary and remains the oldest building on the Las Vegas Strip.

=== Film history ===
In an episode of Perry Mason titled "The Case of the Startled Stallion" (1959) the church is mentioned and the neon sign is shown. It appears in the 1964 film Viva Las Vegas, in which the film's characters played by Elvis Presley and Ann-Margret recite their vows in the church. In the 1978-81 ABC series Vega$ the chapel appears in "Serve, Volley, and Kill" (Season 1, Episode 11, 1978), starring Red Buttons as "Reverend" Tommy Cirko, "All Kinds of Love" (Season 2, Episode 14, 1980), and "Vendetta" (Season 2, Episode 23, 1980).

== Notable weddings ==
- Betty Grable and Harry James (1943)
- Andy Russell and Della Norell (1945)
- Deanna Durbin and Felix Jackson (1945)
- Zsa Zsa Gabor and George Sanders (1949)
- Fernando Lamas and Arlene Dahl (1954)
- Dinah Washington and Dick Lane (1963)
- Judy Garland and Mark Herron (1965)
- David Cassidy and Kay Lenz (1977)
- Bob Geldof and Paula Yates (1986)
- Dudley Moore and Brogan Lane (1988)
- Redd Foxx and Ka Ha Cho (1991)
- Richard Gere and Cindy Crawford (1991)
- Noel Gallagher and Meg Matthews (1997)
- Billy Bob Thornton and Angelina Jolie (2000)
- Billie Piper and Chris Evans (2001)
- Jodie Sweetin and Cody Herpin (2007)
- Marguerite Ravn and Cormac Quinn (2010)
- Mickey Rooney
- Robert Goulet
- Buck Owens
- David Sanborn
- Telly Savalas
- Heather Thomas
- Mel Tormé
- Margaret Whiting
- Lars Ulrich
- Ian Astbury
- Max Blumenthal and Anya Parampil

== See also ==
- List of wedding chapels in Las Vegas
