= Charolette Richards =

Charolette Richards (died December 13, 2023) was a woman who was known as the "Wedding Queen of the West".

She arrived in Vegas on June 10, 1959, from Kentucky, thinking she was following her then husband, but he was not at their intended meeting place. Needing to earn a living to support their children, Richards ended up in the wedding industry and opened the first drive-through wedding chapel and officiated the first helicopter wedding in Las Vegas. On "Blackjack Day", July 7, 2007, Richards performed 547 weddings.

When the chapel went to auction she bid, putting down $50,000, loaned from a friend and to pay off the rest, lived there and operated 24 hours a day until the Las Vegas marriage bureau changed its hours. She subsequently owned A Little White Wedding Chapel for more than sixty years and outside of her chapel, served as wedding coordinator for Elvis and Priscilla Presley's 1967 ceremony.
