= Marge's Son Poisoning =

- The Simpsons episode
- Episode no.: Season 17; Episode 5
- Directed by: Mike B. Anderson
- Written by: Daniel Chun
- Production code: GABF20
- Original air date: November 13, 2005

Episode features
- Couch gag: The Simpsons go to sit on the couch, but the couch grows fangs and snarls at the family. The Simpsons run out into the street, where everyone's chairs, sofas, and loungers are rising up and attacking their masters. Sherri and Terri are swallowed by their beanbag chairs, Officers Eddie and Lou are trapped in their police car as the couches rock it back and forth, Professor Frink is attacked by his futuristic couch, and Moe fights back against his bar stools by blasting them with his shotgun. Homer hides out from the rampaging seats in a store called “Couch World”, but is not safe there as all the couches pile on top of Homer and crush him.
- Commentary: Al Jean; Mike B. Anderson; David Silverman; Matt Selman; Jeff Westbrook; Tom Gammill; Max Pross

Episode chronology
← Previous "Treehouse of Horror XVI"	Next → "See Homer Run"
- The Simpsons season 17

"Marge's Son Poisoning" is the fifth episode of the seventeenth season of the American animated television series The Simpsons. It originally aired on the Fox network in the United States on November 13, 2005. The episode was the first one written by Daniel Chun and was directed by Mike B. Anderson.

In this episode, Bart bonds with Marge when he sees that she is lonely while Homer participates in arm wrestling after he uses a dumbbell to make his arm strong. The episode received mixed reviews.

== Plot ==
The family visits Paradise Pier, the Ferris wheel of which Marge has been looking forward all her life to riding when she was a little girl, only to find out that it is being dismantled with its equipment being too old. Homer purchases a dumbbell, while Marge gets a tandem bicycle. When Marge wants to take the bike for a ride, she finds Homer and the kids unwilling to join her. Marge tries it on her own and repeatedly falls. Realizing that she might actually be lonely, Bart offers to go for a ride with her. They ride into an unincorporated part of the county and come upon a small village that features a tea house. Later, the tea house closes forever, causing Bart to invite Marge to his treehouse for tea.

Marge redecorates the treehouse and the pair goes off to get a new tea service; Bart gets a Krusty the Clown Tea Set. Outside the store, the bullies Jimbo, Dolph and Kearney accuse Bart of being a mama's boy, which causes Bart to rebel against her, losing his temper, and since he is rebellious, he destroys the treehouse inside that Marge prepared minutes ago until Lisa came. Marge goes into a depression and eventually sells the bike to Chief Wiggum, Eddie and Lou.

Feeling bad, Bart offers to team with her in a karaoke contest. While seeing Principal Skinner and his mother Agnes perform, Marge has visions of a bad future for her and Bart, and she stops the show to prevent that future from occurring. She then lets Bart know that he can find his own way of life and that he should not worry about her because she has to worry about him. To make things better, she gives him a fire extinguisher to spray in front of the audience, including the bullies that tormented him.

Meanwhile, at Moe's Tavern, Homer shows off the strength in one of his arms he has gained from working with the dumbbell, and Moe has an idea on how to capitalize on it. Moe takes Homer to the arm wrestling championships, where Homer readily wins the grand prize—a refund on his $50 admission fee—but finds that he really misses his wife. He drives home to reunite with Marge at karaoke, stopping to win a pie-eating contest along the way.

== Reception ==
=== Viewing figures ===
The episode earned a 4.1 rating and was watched by 11.41 million viewers, which was the 27th most-watched show that week.

=== Critical response ===
Ryan Budke of The Huffington Post praised the episode, saying "although, this episode wasn't the best this season, it was still a great one, and a vast improvement over the majority of shows they've had in the past couple of years."

Colin Jacobson of DVD Movie Guide said that the episode is an example of the season bringing "nothing new" but liked seeing how Marge recognizing how she has changed Bart.

On Four Finger Discount, Brendan Dando enjoyed the episode, finding the Marge and Bart plot relatable. However, Guy Davis thought the couch gag was funny, but the episode got progressively worse. They also thought the subplot with Homer had no point.

Jesse Schedeen of IGN thought the scene of Bart being too busy to ride a tandem bike with Marge because he was playing a video game where he rides a tandem bike was funny because it showed how "people are happy to play video games simulating dull, laborious activities they'd never undertake in real life."
