= Lawrence S. Phillips =

- Born: March 20, 1927
- Died: September 11, 2015 (aged 88)
- Education: B.A. Princeton University
- Occupation: Executive
- Known for: chairman of Phillips-Van Heusen
- Spouse(s): Anne Phillips (divorced); Roxane Frechie (divorced)
- Children: 2
- Parent(s): Madelyn Shapiro Phillips; Seymour Phillips

Lawrence S. Phillips (March 20, 1927 – September 11, 2015) was an American businessman who was chairman of Phillips-Van Heusen until 1995.

== Biography ==
Phillips was born to a Jewish family, the son of Madelyn (née) Shapiro and Seymour Phillips. His great-grandfather, Moses Phillips, was the founder of the family business selling t-shirts out of a cart to coal miners in Pottsville, Pennsylvania; the business was then taken over by his son Isaac Philipps and then by Lawrence's father, Seymour. He has a sister, Carol Philipps Nash Green. He was a graduate of Princeton University. He was on the boards of PetSmart and the Fashion Institute of Technology in New York. He was the founder and chairman of the American Jewish World Service.

== Personal life ==
Philipps married twice. Both his marriages ended in divorce. His first wife was Anne Phillips; they had two children. In 1993, he married Roxane Frechie in a nondenominational ceremony at the Graceland Wedding Chapel in Las Vegas, Nevada.

His political activity earned him a place on the master list of Richard Nixon's political opponents.
