= Chapel of the Flowers =

Wedding chapel in Las Vegas, Nevada

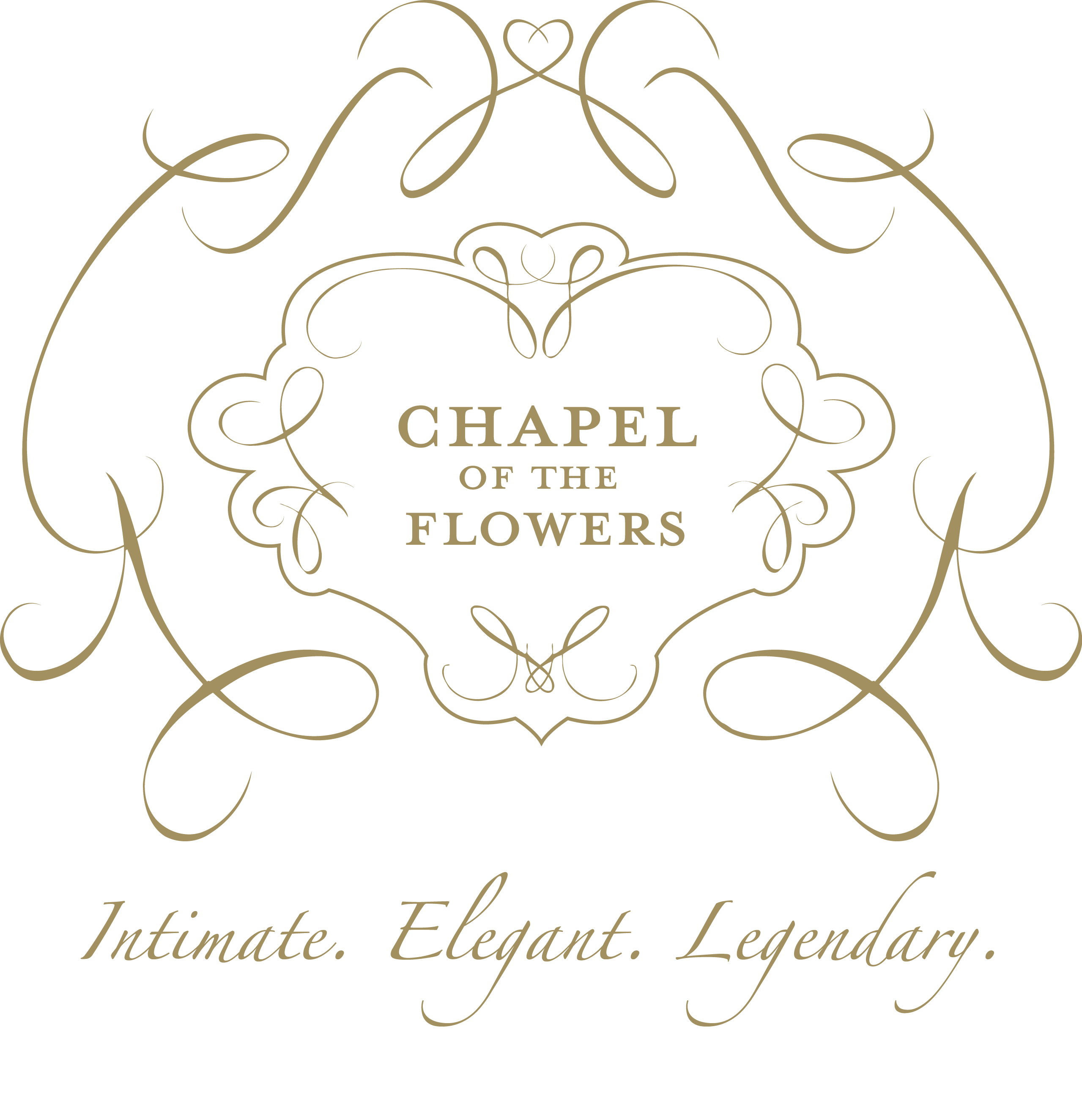

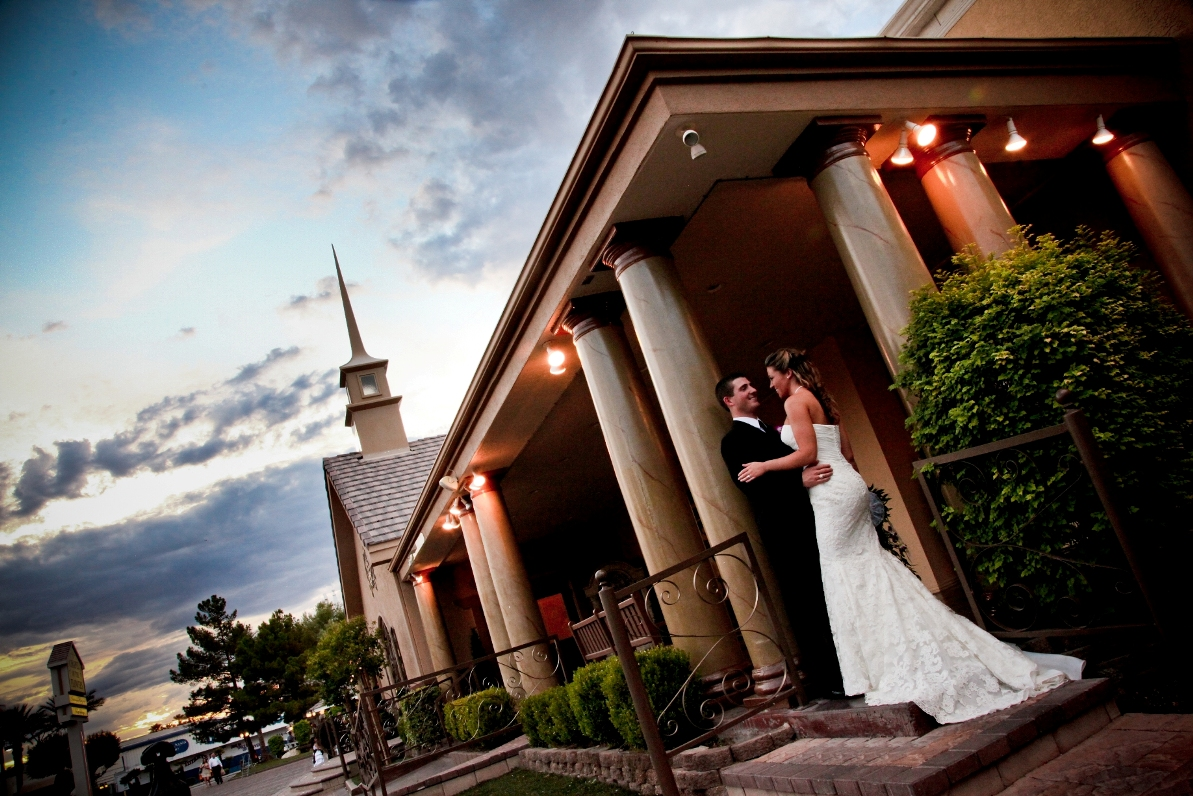
- Former names: Little Chapel of the Flowers

General information
- Type: Chapel
- Address: 1717 Las Vegas Blvd. South; Las Vegas, NV 89104
- Coordinates: 36.15066°N 115.15256°W

Technical details
- Size: one acre

Other information
- Number of rooms: Four indoor, one outdoor
- Facilities: Flower Shop; Photo Gallery; Photographers; Videographers; Wedding Planners; Limousines

Website
- www.littlechapel.com

Chapel of the Flowers (formerly Little Chapel of the Flowers) is a wedding chapel located at 1717 Las Vegas Boulevard South in Las Vegas, Nevada, United States.

Chapel of the Flowers was one of the earliest wedding chapels built on The Strip, but has undergone numerous renovations in its history. It is considered one of the more traditional wedding chapels in Las Vegas. Couples from all over the world come to this chapel to get married. The chapel is owned by Allegiant CEO Maurice Gallagher.

== Celebrities ==
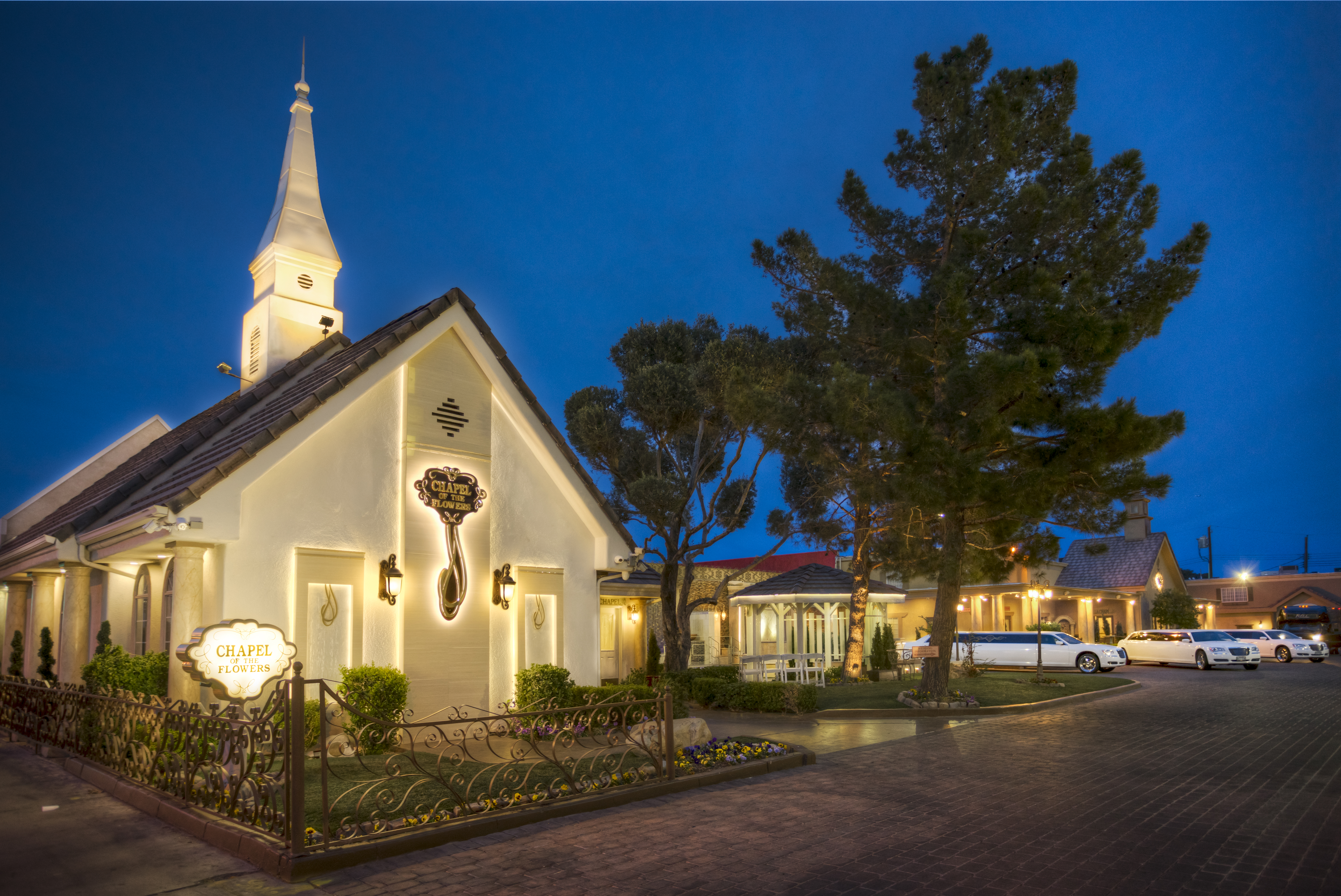
Chapel of the Flowers, as seen from Las Vegas Boulevard

Chapel of the Flowers is known for being the wedding location for Dennis Rodman and Carmen Electra, as well as the setting for the reality TV show "Happily Ever Faster" on TLC (TV channel). Ronnie Vannucci, the drummer for The Killers, worked as a photographer at the chapel while the band was recording their first album, "Hot Fuss". Additionally, Chapel of the Flowers has also served as the location on several celebrity occasions, including for the music videos "Last Name" by Carrie Underwood filmed in the Victorian Chapel and "Why Wait" by Rascal Flatts starring David Arquette as the groom and comedian Ron White as the minister. Vegas Golden Knights hockey player, Ryan Reaves, performed a vow renewal ceremony for one lucky couple who entered the "Get Married by Reaves" contest by Chapel of the Flowers. Mogul Richard Branson also orchestrated a publicity stunt where he served as Best Man for a UK couple, with the wedding taking place at Chapel of the Flowers.

== Today ==
The Las Vegas wedding chapel currently operates as a venue for weddings and other ceremonies. They offer several related services such as wedding planning, lodging, music, photography, flowers, and live Internet broadcasting for customers.

Chapel of the Flowers has won numerous awards; including: TripAdvisor “Travelers' Choice” (2015 - 2020); The Knot Worldwide “Best of Weddings” (2011 - 2020) and “Hall of Fame”; WeddingWire “Couple’s Choice Awards” for “Best Wedding Venue: Las Vegas” (2010 - 2012, 2015 - 2019); as well as the Las Vegas Review-Journal Readers Pick for “Best Place to Get Married” in Las Vegas (2010-2012 & 2016 - 2019).

== Notable weddings ==
- John "Johnny Wadd" Holmes and Laurie Rose (aka Misty Dawn) (1987)
- Dennis Rodman and Carmen Electra (November 15, 1998)

== See also ==
- List of wedding chapels in Las Vegas
