= Wee Kirk o' the Heather (Las Vegas) =

Wedding chapel in Nevada, United States

Coordinates: 36.16696°N 115.14183°W

Wee Kirk o' the Heather, the oldest wedding chapel in Las Vegas.

The Wee Kirk o' the Heather was a wedding chapel in Las Vegas, Nevada. The chapel opened in the early 1940s when Mrs. J Edwards Webb began performing wedding ceremonies in the front room of a home that was built in the 1920s. The business was known as Webb’s Wedding Chapel, then as Wee Kirk o’ the Heather.

Wee Kirk was mentioned in Thomas Pynchon's 2009 novel Inherent Vice (pg. 246).

The chapel was closed in 2020, and demolished October 3, 2020. At the time it closed, Wee Kirk claimed to be "the original wedding chapel in Las Vegas," was cited as the first and/or oldest chapel in Las Vegas. However, nearby Graceland Wedding Chapel, which began operating as McKee’s Wedding Chapel circa 1939, was verifiably older. The first stand-alone, dedicated wedding chapel in Las Vegas, was called "Wedding Chapel," which opened in 1933.

== See also ==
- List of wedding chapels in Las Vegas
