= Wedding chapel =

Chapel for conducting a wedding

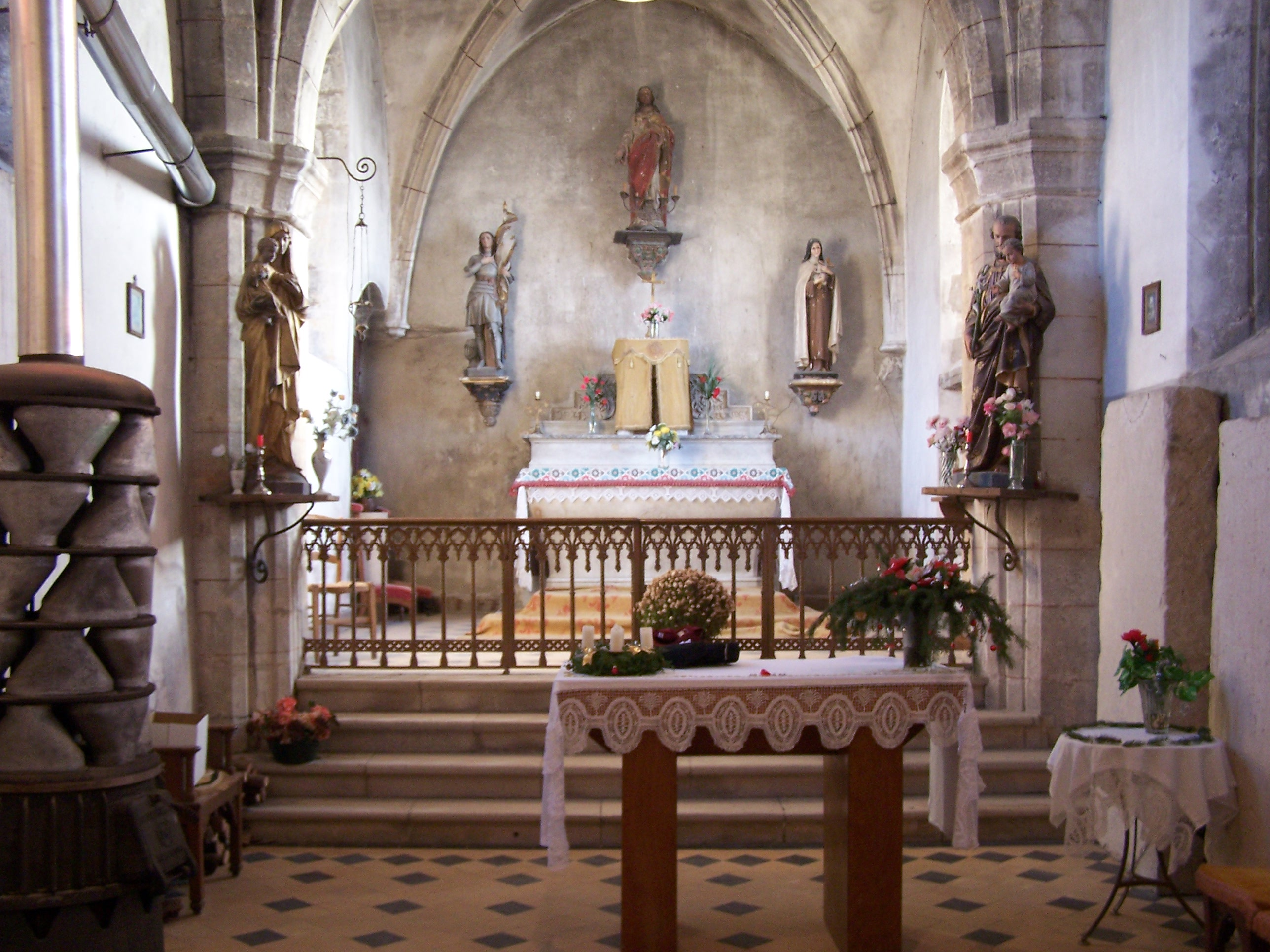
A traditional French chapel at Château de Hattonchâtel

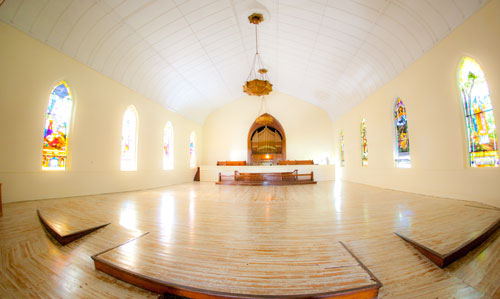
Celebration Chapel in the historic Rondout district of Kingston, New York opened on the day that the Marriage Equality Act became law in New York state

A wedding chapel is a building or room, other than a legal court, where marriages are regularly performed. Usually wedding chapels are for-profit venues to host weddings in resort areas to encourage hotel room stays, catering and gambling by the guests. The buildings are generally religiously themed and imitate church architecture. In some cases, religious institutions have chapels that are used specifically for marriages or closed churches are converted into wedding chapels. These ceremonial events can additionally occur in funeral homes, mausoleum chapels or cemetery chapels.

== Las Vegas ==
Las Vegas, Nevada, particularly, is famous for its large number of wedding chapels because Nevada has no waiting period to file for marriage licenses. Some of the wedding chapels in Las Vegas feature an Elvis impersonator.

== Requirements ==
Wedding chapels across the world must perform their ceremonies under specific laws, depending on the region in which they are located. In the United States, for example, wedding chapels usually require: marriage licenses and identity documents. Requirements for minors to marry vary from state to state.

== See also ==
- Las Vegas weddings
