= Kathleen Kinmont =

American actress

- Born: February 3, 1965 (age 61)
- Occupation: Actress
- Years active: 1984–present
- Spouse(s): Lorenzo Lamas (m. 1989; div. 1993) Doug Miller (m. 2026)
- Mother: Abby Dalton

Kathleen Kinmont (born Kathleen Kinmont Smith; February 3, 1965) is an American actress who starred in film and on television. Kinmont is best known for playing Kelly Meeker in Halloween 4: The Return of Michael Myers. She is also known for playing Cheyenne Phillips in the TV series Renegade (1992-96) starring her ex-husband, Lorenzo Lamas.

== Early years ==
Kinmont is the daughter of actress Abby Dalton.

== Career ==
Her first feature film role was in the comedy Hardbodies (1984). Her best-known roles include the horror film Halloween 4: The Return of Michael Myers (1988) as Kelly Meeker and in Bride of Re-Animator as the title character. She played the title role in CIA Code Name: Alexa, which she reprised in the sequel CIA II: Target Alexa. She later appeared in Lime Salted Love (2005).

She starred on television series such as Santa Barbara as Marilyn Cassidy in 1992. Her big role was in the syndicated television series Renegade as Cheyenne Phillips (1992–1996). She was reportedly dropped from the series in 1996 when she made derogatory comments in the press about Lorenzo Lamas' future wife Shauna Sand, who had been making appearances on the show. She has made guest appearances on such television series as Dallas, Baywatch, Silk Stalkings, V.I.P. and Days of Our Lives.

== Other professional activities ==
Kinmont became involved in a variety of projects as a writer, director and director of photography. She also had a photography business in 2013 in the Los Angeles area, and has released a yoga video called "Kathleen Kinmont's Restorative Core Yoga".

== Personal life ==
In 1989, Kinmont married Lorenzo Lamas, star of Renegade, with whom she had been friends for 11 years. They divorced in 1993. Lamas had portrayed the son of Kinmont's mother Abby Dalton on TV's Falcon Crest. She announced on her Instagram account that she married her long time boyfriend Doug Miller on March 25, 2026.

== Filmography ==
=== Film ===
Year	Title	Role	Notes
1984	Hardbodies	Pretty Skater	
1985	Fraternity Vacation	Marianne	
1987	Winners Take All	Party Girl #5	Music Video
1987	Nightforce	Cindy	Direct-to-video
1988	She-Wolves of the Wasteland	Phoenix	
1988	Halloween 4: The Return of Michael Myers	Kelly Meeker	
1989	Rush Week	Judith Ann McGuffin	
1989	Midnight	Party	
1989	Snake Eater II: The Drug Buster	Detective Lisa Forester	
1989	Bride of Re-Animator	Gloria / The Bride	
1989	Roller Blade Warriors: Taken by Force	Karin Crosse	
1991	Night of the Warrior	Katherine Pierce	
1991	The Art of Dying	Holly	
1991	Final Impact	Maggie	
1992	CIA Code Name: Alexa	Alexa	
1992	Sweet Justice	Heather	
1993	CIA II: Target Alexa	Alexa	
1994	Final Round	Jordan	Direct-to-video
1995	Texas Payback	Angela	
1995	Stormswept	Missy	
1996	Punctual zero	Brigitte	
1996	That Thing You Do!	Koss' Secretary	
1996	Dead of Night	Katherine	
1997	The Corporate Ladder	Nicole Landon	
1997	Stranger in the House	Dorothy Liddell	
2001	Gangland	Alexis	
2002	Bare Witness	Detective Holly McGee	Direct-to-video
2002	Psychotic	Natalie Montana	
2006	Lime Salted Love	Dr. Lina Baxter	
2008	Prank	Kat	
2011	Monsterpiece Theatre Volume 1	Lily Stevens	Segment: "Rottentail"
2019	Ernesto's Manifesto	Barbara	
2023	Dark Obsession	Elizabeth	

=== Television ===
Year	Title	Role	Notes
1965	The Joey Bishop Show	Baby	Season 4, Episode 25 "What'll You Have?"
1984	The Master	Model #2	Season 1, Episode 8 "The Good, the Bad, and the Priceless"
1991	Dallas	'Cookie'	Season 14, Episode 14 "Smooth Operator"
1992	Santa Barbara	Marilyn Cassidy	Soap opera
1994	Baywatch	Morgan Christopher	Season 5, Episode 7 "Someone to Baywatch Over You"
1992-1996	Renegade	Cheyenne Phillips	Seasons 1–4
1998	Safety Patrol	Newsperson	ABC television film
1997-1999	Silk Stalkings	Charlene Ballard	Season 7, Episode 11 "The Wedge"; Season 8, Episode 21 "Noir: Part 1"; Season 8, Episode 22 "Noir: Part 2"
1999	Mortal Kombat: Konquest	Dion	Season 1, Episode 21 "Stolen Lies"
2001	V.I.P.	Agent Madison	Season 4, Episode 5 "South by Southwest"
2002	Days of Our Lives	Dr. Richards	Soap opera; 2 episodes

=== Additional credits ===
- 1993 CIA II: Target Alexa - writer
- 2011 In Between (short film; 2011) - cinematographer
- 2012 The Perfection of Anna (short film) - associate producer, cinematographer
- 2012 The Adventures of Soap Man (short film) - associate producer
- 2013 Mrs. Sweeney (short film) - writer, producer, director
- 2014 Bump and Grind (TV series - "Pilot") - writer, producer, director
