= Dan Tullis Jr. =

American actor

- Born: July 8, 1951 (age 75); Oxnard, California, U.S.
- Other names: Daniel Tullis, Dan Tullis
- Education: Ventura College, California State University, Long Beach
- Occupations: American stage, film and television actor
- Years active: 1978-present

Dan Tullis Jr. (born July 8, 1951) is an American actor. He has played the recurring role of Officer Dan on the sitcom Married... with Children. He also has made an appearance in shows such as 227, The Drew Carey Show, and The District among others. In 1992, he was a regular cast member on the short-lived television series Rachel Gunn, R.N..

== Biography ==
In 1976, he appeared with his family on the game show Family Feud. Nine years later, he appeared on Tic Tac Dough, winning more than $15,000 in cash and prizes.

In 1987, Dan Tullis Jr. played the role of Sergeant 1st Class Luther Fry in the film, Extreme Prejudice; co-starring alongside Nick Nolte, Powers Boothe, and Maria Conchita Alonso.

Tullis has also worked in theater. He has played Joe in Show Boat in over 18 productions worldwide, including Long Island, Europe and Australia.

In a California theater production of Little Shop of Horrors, he was cast as the voice of the flesh-eating plant.

In commercials, he has been the television and radio spokesman for SelectQuote, a life insurance company.

== Personal life ==
Tullis has two children: Jillian Tullis and Dan Tullis III. Both are educators.

== Filmography ==
Year	Title	Role	Notes
1978	Ziegfeld: The Man and His Women	Stevedore	TV movie
1986	Hill Street Blues	Worker #3	
1986	The A-Team	Himself	Season 5, Ep. 3
1987	Extreme Prejudice	Sergeant Luther Fry	Film
1988	Under the Gun	Gang Leader	
1989	Hunter	Walker	
1989	One of the Boys	Beastmaster	TV series
1989	Harlem Nights	Crapshooter	
1989	227	Meat Hook	
1990	The First Power	Cop At Arrest	
1990	Appearances	1st Deputy	TV movie
1990	Backstreet Dreams (film)	'Tank'	
1991	Backdraft	Engine 17 Firefighter (uncredited)	
1992	Rachel Gunn, R.N.	Dane Grey	
1993	CIA Code Name: Alexa	Terrorist	Film
1993	Private Wars	Mo Williams	Video
1993	George	Mr. Jasso	
1989–1997	Married... with Children	Officer Dan	
1997	Arli$$	Security Guard	
1999	Home Improvement	Police Officer	
1999	The Drew Carey Show	Lawyer	
2001–2002	Son of the Beach	Guard / Prison Guard	
2002–2003	The District	Commander Young	
