= Shayne Lamas =

American reality television personality and actress

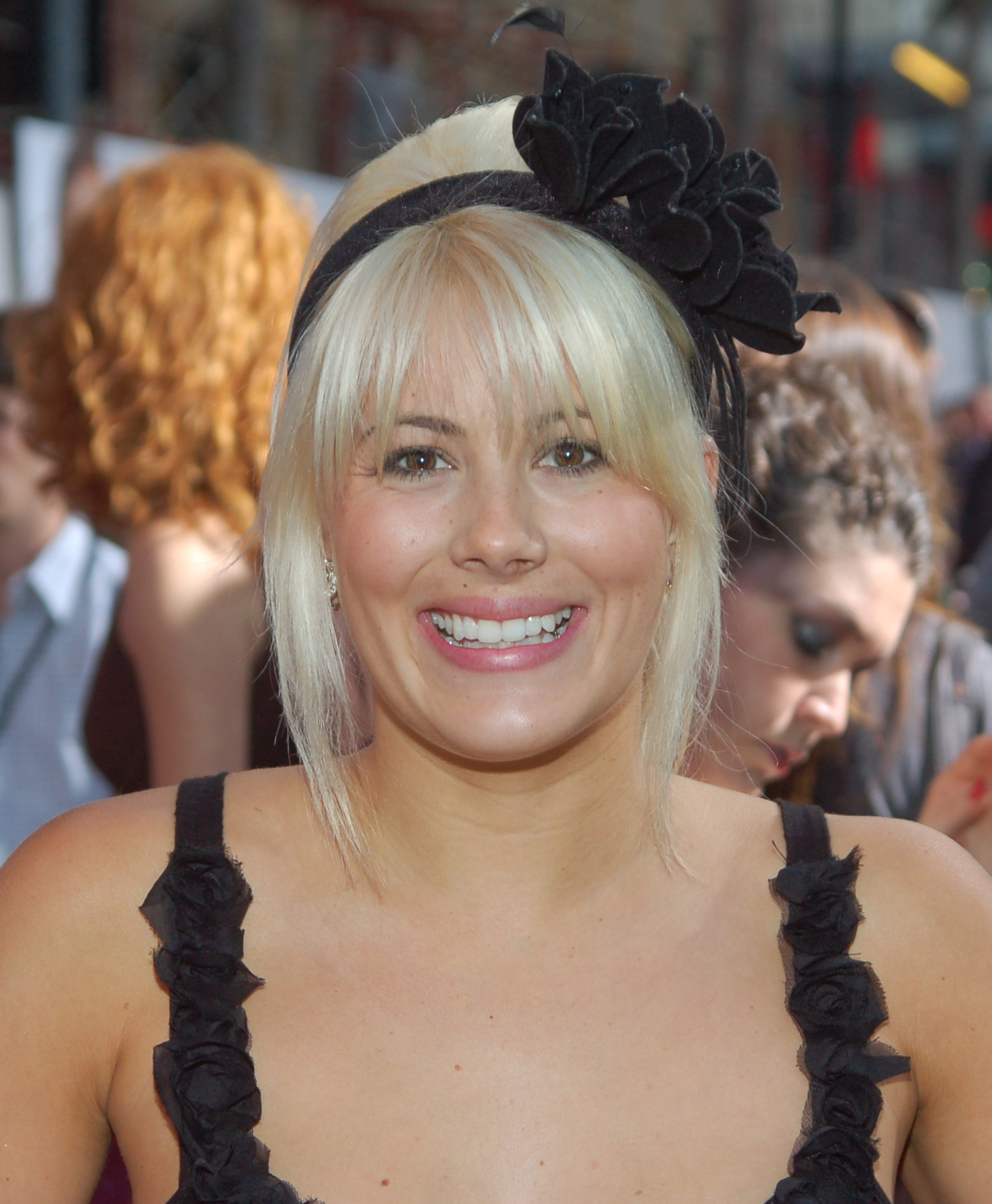
- Lamas in 2009
- Born: 1984 or 1985 (age 40–41); Santa Monica, California, U.S.
- Occupations: Television personality, actress
- Years active: 1999, 2003–present
- Known for: Reality show The Bachelor
- Spouse: Nik Richie (m. 2010; div. 2021)
- Children: 2
- Father: Lorenzo Lamas
- Relatives: AJ Lamas (brother); Fernando Lamas (grandfather); Arlene Dahl (grandmother)

Shayne Lamas (born 1984 or 1985) is an American reality television personality and actress. She is known as the winner of the twelfth season of The Bachelor.

== Early life ==
Lamas was born in Santa Monica, California, the daughter of Lorenzo Lamas and Michele Smith. Her brother is actor AJ Lamas. Her grandparents were Argentine actor Fernando Lamas and American actress Arlene Dahl.

== Career ==
Lamas won season 12 of ABC's The Bachelor, with Matt Grant, who proposed to her on the season finale. Lamas has been in Leave It to Lamas, General Hospital, Air America, and The 13th Alley.

== Personal life ==
Lamas was engaged to British bachelor Matt Grant after winning ABC's The Bachelor season 12. Grant proposed to Lamas in the show's season finale. In July 2008, amid rumors of a split, Lamas and Matt Grant announced they were no longer engaged. "We tried hard to make it work but we realized that we were both heading in different directions," the duo said in a statement. "We truly care about each other and will remain close friends."

Lamas went on to marry gossip website founder and Internet personality Nik Richie eight hours after meeting in A Little White Wedding Chapel in Las Vegas, Nevada, on April 18, 2010. Lamas gave birth to their daughter Press Dahl Lamas-Richie on November 11, 2011. Lamas' second child, a son named Lyon Lamas-Richie was born via surrogate on July 4, 2015. They divorced in 2021.

== Filmography ==
- 1999: Air America as Flight attendant (1 episode)
- 2003–2005: General Hospital as Emily and Young Caroline Benson (flashbacks)
- 2006: Monster Night as Poker babe #1
- 2008: The Bachelor: London Calling as herself (contestant)
- 2008: The 13th Alley as Ashley
- 2009: Deep in the Valley as Candi
- 2009: Leave It to Lamas as Herself (all episodes, main cast)
- 2012: Couples Therapy as herself
