= The Rage (1997 film) =

1997 film by Sidney J. Furie

- U.S. release poster
- Directed by: Sidney J. Furie
- Written by: Sidney J. Furie; Greg Mellott
- Produced by: Daniel Grodnik; Peter R. Simpson; Robert Snukal
- Starring: Lorenzo Lamas; Gary Busey; Kristen Cloke; Roy Scheider; David Carradine
- Cinematography: Donald M. Morgan
- Edited by: Nick Rotundo
- Music by: Paul Zaza
- Production companies: Norstar Entertainment; Itasca Pictures
- Distributed by: Miramax; Dimension Films
- Release dates: June 1997 (International); June 16, 1998 (U.S.)
- Running time: 93 minutes
- Countries: Canada; United States
- Language: English

The Rage is a 1997 Canadian–American action-thriller film directed by Sidney J. Furie, starring Lorenzo Lamas, Gary Busey, Kristen Cloke, and Roy Scheider. The film follows a pair of FBI agents who are tasked with pursuing a murderous militia driven mad by their experiences in the Vietnam War.

The Rage was released direct-to-video in select markets in mid-1997 and the United States on June 16, 1998, with theatrical releases in some countries also in 1998. It received generally mixed-to-negative reviews from critics for its illogical plot and poor acting performances, though its action scenes received praise.

== Plot ==
In Wasatch County, Utah, a militia of psychosexual thrill-killers led by Art Dacy and his lover Cyndi commit a string of vicious rapes and murders targeting women. After the pursuit of a kidnapper hits a dead-end, FBI criminal profiler Kelly McCord is assigned to head the investigating task force and partnered with veteran agent Nick Travis to assist Sheriff Glen Dobson. Travis confides to McCord that he has become disillusioned with the FBI following his supervisor John Taggart's unnecessary deadly escalation of a standoff at Highland Gorge that Travis was attempting to resolve through crisis negotiation.

As they investigate the murders, Travis and McCord are spotted by the militia and pursued by Bobby Joe, Dacy's right-hand-man, who nearly kills McCord. Dacy, enraged at McCord's suggestion in a news interview that he is sexually impotent, kidnaps and tries to rape her, but Travis shoots him, allowing her to break free. The FBI identifies Dacy, and the task force investigates a trailer park where Dacy's mother Lucille lives. Lucille draws a gun and is shot, while Dacy, Cyndi, and Joe flee in her vehicle. McCord accidentally shoots a passing car that crashes. The car's driver files a lawsuit against the FBI, prompting Taggart to suspend McCord pending termination. Travis accuses Taggart of scapegoating McCord, incapacitates him in a brawl, and flees with her to continue the investigation.

Interviewing Dacy's former comrade Lucas McDermott at the Salt Lake Veterans Affairs Medical Center, Travis and McCord learn Dacy and his militia were previously part of the Phoenix Program, a CIA assassination squad during the Vietnam War. Dacy was emasculated by a Viet Cong prostitute that he later murdered. The crime was revealed in an exposé that prompted the CIA and Veterans Affairs to imprison and treat the Phoenix operatives' psychotic behavior. Dacy and his men subsequently declared war against women and defense officials.

A dying Lucas reveals their hideout in Cougar Canyon Wilderness to the militiaman assassin who mortally wounder him. The task force finds Dacy's taped manifesto in which he claims he will flee to Canada, before the hideout explodes. Travis and McCord deduce their escape to Canada is a feint but are detained by Taggart, before McCord steals his gun and knocks him unconscious. After escaping Taggart's custody, Travis, McCord, and Dobson learn Dacy's militia plans to attack the Bountiful Society, a remote retreat, as they host a Vietnam War reconciliation ceremony with the former Secretary of State, Secretary of Defense, and North Vietnamese Minister of Defence in attendance. As Dobson assembles a SWAT team to fight the militia, Travis reneges on a promise to be "shoulder-to-shoulder" with McCord and detains her, fearing Dacy will target her if she joins the raid, but she coaxes a civilian into freeing her after Travis and Dobson leave.

That night, the militia attacks the Bountiful Society, but Travis, Dobson, and the SWAT team intervene and kill the militiamen before they can massacre the attendees. McCord runs over Joe and is knocked out in a crash. Dacy and Cyndi abduct McCord and flee on a boat with Travis in pursuit. Travis rams his boat into Dacy's and in the ensuing fight, McCord drowns Cyndi and Travis blows up Dacy. Travis and McCord swim ashore and are held at gunpoint by Taggart who is seeking revenge against Travis for the incident at Highland Gorge which prevented his promotion. Dobson shoots Travis before he can execute McCord. Travis and McCord walk to the police lines and kiss. Intertitles reveal Travis and McCord were cleared of wrongdoing, married, and are now instructors at the FBI Academy, where "John Taggart and Art Dacy are now two-day courses in their curriculum".

== Cast ==
- Lorenzo Lamas as Nick Travis
- Gary Busey as Art Dacy
- Kristen Cloke as Kelly McCord
- Roy Scheider as John Taggart
- Brandon Smith as Sheriff Glen Dobson
- Tiani Warden as Cyndi
- Dell Yount as Bobby Joe
- David Carradine as Lucas McDermott
- David Jensen as Agent Green
- Russ McGinn as Coroner

== Production ==
=== Development ===
The Rage was announced and filmed under the preliminary title Word of Honor. The film, which contains references to the Waco and Ruby Ridge incidents, was promoted as taking inspiration from real-life FBI profilers. It was a joint venture between Canada's Norstar Entertainment and U.S. company Itasca Pictures, who had previously collaborated on The Nature of the Beast. A local press article mentioned that veteran stunt coordinator Hal Needham was involved with the film, but Spiro Razatos was ultimately in charge of action during filming.

=== Casting ===
Lorenzo Lamas, whose career had been confined to the lower rungs of genre filmmaking, viewed the project as a major step towards more legitimate roles. He voiced this belief in the press, saying: "People are going to be made aware of Lorenzo Lamas in 1997 [...] It's a real movie with a real director and a terrific script that wasn't action-driven." Trade magazine Variety reported that the actor had turned down two direct-to-video films paid US$500,000 each so that he could work on this one instead during the Renegade offseason. Lamas also cut his hair for the role, which forced him to wear a hairpiece for the series' final season. Tiani Warden, who played the girlfriend of Busey's character, was his real-life girlfriend and soon-to-be wife. She appeared in several of his projects during the 1996–97 period.

=== Filming ===
Principal photography began on May 1, 1996, and lasted five weeks. The shoot immediately followed Lamas's wedding to Shauna Sand. Filming took place in the state of Utah in Park City, Heber City, and Salt Lake City, as well as Rockport State Park, where the final boat setpiece was shot on the local reservoir. The film gave Razatos the opportunity to finally pull off his dream stunt, in which one side of a car is crushed by the wheels of a logging truck.

== Release ==
=== Theatrical ===
The film saw a theatrical release in select international markets, most notably Japan, where it opened on March 21, 1998, through Nippon Herald Films. According to Lamas, he was told the film had a good chance of going theatrical in the U.S. as well, but that did not happen.

=== Home video and digital ===
In the U.S., The Rage premiered on VHS on June 16, 1998 through Miramax's genre label Dimension. Dimension Home Video also released the film in the short-lived DivX disc format. The film had been released earlier in several international markets, such as the UK where it launched in the first week of June 1997 through BMG Video, and potentially Australia, where its classification certificate was issued in June 1997, although the date of its actual release by CEL Entertainment could not be determined. In Canada, the film was released at an undetermined date by Norstar Home Video, the sister label of production company Norstar Entertainment, through an output deal with Behaviour Distribution.

The Rage was re-issued on DVD in the U.S. on February 3, 2004, also by Dimension. In 2005, Dimension was sold by Disney, with Disney then selling off Miramax itself in 2010. Miramax and the rights to the pre-October 2005 library of Dimension were subsequently taken over by private equity firm Filmyard Holdings that same year. They temporarily sublicensed the U.S. home video rights for The Rage to Echo Bridge Entertainment, who reissued it on DVD on April 17, 2012. Echo Bridge also reissued several other Dimension and Miramax films on home video around this time. In 2011, Filmyard licensed the Miramax and pre-October 2005 Dimension library to streamer Netflix. This deal included The Rage, and ran for five years, eventually ending on June 1, 2016.

Filmyard sold Miramax and the pre-October 2005 Dimension library to Qatari company beIN Media Group during March 2016. In April 2020, ViacomCBS (now known as Paramount Skydance) acquired the rights to Miramax's library and Dimension's pre-October 2005 library, after buying a 49% stake in Miramax from beIN. As part of this 2020 deal, Paramount Pictures gained distribution rights to films produced directly by Dimension/Miramax, along with the rights to several Dimension/Miramax films produced by outside parties. However, it has not been confirmed whether or not the U.S. rights to The Rage were included in the deal, with the Dimension/Miramax rights to the film having possibly expired at some point.

In 2023, the film was released on the free ad-supported streaming service Tubi. The film was also made available on Plex, another free ad-supported streaming service, as well as on Amazon Prime and Apple TV.

== Reception ==
The Rage received mixed-to-negative reviews, with praise for the action sequences, and criticism towards Busey's character and performance.

Robert Firsching of AllMovie opined that "[t]his silly, over-the-top action film has a great hammy performance by Gary Busey" but "[t]here are way too many plot threads dangling everywhere [...] Still, those in search of mindless shootouts and hissable villains will find enough to enjoy". The British Film Institute's magazine Sight and Sound wrote that "Busey goes into grinning overdrive in an utterly shameless performance in which his anger springs from losing his manhood during sex with a Viet Cong woman." Fellow British publication Film Review stated that "if you can stomach the film's grisly details, this contains some of the most exciting action sequences seen." VideoHound's Golden Movie Retriever deemed that "good action sequences substitute for the lack of plot sense." In his syndicated column, British reviewer Peter Dean called the film "a powerful thriller".

Alan Levine of The Arizona Republic was less forgiving, and noted: "Too much emphasis on rivalries, interdepartmental politics and personal conflicts. Add to this an over-the-top performance by Gary Busey, and you got a real loser on your hands." TV Guide commented that "logic is not this film's imperative", adding that "contributing to the movie's moronic approach is the central figure of Gary Busey, a star so over-the-top he can never be taken seriously. Even if the film had better acting, The Rage would still suffer from [several] plot incredulities". In his book The American Martial Arts Film, author M. Ray Lott noted that "Lamas completely disregards his martial arts persona" and that "The Rage had all the earmarks of a big-budget film, with a superb supporting cast including Gary Busey and David Carradine in a cameo". However, he mentioned that "the story was confusing at times" and that Busey's character arc "was preposterous at best."
