= Jones v. Dirty World Entertainment Recordings LLC =

US legal case

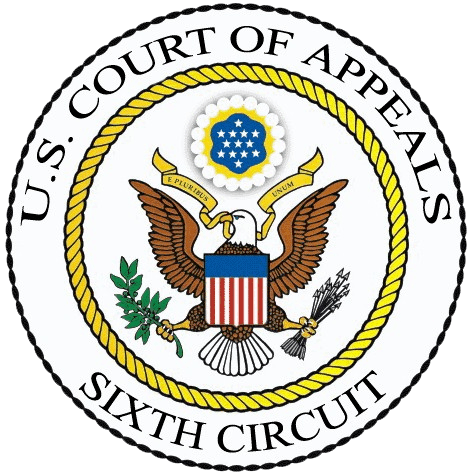
- Court: United States Court of Appeals for the Sixth Circuit
- Full case name: Sarah Jones v. Dirty World Entertainment Records LLC
- Argued: May 1, 2014
- Decided: June 16, 2014
- Citation: 755 F.3d 398 (6th Cir. 2014) http://www.ca6.uscourts.gov/opinions.pdf/14a0125p-06.pdf

Holding
- Defendants' actions immune to suit under the material contribution test.

Court membership
- Judges sitting: Ralph B. Guy, Julia Smith Gibbons, Richard Allen Griffin

Case opinions
- Majority: Gibbons

Laws applied
- Communications Decency Act section 230 immunity

Jones v. Dirty World Entertainment Recordings LLC, 755 F.3d 398 (6th Cir. 2014), is a case in which the United States Sixth Circuit Court of Appeals adopted the Roommates material development test for limiting immunity under section 230 of the Communications Decency Act (CDA). A libel suit was pursued by Sarah Jones, formerly a high school teacher and Cincinnati Ben–Gals cheerleader, against Dirty World, LLC, (Dirty World) operator of the celebrity gossip web site TheDirty.com, concerning two postings on TheDirty.com that Dirty World refused to remove.

== Background ==
TheDirty.com is a website, founded by Nik Richie, that publishes anonymous gossip from site users. In October and December 2009, two posts pictured Jones and accused her of promiscuity and infecting others with sexually transmitted diseases. Each post was authored by a site user and anonymously attributed to "The Dirty Army". An editorial note by Richie was appended and signed "nik". Jones sent several e-mails to Richie asking for the posts to be removed. Richie refused to, even after Jones hired an attorney and threatened suit.

Jones filed suit in federal district court on December 14, 2009, alleging defamation, libel per se, false light, and intentional infliction of emotional distress under state tort law. Jones was a resident of Northern Kentucky, a teacher at Dixie Heights High School in Edgewood, Kentucky and a member of the cheerleading squad of the Cincinnati Bengals professional football team. Jones initially brought suit against Dirty World Entertainment Recordings, and in August, 2010, was awarded an $11 million default judgement when the defendant failed to answer the suit. It later came to light that the plaintiff had mistakenly sued the wrong company: Dirty World Entertainment recordings operates "TheDirt.com," while the operator of the offending site ("TheDirty.com") is named DirtyWorldLLC. Jones subsequently filed an amended complaint including Dirty World, LLC.

Richie and Dirty World moved to dismiss the case for lack of personal jurisdiction, and for judgement as a matter of law, claiming that Section 230 of the CDA gave Dirty World, as a provider of interactive computer services, immunity from suit over material authored by third parties and published on the website. The district court denied these motions, concluding that a publisher, by "ratifying or adopting the posts" by addition of comments and invitation of further material would lose their immunity. The trial ended in a mistrial after the jury hung, but Jones prevailed at the second trial, winning $338,000 in combined compensatory and punitive damages. Richie and Dirty World appealed to the Sixth Circuit.

=== Parallel Developments ===
In an unusual turn of events, while her civil lawsuit remained pending, on March 29, 2012, plaintiff Sarah Jones was indicted by a Kenton County grand jury which charged her with a felony count of "Sexual abuse in the first degree" and "Unlawful use of electronic means to induce a minor to engage in sexual or other prohibited activities". On October 8, 2012, Sarah Jones pleaded guilty to felony custodial interference and misdemeanor sexual misconduct. She was given a two-year sentence, but will not have to serve any time if she follows the terms of her probation for five years. Jones' mother, former school principal Cheryl Armstrong Jones, also pleaded guilty to a misdemeanor charge of attempted tampering with evidence. She admitted to the judge that she sent the teen a text message telling him to get rid of his phone and also avoided jail time. The teen in question has publicly identified himself as 18-year-old Cody York. The same day Jones pleaded guilty in her criminal cases, Jones notified a Kentucky civil court that she was prepared to pursue her 2009 lawsuit against TheDirty.com. "Sarah Jones is only seeking damages prior to her relationship with [the high school student]," writes lawyer Eric Deters in the court filing requesting a January 2013 trial. "The conduct of thedirty.com and her reputation from the time of the libel was intact. It may be harmed now, but she does not seek damages for this time period or in the future."

== Appeal ==
On July 15, 2013, the defendants filed a timely Notice of Appeal. The district court judge, William Bertelsman, filed a Memorandum Opinion to further explain his decision. The case generated considerable interest in the reputation management industry, since it was the first time CDA was not accepted as a defense. Many feared that a successful suit by Jones open the doors to a flood of similar lawsuits. Several amicus briefs were filed with the court:

- Amicus brief by various CDA proponents: ACLU, EFF, CDT, DMLP, PPP, Wendy Seltzer and Adam Holland.
- Amicus brief by online service providers: Advanced Publications, Inc, Amazon.com, Inc., Avvo, Inc., Buzzfeed, Inc., Cable News Network, Inc., Curbed.com LLC, Gawker Media, LLC, Magazine Publishers of America, Inc., The McClatchy Company, The Reporters Committee for Freedom of the Press, TripAdvisor LLC, Yahoo! Inc, and Yelp Inc.
- Amicus brief by various interactive computer services: AOL, Inc., eBay, Inc., Facebook, Inc., Google, Inc., LinkedIn Corp., Microsoft Corp., Tumblr, Inc., Twitter, Inc., and Zynga Inc.
- Amicus brief
- Appeal from the United States District Court

=== Opinion ===
On June 16, 2014, the Sixth Circuit vacated the district court's decision with instructions to enter judgment as a matter of law in favor of Dirty World. The Sixth Circuit held that the district court erroneously applied an "adoption or ratification test" and instead adopted the material contribution test from Fair Housing Council of San Fernando Valley v. Roommates.com, LLC. The Court noted, "... determinations of immunity under the CDA should be resolved at an earlier stage of litigation," having earlier noted in the opinion that the lower court had denied Dirty World's motion to dismiss, motion for summary judgment, motion to revise judgment, motion for judgment as a matter of law, as well as their motion for leave to file an interlocutory appeal.

== See also ==
- Personal jurisdiction
- Zippo Manufacturing Co. v. Zippo Dot Com, Inc.
- Section 230
