= Revenge of the Musketeers (1963 film) =

D'Artagnan contro i tre moschettieri
- Directed by: Fulvio Tului
- Written by: Tito Carpi; Roberto Gianviti
- Starring: Fernando Lamas
- Cinematography: Oberdan Troiani
- Music by: Carlo Savina
- Distributed by: Variety Distribution
- Release date: 1963
- Country: Italy
- Language: Italian

Revenge of the Musketeers (Italian: D'Artagnan contro i tre moschettieri / D'Artagnan versus the Three Musketeers) is a 1963 Italian adventure film directed by Fulvio Tului.

== Cast ==
- Fernando Lamas as d'Artagnan
- Gloria Milland as Olimpia Mancini
- Roberto Risso as Aramis
- Walter Barnes as Porthos
- Franco Fantasia as Athos
- Folco Lulli as Cardinal Mazarin
- Andreina Paul as Queen Anne
- Gabriele Antonini as King Charles II
- Renzo Palmer
- Piero Lulli
- Ignazio Leone
- Franco Ressel
- Benito Stefanelli
