= Bobb Hopkins =

American writer, director, actor, and producer

Bobb Hopkins, also known as Santa Fe Bo, is an American writer, director, actor, and producer who was founding director of the National Hobo Association.

== Early life and education ==
Hopkins was born in Lynn, Massachusetts, and attended Swampscott High School. He graduated from the University of New Hampshire with a degree in mathematics. Known at the time as Bob Hopkins, he was voted the top quarterback in the conference in the 1970 season.

== Career ==
Hopkins has appeared in more than 25 movies and TV shows as an actor. He founded Super Chief Films in 1978 and has since produced, written, and directed 8 documentaries and movies. Additionally, he has written 27 screenplays.

== National Hobo Association ==
Hopkins was founding director of the National Hobo Association, an organization devoted to the hobo lifestyle. He authored the group's 1988 Hobo Travel Guide and was the first editor of the Hobo Times. Hopkins first rode the rails from Boston to California to seek his fortune as an actor; he later did so recreationally with his wife, Karna. Former NHA members include Pulitzer Prize winning author, James A. Michener; country music legends, Merle Haggard and Roger Miller; notorious attorney, Melvin Belli, British rockers, Supertramp; actors, Ernest Borgnine, Rob Lowe and Christian Slater.

== Selected filmography ==
- The American Hobo (2003)
- Rail Kings (2004)
- 3 Below (2006)
- The 13th Alley (2008)
- The American Hobo (1996)
- Skin Deep (1989)
- Airwolf (1984/85)
- T.J. Hooker (1984)
- Simon & Simon (1984)
- Knight Rider (1984)
- Scarecrow and Mrs. King (1984)
- CHiPs (1981)
- General Hospital (1981-82)
- Fantasy Island (1980)
- The Great American Lumberjack (1980)
- The Great American Hobo (1979)
