= Are You Hot? =

- Genre: Reality
- Presented by: JD Roberto
- Judges: Lorenzo Lamas; Rachel Hunter; Randolph Duke
- Country of origin: United States
- Original language: English
- No. of seasons: 1
- No. of episodes: 6

Production
- Producer: Mike Fleiss
- Production companies: AND Syndicated Productions; Next Entertainment; Telepictures Productions

Original release
- Network: ABC
- Release: February 13 – March 20, 2003

Are You Hot?: The Search for America's Sexiest People is an American reality television series that premiered February 13, 2003 on ABC. A panel of judges including Lorenzo Lamas, Rachel Hunter, and Randolph Duke evaluated contestants on the sole criterion of their physical attractiveness. It was cancelled after one season due to low ratings.

The winning man and woman of the lone season were David Maxwell from San Diego and Chantille Boudousque from New Orleans.

While aired on prime time, many male contestants appearing bare-chested were censored at times due to lower body hair being exposed.

== Format ==
From coast to coast, thousands of participants gathered to get the chance to compete for the crown of the "sexiest man or woman" in America. Talent, personality and strategy are not required, only physical beauty and "innate sexiness". TV viewers had their chance to vote on the Hot Zone/Round One participants from each region as they face a celebrity panel of experts including: Rachel Hunter, Randolph Duke and Lorenzo Lamas.

== Lawsuit ==
A lawsuit filed by Howard Stern and his production company claimed that the premise and format of Are You Hot? was lifted from the Stern radio show's regular segment The Evaluators as former Stern TV producer Scott Einziger was a producer and exec on Are You Hot?

ABC and Stern settled the suit since the ABC/Einziger version of the show was a ratings failure.

== Parodies ==
In 2003, the series was spoofed by SNL for its "TV Funhouse" segment as Are You Hot?: The Search For America's Sexiest Cartoons, in which a 2D version of Lorenzo Lamas judges 11 popular cartoon characters, including Betty Boop, Popeye, Cinderella, Olive Oyl, Strawberry Shortcake, Droopy, Marvin the Martian, Dagwood, Optimus Prime, Yosemite Sam, and Barney Rubble.
