= The 13th Alley =

2008 independent horror film

- Release poster
- Directed by: Bobb Hopkins
- Written by: Bobb Hopkins
- Starring: Robert Carradine; Shayne Lamas
- Music by: Amanda Abizaid
- Release date: June 13, 2008 (Portland)
- Running time: 81 minutes
- Country: United States
- Language: English

The 13th Alley is a 2008 independent horror film directed by Bobb Hopkins. The film had its premiere at the 2008 Portland Underground Film Festival on June 13, 2008. The film stars Robert Carradine and Shayne Lamas, and centers around two college students who go to a bowling alley, only for strange things to start occurring.

== Cast ==
- Robert Carradine as Hal
- Randy Wayne as Matt
- Bobb Hopkins as Zeke
- Shayne Lamas as Ashley

== Release ==
The 13th Alley was self-published to DVD on December 10, 2009 directly through the film's website. Dread Central reviewed the movie, writing: "Simply put, The 13th Alley may very well be one of the worst movies of all time. It's simply awful, really awful, 'Oh, my god, I cannot believe I saw this in a theater' awful; the kind of awful that actually transcends awfulness and becomes entertaining in spite of itself. This is one for the ages. I haven't laughed out loud this much at a movie in a long time."
