= The Bachelor (American TV series) season 12 =

The Bachelor
- Season 12
- Starring: Matt Grant
- Presented by: Chris Harrison
- No. of contestants: 25
- Winner: Shayne Lamas
- Runner-up: Chelsea Wanstrath
- No. of episodes: 9 (including 1 special)

Release
- Original network: ABC
- Original release: March 17 – May 12, 2008

Season chronology
- ← Previous; Season 11 Next → Season 13

The Bachelor: London Calling is the twelfth season of ABC reality television series The Bachelor. The season premiere aired on March 17, 2008, and features Matt Grant, a 27-year-old British global financer, courting 25 women from the United States. The season concluded on May 12, 2008, with Grant choosing to propose to 22-year-old actress Shayne Lamas. The couple ended their relationship months later.

This was the final season to be aired in 90 minutes.

== Matt Grant ==
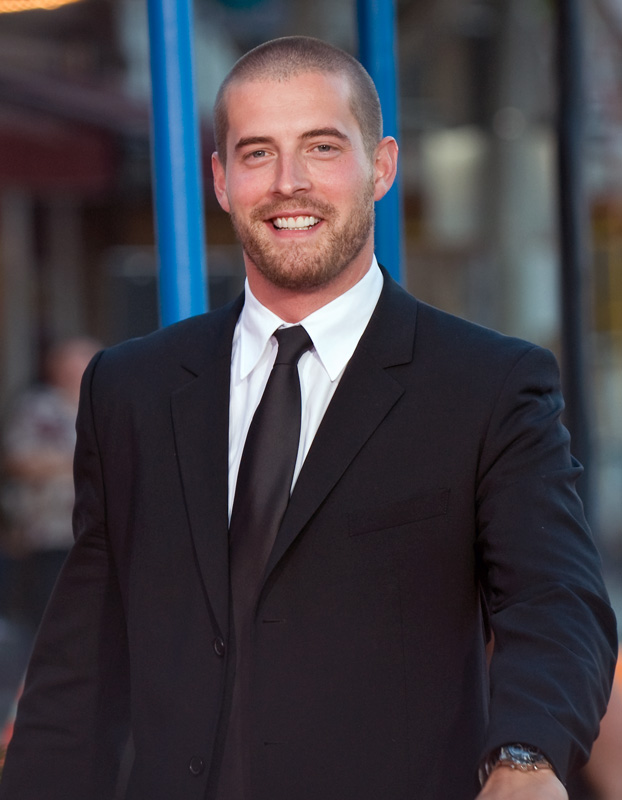
Matt Grant

He was an English financier and business development manager from London and worked at Lombard Asset Finance (RBS) in Cambridge for three years before moving to London. Grant received a B.A. in modern history and politics from Anglia Polytechnic University in Cambridge.

== Contestants ==
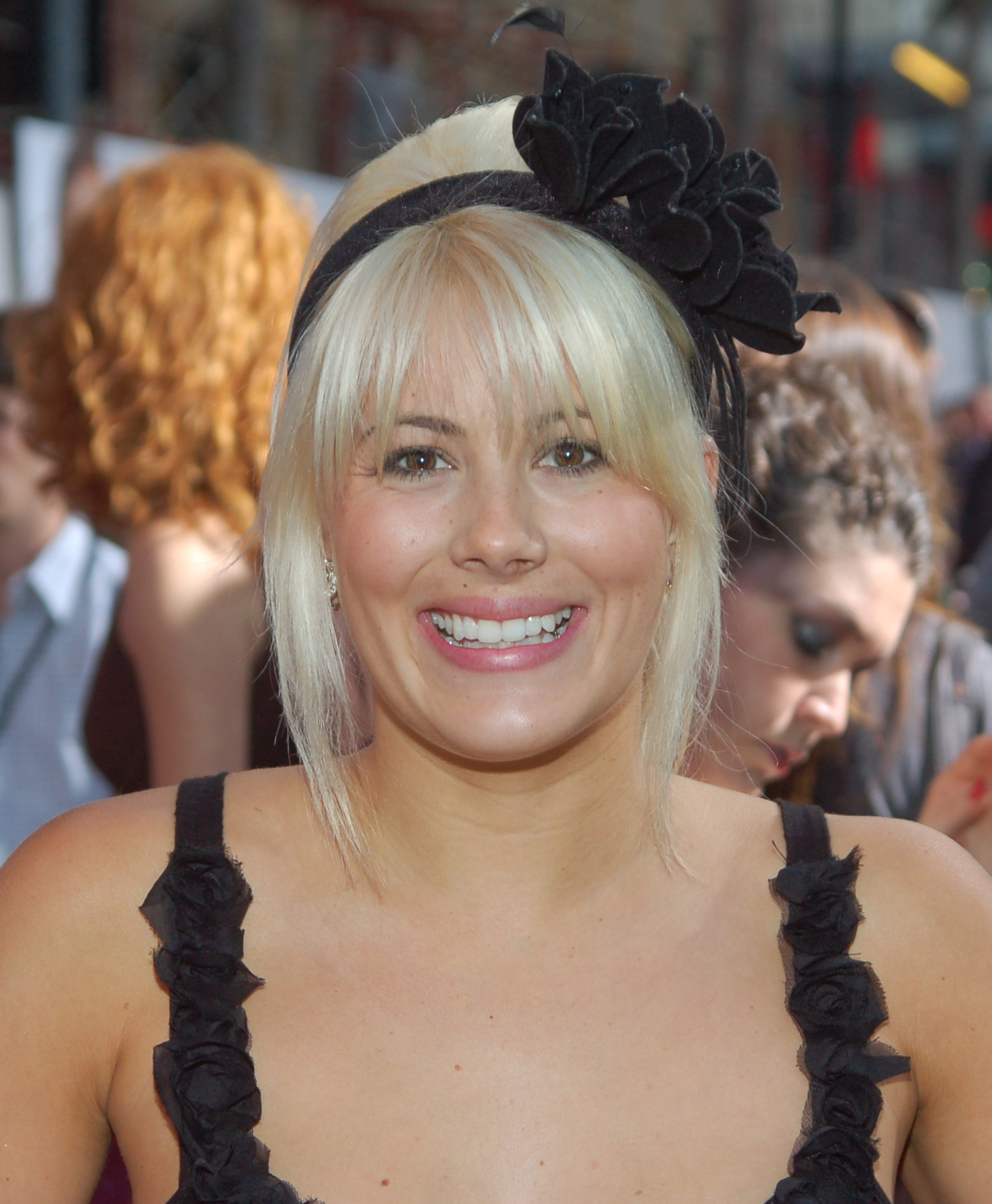
Shayne Lamas

Biographical information according to ABC official series site, plus footnoted additions

Name	Age	Hometown	Occupation	Outcome	Place
Shayne Lamas	22	Malibu, California	Actress	Winner	1
Chelsea Wanstrath	25	Durango, Colorado	Pharmaceutical Sales Rep	Runner-up	2
Amanda Rantuccio	27	Niceville, Florida	Account Executive	Week 7	3
Noelle Drake	26	Loveland, Colorado	Photographer	Week 6	4
Marshana Ritchie	27	Brooklyn, New York	Fashion designer	Week 5	5–6
Robin Canfield	22	Holland, Michigan	Advertising coordinator	Week 5	5–6
Ashlee Williss	22	Jacksonville Beach, Florida	Singer-Songwriter	Week 4	7–8
Kelly Hark	25	Hollywood, California	Medical sales representative	Week 4	7–8
Holly Durst	24	Suffield, Ohio	Children's Book Author	Week 4	9
Amy Bean	22	Stockton, California	Nanny	Week 3	10–12
Erin Storm	33	San Marcos, California	Vendor	Week 3	10–12
Kristine Heffelfinger	33	Dillsburg, Pennsylvania	Personal Trainer	Week 3	10–12
Caroline "Carri" Perrier	25	Oklahoma City, Oklahoma	Church Marketing Rep	Week 2	13–15
Erin Harper	25	Seattle, Washington	Event Planner	Week 2	13–15
Michelle Procopio	28	Syracuse, New York	Administrative Assistant	Week 2	13–15
Alyssa Johnson	24	Boise, Idaho	Biology Student	Week 1	16–25
Amanda Peterman	26	Cape Girardeau, Missouri	Law student	Week 1	16–25
Denise Gitsham	30	Washington, D.C.	Attorney/Former White House Aide	Week 1	16–25
Devon Grisham	24	Austin, Texas	Makeup Artist	Week 1	16–25
Lesley Geyer	23	Tampa, Florida	Youth Minister	Week 1	16–25
Michele Romero	33	Laguna Niguel, California	Interior Designer	Week 1	16–25
Rebecca LeBlanc	30	Alamo, California	Attorney	Week 1	16–25
Stacey Elza	26	Chicago, Illinois	Graduate Student	Week 1	16–25
Tamara Marco	23	Beverly Hills, California	Cocktail Waitress	Week 1	16–25
Tiffany Hickenbottom	33	San Francisco, California	Real Estate Marketing Rep	Week 1	16–25

=== Future appearances ===
==== Bachelor Pad ====
Holly Durst returned in the second season of Bachelor Pad and won that season alongside Bachelor Nation alumnus Michael Stagliano.

== Call-out order ==
Order	Bachelorettes	Week							
Order	Bachelorettes	1	2	3	4	5	6	7	8
1	Amanda R.	Amanda R.	Ashlee	Holly	Chelsea	Shayne	Shayne	Shayne	Shayne
2	Amy	Chelsea	Chelsea	Robin	Amanda R.	Noelle	Amanda R.	Chelsea	Chelsea
3	Devon	Shayne	Robin	Shayne	Marshana	Chelsea	Chelsea	Amanda R.	
4	Kristine	Michelle P.	Holly	Amanda R.	Shayne	Amanda R.	Noelle		
5	Chelsea	Marshana	Erin S.	Ashlee	Robin	Marshana; Robin			
6	Erin H.	Ashlee	Amanda R.	Kelly	Noelle	Marshana; Robin			
7	Kelly	Noelle	Kelly	Chelsea	Ashlee; Kelly				
8	Rebecca	Erin S.	Amy	Noelle	Ashlee; Kelly				
9	Denise	Amy	Kristine	Marshana	Holly				
10	Erin S.	Kristine	Marshana	Amy; Erin S. Kristine					
11	Robin	Robin	Noelle	Amy; Erin S. Kristine					
12	Ashlee	Kelly	Shayne	Amy; Erin S. Kristine					
13	Alyssa	Carri	Carri; Erin H. Michelle P.						
14	Michelle P.	Holly	Carri; Erin H. Michelle P.						
15	Shayne	Erin H.	Carri; Erin H. Michelle P.						
16	Marshana	Alyssa; Amanda P. Denise; Devon; Lesley; Michele R. Rebecca; Stacey; Tamara; Tiffany							
17	Amanda P.	Alyssa; Amanda P. Denise; Devon; Lesley; Michele R. Rebecca; Stacey; Tamara; Tiffany							
18	Tamara	Alyssa; Amanda P. Denise; Devon; Lesley; Michele R. Rebecca; Stacey; Tamara; Tiffany							
19	Holly	Alyssa; Amanda P. Denise; Devon; Lesley; Michele R. Rebecca; Stacey; Tamara; Tiffany							
20	Tiffany	Alyssa; Amanda P. Denise; Devon; Lesley; Michele R. Rebecca; Stacey; Tamara; Tiffany							
21	Carri	Alyssa; Amanda P. Denise; Devon; Lesley; Michele R. Rebecca; Stacey; Tamara; Tiffany							
22	Stacey	Alyssa; Amanda P. Denise; Devon; Lesley; Michele R. Rebecca; Stacey; Tamara; Tiffany							
23	Lesley	Alyssa; Amanda P. Denise; Devon; Lesley; Michele R. Rebecca; Stacey; Tamara; Tiffany							
24	Michele R.	Alyssa; Amanda P. Denise; Devon; Lesley; Michele R. Rebecca; Stacey; Tamara; Tiffany							
25	Noelle	Alyssa; Amanda P. Denise; Devon; Lesley; Michele R. Rebecca; Stacey; Tamara; Tiffany							

The contestant received the first impression rose
The contestant received a rose during the date
The contestant was eliminated
The contestant was eliminated during the date
The contestant won the competition

== Episodes ==
No. overall	No. in season	Title	Original release date	Prod. code	U.S. viewers (millions)	Rating/share (18–49)
99	1	"Week 1"	March 17, 2008	1201	8.58	3.2/8
100	2	"Week 2"	March 24, 2008	1202	7.27	2.6/7
101	3	"Week 3"	March 31, 2008	1203	7.67	2.7/7
102	4	"Week 4"	April 7, 2008	1204	6.83	2.5/6
103	5	"Week 5"	April 14, 2008	1205	6.60	2.5/6
104	6	"Week 6: Hometowns"	April 21, 2008	1206	7.30	2.6/7
105	7	"Week 7: Fantasy Suites"	April 28, 2008	1207	7.17	2.5/6
106	8	"The Women Tell All"	May 5, 2008	N/A	6.57	2.3/6
107	9	"Week 8: Season Finale"	May 12, 2008	1208	8.85	3.2/8
