= CIA Code Name: Alexa =

- Directed by: Joseph Merhi
- Written by: Ken Lamplugh; John Weidner
- Produced by: PM Entertainment Group
- Starring: Lorenzo Lamas; Kathleen Kinmont; O.J. Simpson
- Cinematography: Richard Pepin
- Music by: Louis Febre
- Release date: September 24, 1992
- Running time: 93 minutes
- Country: United States
- Language: English

CIA Code Name: Alexa is a 1992 action film, starring O.J. Simpson, Lorenzo Lamas, and his then wife Kathleen Kinmont. It was directed by Joseph Merhi. It was followed by a sequel, CIA II: Target Alexa (1993).

== Plot ==
CIA Special Agent Mark Graver (Lorenzo Lamas) is a man of action. Graver gets the assignment of a lifetime when he goes up against a gang of terrorists led by Victor Mahler (Alex Cord). These terrorists shoot up churches and kill cops. They want a microchip with nuclear weapons information. To get them, Mahler must get a hold of “The Microchip!”

== Cast ==
- Lorenzo Lamas as CIA Agent Mark Graver
- Kathleen Kinmont as Alexa
- O.J. Simpson as Detective Nick Murphy
- Alex Cord as Victor Mahler
- Pamela Dixon as CIA Chief Robin (Credited as Pam Dixon)
- Jeff Griggs as Detective Benedetti
- Michael Bailey Smith as Vlad
- Stephen Quadros as Max Mahler
- Shonna Cobb as Tanya
- Clayton Staggs as Captain O'Neil
- H. Ray Huff as Commander
- Dan Tullis Jr. as Terrorist
- Charles Meshack as Reverend
- Jim Ishida as Guest
