= Lois Foraker =

American actress

Lois Foraker is an American film, stage and television actress. She was in the original Broadway cast of Godspell in 1976. She has appeared in such television series as M*A*S*H, AfterMASH, and The West Wing, as well as in the pilot episode of Northern Exposure.

== Filmography ==
- Dirty Harry (1971) - Hot Mary (uncredited)
- The Candidate (1972) - Large Girl
- The Crazy World of Julius Vrooder (1974) - Delivery Girl
- The Four Deuces (1975) - Blonde Singer
- Getting Wasted (1980) - Nurse
- Gremlins (1984) - Bank teller
- The Exorcist III (1990) - Nurse Merrin
- Child's Play 3 (1991) - Sgt. Frazier
- Radio Flyer (1992) - Aunt

== Television appearances ==
- The West Wing (2001)
- The X-Files (1999)
- 3rd Rock from the Sun (1996)
- The Larry Sanders Show (1995)
- Untamed Love (1994)
- Rachel Gunn, R.N. (1992)
- Night Court (1990)
- Northern Exposure (1990)
- St. Elsewhere (1986–87)
- Murder, She Wrote (1984, 1988)
- Hart to Hart (1984) - Sister Mary
- AfterMASH (1983)
- Newhart (1982)
- M*A*S*H (1976–78)
- If Tomorrow Comes (1986)
- My Boyfriend's Back (1989) TV movie
