= Jivaro (film) =

1954 film by Edward Ludwig

- Directed by: Edward Ludwig
- Written by: Winston Miller
- Story by: David Duncan
- Produced by: William H. Pine; William C. Thomas
- Starring: Fernando Lamas; Rhonda Fleming; Brian Keith
- Cinematography: Lionel Lindon
- Edited by: Howard Smith
- Music by: Gregory Stone
- Color process: Technicolor
- Production company: Pine-Thomas Productions
- Distributed by: Paramount Pictures
- Release date: February 12, 1954
- Running time: 91 minutes
- Country: United States
- Language: English

Jivaro (also known as Lost Treasure of the Amazon) is a 1954 American 3D adventure film directed by Edward Ludwig and starring Fernando Lamas, Rhonda Fleming and Brian Keith. Publicity material for the film translates Jivaro as "headhunters of the Amazon". Originally filmed in 3D, due to a decline in interest Jivaro was not presented in that format in its original 1954 theatrical release. It finally had its 3D debut on September 17, 2006, at "The World 3-D Expo" in Hollywood.

== Plot ==
Alice Parker arrives at the Brazilian trading outpost of Rio Galdez in search of her fiancé, an alcoholic engineer who has ventured into dangerous Jívaro territory on a quest for gold.

== Cast ==
- Fernando Lamas as Rio Galdez
- Rhonda Fleming as Alice Parker
- Brian Keith as Tony
- Lon Chaney Jr. as Pedro Martines (as Lon Chaney)
- Richard Denning as Jerry Russell
- Rita Moreno as Maroa
- Marvin Miller as Jivaro Chief Kovanti
- Morgan Farley as Vinny
- Pascual García Peña as Sylvester, Rio's aide
- Nestor Paiva as Jacques
- Charles Lung as The Padre (as Charlie Lung)

== Production ==
In April 1952, Pine-Thomas Productions announced they had bought the novel Morro Treasure by David Duncan and hired Duncan to write the script.

The film was known as Lost Treasure of the Amazon. In August John Payne was announced as star as part of a two-picture contract with Pine Thomas, the other being High Voltage. Payne ended up not appearing in the film and High Voltage was never made.

Rhonda Fleming and Fernando Lamas were cast in April 1953.
