= Rose Marie (1954 film) =

1954 film by Mervyn LeRoy

- Directed by: Mervyn LeRoy
- Written by: Ronald Millar; George Froeschel
- Based on: Rose-Marie; 1924 operetta by: Otto Harbach; Oscar Hammerstein II
- Produced by: Mervyn LeRoy
- Starring: Ann Blyth; Howard Keel; Fernando Lamas
- Cinematography: Paul C. Vogel
- Edited by: Harold F. Kress
- Music by: George Stoll
- Production company: Metro-Goldwyn-Mayer
- Distributed by: Loew's Inc.
- Release date: March 3, 1954 (Chicago)
- Running time: 104 minutes
- Country: United States
- Language: English
- Budget: $2,984,000
- Box office: $5,277,000

Rose Marie is a 1954 American musical Western film adaptation of the 1924 operetta of the same name. It is the third adaptation to be filmed by Metro-Goldwyn-Mayer (MGM), following a 1928 silent film and the 1936 film starring Jeanette MacDonald and Nelson Eddy. It is directed by Mervyn LeRoy and stars Ann Blyth, Howard Keel and Fernando Lamas.

This version is filmed in the Canadian Rockies in CinemaScope. It was MGM's first US produced film in the new widescreen medium (having been preceded by the British-produced Knights of the Round Table), and the first movie musical of any studio to be released in this format. It was part of a revival of large-budget operetta films produced during the mid-1950s. The story adheres closely to that of the original libretto, unlike the 1936 version. It is somewhat altered by a tomboy-to-lady conversion for the title character.

== Plot ==
Mike Malone, an officer of the Royal Canadian Mounted Police (the "Mounties"), spots Rose Marie Lemaitre, a French Canadian orphan intent on living in the woods, near a river. Rose Marie sails away but Mike apprehends her, believing the wilderness is not an ideal place for a woman. He brings Rose Marie to Fort Macroy, where she behaves rebelliously to the point Mike locks Rose Marie inside the brig. He appoints Barney McCorkle, a veteran corporal, to monitor her.

Over time, Rose Marie join the Mounties. Inspector Appleby arrives to inspect Mike's cavalry, and Appleby reprimands Mike for allowing a woman into the ranks. Mike admits he has always seen Rose Marie as a child. Appleby has Rose Marie sent to Maple Rock over her objections. She runs into the woods, where Mike follows her and explains she will become a respectable woman.

Along their way, they encounter James, a fur tapper. As they are talking, a cougar startles Rose Marie's horse and the cougar is later killed. Mike takes Rose Marie to Maple Rock, and places her under Lady Jane Dunstock's care. After some time, Mike falls in love with Rose Marie, but struggles to write back a letter. Meanwhile, Lady Jane trains Rose Marie on her ballroom dancing. She then sees James outside the window, and invites him to the charity dance later that night.

James arrives at an indigenous village and greets Wanda. He pays Chief Black Eagle $400 he requested for a piece of land near Peace River, but Chief Eagle doubles the price. James vows to pay and robs the charity dance only to return it. Late in the night, Rose Marie runs into the woods and finds James, and they begin to fall in love. The next day, James proposes to the chief he gives him the land in exchange for half of the gold he expects to mine, but Black Eagle refuses. Mike waits outside when James leaves the village, and warns him to stay away from Rose Marie.

Mike returns to Maple Rock to see Rose Marie, and proposes to her. Rose Marie is unsure at first, but Mike kisses her and asks her to consider. Shortly after, James forcibly takes Rose Marie to an indigenous totem summer ceremony. Wanda spots them together and becomes jealous. James brings Rose Marie home and invites her to a fur trapping expedition. At James's log cabin, Wanda sneaks in and prepares to stab James, until he is called outside by Rose Marie. She agrees to meet James at Golden Rock the next day.

Wanda returns to the village, where Black Eagle whips her for seeing James. Wanda fights back and kills the chief. Mike investigates the murder, in which Rose Marie identifies the knife as James's. Later that night, Mike finds the village has James tied to the stake, and bargains to have James released so he can be prosecuted. During the trial, James is found guilty of murder and sentenced to be hanged.

Rose Marie pleads with Mike expressing James's innocence and her love towards him, which stuns Mike. At the prison cell, Mike and Barney find Wanda's love ring among James's belongings, and has Wanda confess to the murder whereby James is released from prison. At the fort, Barney is promoted to sergeant. Mike informs Rose Marie that James has been freed. In gratitude, Rose Marie tells Mike she will do anything he wants. However, Mike understands Rose Marie is not meant for town life and sends her off to be with James.

== Cast ==
- Ann Blyth as Rose Marie Lemaitre
- Howard Keel as Captain Mike Malone
- Fernando Lamas as James Severn Duval
- Bert Lahr as Barney McCorkle
- Marjorie Main as Lady Jane Dunstock
- Joan Taylor as Wanda
- Ray Collins as Inspector Appleby
- Chief Yowlachie as Black Eagle

== Soundtrack ==
Only three numbers are retained from the original musical: "Rose Marie", "Indian Love Call", and "The Mounties". Five new songs were written for the film: "The Right Place For A Girl", "Free To Be Free", "The Mountie Who Never Got His Man", "I Have The Love", and "Love And Kisses". The latter was filmed, but deleted from the release print (it is included on the DVD version of the film). An Indian totem dance with choreography by Busby Berkeley (his last) takes the place of the original number "Totem Tom Tom". This new number does not make use of that song's music or lyric, despite a claim otherwise on the DVD cover.

== Reception ==
According to MGM records, Rose Marie earned $2,835,000 in the US and Canada and $2,442,000 elsewhere, resulting in a loss of $284,000.
