= National Hobo Association =

The National Hobo Association is an organization for enthusiasts of the hobo lifestyle, founded in Los Angeles as part of a "hobo revival" in the US in the late 1970s and 1980s. It was last headquartered in Nisswa, Minnesota.

The National Hobo Association was founded in 1977 by actor Bobb Hopkins and others in Los Angeles who were interested in the hobo lifestyle as a hobby, and was part of a romantic interest in hoboes during the Ronald Reagan administration. The group had approximately 2,000 members nationwide in 1987, approximately 3,000 in 1990, 3,800 in 1991, when 100 people attended its annual regional convention in San Francisco, and 4,500 in 1992. One recreational hobo attended NHA gatherings by corporate jet. In 1992 it endorsed Ross Perot's candidacy for President of the US.

From November 1987 until 2000 the NHA published the Hobo Times, which appeared bimonthly and was also read by full-time hoboes; it included articles such as "Seeing America on Zero Dollars a Day", "Mulligan Stew Recipes", "The Glossary of Hobo Vernacular", "The 10 Most Scenic Train Rides", and "The Slowest Freights in the Land". Hopkins was the first editor; it was later edited by Garth Bishop.

By 1999, yuppies were less inclined to ride the rails for fun because of the hunt for Rafael Resendez Ramirez, whose serial murders in railroad towns had given hoboing a bad name. Edwin C. "Buzz" Potter, who had helped found The Hobo Times, was then its editor and president of the National Hobo Association, which under his leadership organized a Hobo Festival in Elko, Nevada in 2000. Bud Webster's "The Ballad of Kansas McGriff" won the poetry contest; he read it to an audience of 5,000 attendees. The last known headquarters for the organization was Nisswa, Minnesota.
