= Lorenzo Lamas =

American actor (born 1958)

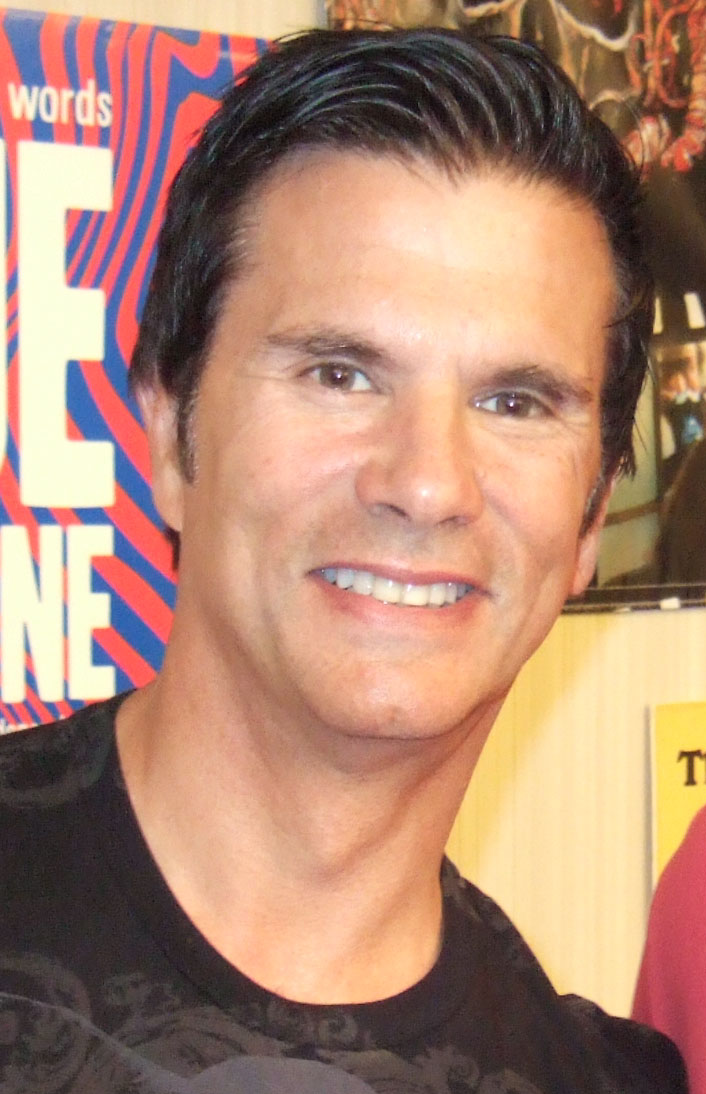
- Lamas in 2013
- Born: Lorenzo Fernando Lamas; January 20, 1958 (age 68); Santa Monica, California, U.S.
- Occupation: Actor
- Years active: 1969–present
- Spouses: Victoria Hilbert (m. 1981; div. 1982); Michele Smith (m. 1983; div. 1985); Kathleen Kinmont (m. 1989; div. 1993); Shauna Sand (m. 1996; div. 2002); Shawna Craig (m. 2011; div. 2018); Kenna Scott (m. 2023; sep. 2025)
- Partners: Daphne Ashbrook (1986–1988); Heather Locklear (2026–present)
- Children: 6, including AJ and Shayne Lamas
- Parent(s): Fernando Lamas; Arlene Dahl

Lorenzo Fernando Lamas (born January 20, 1958) is an American actor. He is widely known for his role of Lance Cumson, the irresponsible grandson of Angela Channing—played by Jane Wyman—in the prime time hit Falcon Crest (1981–1990), for which he received a Golden Globe Award nomination for Best Supporting Actor – Series, Miniseries or Television Film.

Lamas is also known for his roles as Reno Raines in the crime drama series Renegade (1992–1997), Dr. Hollywood on the Nickelodeon TV show Big Time Rush (2009–2013), Hector Ramirez in the soap opera The Bold and the Beautiful (2004–2006), and Meap on the television show Phineas and Ferb. He served as a judge on ABC television's Are You Hot?, and starred in his own reality show, Leave It to Lamas, a series about his real-life family.

As an executive producer, he worked on such films as: Night of the Warrior (1991, starring himself, his wife Kathleen Kinmont and his mother, Arlene Dahl), Ulterior Motives (1993, starring: Thomas Ian Griffith, Mary Page Keller and Ken Howard), and Mom and Dad Save the World (1992, starring: Teri Garr, Jeffrey Jones and Jon Lovitz).

== Early life ==
Lamas was born in Santa Monica, California, the son of Argentine actor Fernando Lamas and Norwegian American actress Arlene Dahl. He is the stepson of swimmer and film star Esther Williams, who married his father when Lamas was 11 years old. Both Williams and Dahl were best friends of actress Jane Wyman (who knew him from birth), and would later work alongside Lamas on Falcon Crest. He was brought up in Pacific Palisades, California, and moved to New York City in 1971. In 1979, he took up Taekwondo, earning a third-degree black belt, also Shotokan Karate, Ju jitsu and Aikido, earning black belts in each. He graduated from the Admiral Farragut Academy in Pine Beach, New Jersey, in 1975.

== Career ==
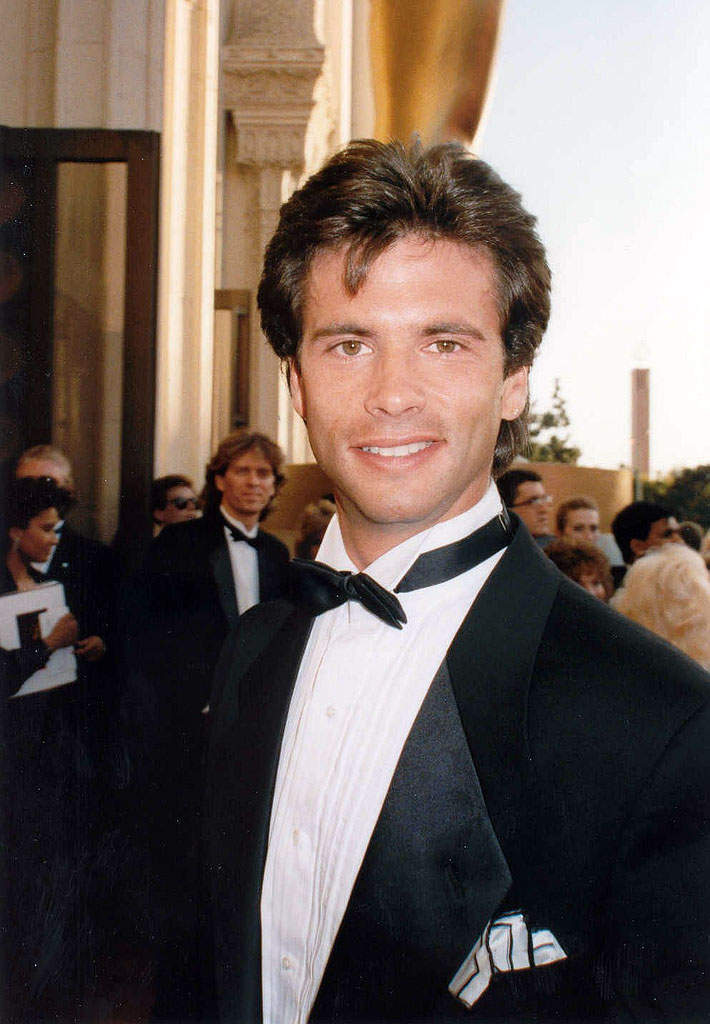
Lamas at the 1989 Academy Awards

=== Early career ===
Lamas had longed to be in show business since the age of five, when he approached his mother and said, "I want to be a star...I mean, an actor." With a smile, she replied, "I heard you the first time, son."

Lamas first studied acting in Tony Barr's Film Actors Workshop and quickly thereafter obtained his first TV acting role in 1976. As a last-minute replacement for Steven Ford, Lamas secured a non-speaking role as a jock in the 1978 musical film Grease, in which he dyed his hair blond. In the late 1970s and early 1980s, Lamas had guest-starring roles in a number of TV series including: Switch, Sword of Justice, Dear Detective, Secrets of Midland Heights, Fantasy Island, The Love Boat and Hotel.

=== Falcon Crest (1981–1990) ===
In 1980, Lamas auditioned for and won the role of Lance Cumson, for the pilot of a new series entitled The Vintage Years. The pilot was later retooled to become the hit prime time drama series Falcon Crest, which aired on CBS for nine seasons from December 4, 1981, to May 17, 1990. During a 2006 TV interview with a Norwegian television team, Lamas said that to get the role he had auditioned twice and beat out five other actors for the part. Lamas was nominated for a Golden Globe and two Soap Opera Digest Awards for his work on the series; he was the only actor to appear in all 227 episodes.

During his tenure on the show, Lamas had the lead role in the poorly received film Body Rock (1984), where he was nominated for a Golden Raspberry Award for Worst Actor. He also performed a song on the film's soundtrack, and the track "Fools Like Me" became his only single to date to crack the Billboard Hot 100 chart, peaking at #85. The co-founder of the Golden Raspberry Awards, John J. B. Wilson, later named Body Rock as one of "The 100 Most Enjoyably Bad Movies Ever Made".

=== Later career ===
Lamas began carving out a niche for himself as an action-hero, showcasing his martial-arts skills by starring in such movies as the Snake Eater trilogy (1989–1992), Bounty Tracker (1993), Gladiator Cop (1995), Terminal Justice (1996), and many similar low-budget action-films. From 1992 to 1997, Lamas played the lead role of Reno Raines (a falsely accused cop) in the syndicated series Renegade, which allowed him to exercise his enthusiasm for Harley-Davidson motorcycles as well as martial arts. The show was seen in over 100 countries, and during its fifth and final season, it moved from first-run syndication to the USA Network. Lamas had been keeping his hair long (past his shoulders) during this time, so when he had it cut short following the end of the fourth season of Renegade, he had to wear a long-haired wig for filming of the final season. In 2004, Lamas joined the soap opera The Bold and the Beautiful as Hector Ramirez, remaining on the show until 2006.

In August 2007, Lamas starred as the King of Siam in The King and I at the Ogunquit Playhouse in Ogunquit, Maine. That fall, he performed at Kean University Premiere Stages in Union, New Jersey, in the title role in Steven Dietz's Dracula. In June 2008, he performed as El Gallo in The Fantasticks at the Casa Mañana Theatre in Fort Worth, Texas. In June 2009, Lamas returned to the Ogunquit Playhouse as Zach in A Chorus Line.

In 2015, Lamas was a cast member of the reality TV series The Celebrity Apprentice.

As of 2016, Lamas was working as a helicopter pilot, flying people on day trips to the Grand Canyon from Los Angeles. According to his Twitter account, he is currently flying as a helicopter tour pilot with HeliNY in New York City. In 2023, he posted that he was working as a safety manager for Vezer Industrial.

== Personal life ==
Lamas has been married six times and has six children. His first marriage was to Victoria Hilbert (1981–1982). His second marriage (1983–1985) was to his publicist, Michele Cathy Smith, with whom he had two children: son Alvaro Joshua "A.J." (b. 1983) and daughter Shayne (b. 1985), both actors. Lamas was then in a relationship with actress Daphne Ashbrook; the couple had a daughter Paton Lee Ashbrook.

Lamas was married to his third wife, Renegade co-star Kathleen Kinmont, from 1989 to 1993. Playmate of the Month Shauna Sand (who made guest appearances in Renegade) became Lamas' fourth wife in 1996. The couple had three daughters before divorcing in 2002.

After five months of dating, Lamas married his fifth wife, Shawna Craig, 2011 in Cabo San Lucas, Mexico. He told reporters that he would change his name to Lorenzo Lamas-Craig. This decision was motivated by the fact that his previous wife, Shauna, kept the surname Lamas, and is legally named Shauna Lamas, and new bride Shawna, whose given name is a homonym and almost identical to that of Shauna, did not wish to have a virtually identical full name. Shawna Craig was also a surrogate who carried Lamas' grandson after Shayne suffered a miscarriage and Shayne could never carry a baby again. Craig gave birth to the baby boy on July 4, 2015. In June 2018, Lamas filed for divorce from his fifth wife citing irreconcilable differences.

Lamas started dating Kenna Scott in April 2020. The couple got engaged in Las Vegas in February 2021. The wedding was on October 29, 2023, at the Wonderland on the cruise ship Wonder of the Seas. In June 2025, it was reported that Lamas had filed for divorce.

Lamas enjoyed close friendships with his Falcon Crest co-stars Ana Alicia and Jane Wyman. He continually praised Wyman's professionalism and credited her as a "huge influence" on his life and career. After Wyman's death in 2007, Lamas released a statement: "Next to my parents, Jane was the most influential person in my young career. She has left an incredible body of work and accomplishments that cannot go without being recognized and celebrated. I will miss her greatly."

Lamas' stepmother, Esther Williams, died on June 6, 2013, at the age of 91, in Los Angeles, California. He stated on Twitter: "The best swim teacher and soul mom RIP."

Lamas published his autobiography, Renegade at Heart (co-written by celebrity biographer Jeff Lenburg) in December 2014.

== Filmography ==
=== Films ===
Year	Title	Role	Notes
1969	100 Rifles	Indian Boy	Film debut; uncredited
1978	Grease	Tom Chisum	
1979	Take Down	Nick Kilvitus	
1979	Tilt	Casey Silverwater	
1979	Promises in the Dark	Josh	Uncredited
1984	Body Rock	"Chilly"	Nominated – Golden Raspberry Award for Worst Actor
1989	Snake Eater	Officer Jack "Soldier" Kelly	
1989	Snake Eater II: The Drug Buster	Officer Jack "Soldier" Kelly	
1991	Night of the Warrior	Miles Keane	also producer
1991	Killing Streets	Charlie Wolff	
1992	Final Impact	Nick Taylor	
1992	The Swordsman	Andrew Garrett	
1992	Snake Eater III: His Law	Jack "Soldier" Kelly	
1992	CIA Code Name: Alexa	CIA Agent Mark Graver	
1993	Bounty Tracker	Johnathan Damone	Direct-to-video
1993	CIA II: Target Alexa	CIA Agent Mark Graver	
1994	Final Round	Tyler Verdiccio	Direct-to-video
1994	Bad Blood	Travis Blackstone	
1995	Midnight Man	John Kang	
1995	Gladiator Cop	Andrew Garrett	Also known as Gladiator Cop: The Swordsman II
1996	Mask of Death	Detective McKenna / Lyle Mason	
1996	Terminal Justice	Sergeant Bobby Chase	
1997	Black Dawn	Jake Kilkanin	
1997	The Rage	Nick Travis	
1998	Undercurrent	Mike Aguayo	
1998	Back to Even	Mitch	
1999	The Muse	Himself	
2002	The Circuit 2: The Final Punch	Max	Direct-to-video
2003	Rapid Exchange	Ketchum	Direct-to-video
2003	13 Dead Men	Santos	
2003	Dark Waters	Dane Quatrell	Direct-to-video
2004	Motocross Kids	Evan Reed	
2004	Latin Dragon	Frank Braun	
2004	Sci-Fighter	Andrew Dean	
2004	Unseen Evil 2	Biggs	Direct-to-video
2005	Lethal	Anatoly Federov	
2005	Thralls	Mr. Jones	
2005	Killing Cupid	Shane	
2005	The Nowhere Man		
2006	18 Fingers of Death!	Antonio Bandana	Direct-to-video
2007	Succubus: Hell-Bent	Flight Instructor	Direct-to-video
2007	30,000 Leagues Under the Sea	Lieutenant Michael Arronax	Direct-to-video
2008	Chinaman's Chance: America's Other Slaves	Father Smith	
2009	Mexican Gold	Cole	
2009	Mega Shark Versus Giant Octopus	Allan Baxter	
2011	Backstabber	Frank Prather	
2012	Return to Vengenance	Brady	
2013	Raptor Ranch	Special Agent Logan	
2013	Cathedral Canyon	Carl Romero	
2013	A Little Christmas Business	Billy Baxter	
2014	Grace of God	Jerold	
2014	Being American	Tom	
2014	Bro, What Happened?	Cheeba	
2014	My Name Is Nobody	Senor Santiago	
2015	WWJD What Would Jesus Do? The Journey Continues	Jack	
2015	American Beach House	Lifeguard Joe	
2015	Atomic Eden	Nathan "The Snake"	
2015	God's Club	Spencer Rivers	
2016	Prayer Never Fails	Judge Rogers	
2016	Beyond the Game	Trainer	
2016	Movie Madness	Detective Avery	
2017	Secrets of Deception	Gregg	
2017	Boone: The Bounty Hunter	Walker	
2017	BorderCross	Danny Jackson	
2018	Railroad to Hell: A Chinaman's Chance	Father Smith	
2018	Driver	Reggie	
2018	Unwritten	General Lane	
2019	Las Vegas Vietnam: The Movie	Zapata Sr., Gang Leader	
2019	Water	Frank Johnson	
2020	Scorpion Girl Awakening: The Movie	FBI Agent	
2020	Real Blood: The True Beginning	Father Diaz	
2020	Bleach	Elmer Paxton	

=== Television ===
Year	Title	Role	Notes
1977	Switch	Various	2 episodes
1978	Sword of Justice	Donno Novanti	Episode: "A Double Life"
1979	Dear Detective		Episode: #1.2
1979	California Fever	Rick	10 episodes
1980	Detour to Terror	Jamie	Television film
1980–1981	Secrets of Midland Heights	Burt Carroll	2 episodes
1980–1986	The Love Boat	Various	5 episodes
1981–1990	Falcon Crest	Lance Cumson	227 episodes Nominated – Golden Globe Award for Best Supporting Actor – Series, Miniseries or Television Film (1983); Nominated – Soap Opera Digest Award: Outstanding Actress/Actor in a Comic Relief Role on a Prime Time Serial; Outstanding Actor in a Supporting Role on a Prime Time Serial (1986)
1983	Fantasy Island	Richard Warrington	Episode: "Naughty Marietta/The Winning Ticket"
1983	Hotel	Diz Wilder	Episode: "The Offer"
1990	The Hitchhiker	Tom Astor	Episode: "Trust Me"
1991	Dear John	Alejandro Braceros	2 episodes
1992	Flesh and the Devil	Gropius	Television film
1992–1997	Renegade	Reno Raines / Vince Black	110 episodes
1998	Invasion America	Cale Oosha	Voice, 9 episodes
1998–1999	Air America	Rio Arnett	26 episodes
2000–2001	The Immortal	Raphael 'Rafe' Cain	22 episodes
2002	Hope Ranch	Colt Webb	Television film
2002-2004	Teamo Supremo	Major Delays	Episode: "State of Chaos!"
2003	Are You Hot?	Judge	6 episodes
2003	The Paradise Virus	Paul Johnson	Television film
2004	Deep Evil	Trainor	Television film
2004	Raptor Island	Hacket	Television film
2004	Reno 911!	Deputy Garcia	Episode: "Department Investigation: Part 2"
2004–2006	The Bold and the Beautiful	Hector Ramirez	191 episodes
2006	Twentyfourseven	Himself	1 episode
2009–2013	Phineas and Ferb	Meap	Voice, 5 episodes
2009	Leave It to Lamas	Himself	8 episodes
2010–2013	Big Time Rush	Dr. Hollywood	4 episodes
2011	NTSF:SD:SUV::	Felipe Calderon	Episode: "Tijuana, We've Got a Problem"
2011	Actors Anonymous	Himself	Television film
2012	Ronn's Garage		2 episodes
2012	The Eric Andre Show	Himself	TV series
2012	Ash Global	Bruce	Episode: "Take Memo Home"
2013	The Joe Schmo Show	Himself	2 episodes
2013	Ghost Ghirls	John	Episode: "Hooker with a Heart of Ghoul"
2013	Bike Cops Van Nuys	'Ponch'	Television film
2014	Workaholics	Rick Messona	Episode: "We Be Clownin'"
2014	American Dad!	Security Guard	Voice, episode: "Big Stan on Campus"
2015	Sharknado 3: Oh Hell No!	Sergeant Rock	Television film
2016–2017	Lucha Underground	Councilman Delgado	6 episodes
2016	Bail Out	Himself	2 episodes
2019	Jane the Virgin	Himself	Episode: "Chapter Eighty-Five"

== Discography ==
Year	Title	Country	Notes
1984	You Better Hang On	Portugal	
1984	Fools Like Me	United States	
1984	Fingerprints	West Germany	Album
1984	Smooth Talker	United States	Maxi-single
