= Magic Fountain (film) =

Spanish film

Magic Fountain is a 1963 Spanish film starring Fernando Lamas who also directed. It co stars his then wife Esther Williams. It was Williams' last movie and was never released in the US.

The film was shot in 1961 at Madrid Studios and in the province of Andalusia in Southern Spain.
