= The Merry Widow (1952 film) =

1952 film by Curtis Bernhardt

- Directed by: Curtis Bernhardt
- Written by: Victor Léon (libretto); Leo Stein (libretto); Sonya Levien; William Ludwig
- Based on: Die lustige Witwe; 1905 operetta by Franz Lehár
- Produced by: Joe Pasternak
- Starring: Lana Turner; Fernando Lamas
- Cinematography: Robert Surtees
- Edited by: Conrad A. Nervig
- Music by: Jay Blackton (uncredited)
- Color process: Technicolor
- Production company: Metro-Goldwyn-Mayer
- Distributed by: Loew's Inc.
- Release date: September 24, 1952 (New York)
- Running time: 105 minutes
- Country: United States
- Language: English
- Budget: $2,417,000
- Box office: $4,500,000

The Merry Widow is a 1952 American film directed by Curtis Bernhardt and starring Lana Turner and Fernando Lamas. It is the third MGM screen adaptation of the 1905 operetta of the same title by Franz Lehár, following versions from 1925 and 1934.

== Plot ==
In 1899, the king of Marshovia, a small European country with financial difficulty, invites young, rich widow Crystal Radek to his country for the unveiling of a statue in honor of her dead husband Charlie, a Marshovian native. The king's true motive is to access her wealth for the nation's coffers, and he assigns Count Danilo to woo her. Crystal arrives with her secretary Kitty Riley and reports to the palace.

The king directs the count to sing as Crystal stands in the balcony window of her bedroom, and she is impressed. Crystal discovers she was invited because of her wealth, and begins packing for her return to America. However, she remains attracted to Danilo. However, the count thinks that Kitty is Crystal, and they maintain the ruse. Crystal attends a party where she meets Danilo, who is immediately attracted to her. Crystal says that her name is Fifi and feigns ignorance of his identity. However, she angrily chides Danilo for his lecherous manner before returning to apologize, and they profess their love for each other. Crystal leaves without Danilo knowing where Fifi lives. As Danilo searches for Fifi, Crystal wants to be sure that Danilo loves her for herself and not for her wealth. Danilo finds her, but because of his orders from the king to woo the widow, he refuses to commit himself to Fifi. Crystal reveals her true identity to the count, but because of their mutual deception, they separate. The king is furious, but Crystal pays the nation's debt and intends to leave. No longer forced to woo Crystal, Danilo still professes his love for her and they reunite.

== Cast ==
- Lana Turner as Crystal Radek
- Fernando Lamas as Count Danilo
- Una Merkel as Kitty Riley
- Richard Haydn as Baron Popoff
- Thomas Gomez as King of Marshovia
- John Abbott as Marshovian Ambassador
- Marcel Dalio as the police sergeant
- King Donovan as Nitki
- Robert Coote as Marquis de Crillon
- Lisa Ferraday as Marcella
- Joi Lansing as a Maxim's girl (uncredited)
- Lisa Golm as Queen (uncredited)
- Gwen Verdon and Matt Mattox perform dances choreographed by Jack Cole

== Production ==
Lana Turner was announced as the female lead and Curtis Bernhardt as the director in June 1951. Turner's singing voice was dubbed by Trudy Erwin.

Una Merkel, who portrays Kitty Riley, had played Queen Dolores in the 1934 version.

Bernhardt used incandescent lighting in an effort to keep the action "bubbly and light", as traditional arc lighting was believed to impede the movement of the camera.

== Reception ==
In a contemporary review for The New York Times, critic Bosley Crowther praised the production and the performances of the cast, writing that "the brilliance in Technicolor of the palaces, grand hotels and a replica of Maxim's in Paris that the craftsmen at Metro have contrived is something—we say this in wonder—to take your breath away, and the richness of the costumes and the staging of dance and choral groups will deal the knockout blow."

According to MGM records, the film earned $2,232,000 in the U.S. and Canada and $2,268,000 elsewhere, resulting in a profit of $27,000.

== Awards ==
The film received Academy Award nominations for Best Art Direction, Color and Best Costume Design, Color.
