= Leave It to Lamas =

- Genre: Reality
- Starring: Lorenzo Lamas; Shayne Lamas
- Composer: Adam Malka
- Country of origin: United States
- Original language: English
- No. of seasons: 1
- No. of episodes: 8

Production
- Executive producers: Jason Ehrlich; Mike Fleiss; Martin Hilton; Alycia Rossiter
- Cinematography: German Abarca, Jr.
- Editors: Neal Acosta; Jason Wood
- Running time: 22–24 minutes
- Production company: Warner Horizon Television

Original release
- Network: E!
- Release: October 11 – November 29, 2009

Leave It to Lamas is an American reality series broadcast on the E! cable television network that aired in 2009 starring Lorenzo Lamas and his family.

== Synopsis ==
The show documents the lives of Lorenzo Lamas, his ex-wife Michele Smith, their two children, Shayne and AJ Lamas, and Michele's daughter with ex-husband Craig Pike, Dakota. The show portrays the family's careers, dating, and personal lives.

== Cast ==
- Lorenzo Lamas – The star of Falcon Crest and Renegade is the father of A.J. and Shayne Lamas, and ex-husband of Michele Smith. The show follows him as he starts dating, but primarily deals with his interaction with daughter Shayne.
- Shayne Lamas – Shayne is a 25-year-old model and actress. She is looking to move forward in her acting and modeling career with advice from her father and her siblings on the reality show. Shayne is currently single and "looking for love."
- AJ Lamas – AJ is a 27-year-old actor. AJ and Lorenzo have a poor relationship due to Lorenzo's belief that AJ and Lorenzo's fourth ex-wife, Shauna Sand, had engaged in a sexual relationship. Though AJ denies this, he and Lorenzo still engage in a public family feud.
- Michele Smith – A former publicist with PMK-N.Y., is the #2 ex-wife of Lorenzo Lamas. She is the mother of AJ, and Shayne (both fathered by Lorenzo) and Dakota Pike (fathered by ex-husband Craig Pike). Michele is extremely funny, and is generally seen as a sweet empty nester.
- Dakota Pike – Dakota is the 17-year-old half-sister/roommate of AJ and Shayne. She is an occasional actress and aspiring singer recording her debut album.
- dogs Madison and Riley – Madison is Shayne's 2 year old Westie Bichon. Riley (aka Little Man) is Michele's 3-year-old tea cup Maltese.

== Episodes ==
No.	Title	Original release date
1	"Where There's Smoke…"	October 11, 2009
2	"The Mating Game"	October 18, 2009
3	"The Ugly Duckling"	October 25, 2009
4	"Babes in Bikerland"	November 1, 2009
5	"Dollars and Sense"	November 8, 2009
6	"Reality Check"	November 15, 2009
7	"Shayne Takes Manhattan"	November 22, 2009
8	"It's My Party..."	November 29, 2009
