= Nik Richie =

American blogger

- Born: Hooman Abedi Karamian; February 12, 1979 (age 47); Hackensack, New Jersey, U.S.
- Other names: Corbin Grimes; Nik Lamas-Richie
- Occupation: Internet personality
- Years active: 2007–2018
- Known for: Gossip website TheDirty.com; reality TV appearances
- Spouses: Amanda Toney (m. 2005; div. 2009) Shayne Lamas (m. 2010; div. 2021)
- Children: 2

Nik Lamas-Richie (born Hooman Abedi Karamian; February 12, 1979) is an American Internet personality most prominent in the late 2000s and 2010s. Richie is best known as the founder of controversial gossip website TheDirty.com.

== Early life ==
Richie was born in Hackensack, New Jersey as Hooman Abedi Karamian to Armenian parents from Iran. Prior to his Internet career, he worked as a credit card processor.

== Career ==
Richie founded the gossip website TheDirty.com in March 2007 as DirtyScottsdale.com while living in Scottsdale, Arizona and started using the pseudonym Nik Richie, as he preferred to stay anonymous. The content on Dirtyscottsdale.com initially focused on derision of Scottsdale's club scene.

Ben Quayle wrote for DirtyScottsdale.com

Co-founded by Ari Golden, the later and more widely known version, TheDirty.com, allows users to anonymously upload their own "dirt" including news, gossip, accusations, photos, videos, or text, and comment on posts submitted by others.

Richie operated TheDirty.com anonymously until September 4, 2008, when he was arrested for DUI and reckless driving in Scottsdale. Once news of his arrest surfaced, Richie publicly admitted his real identity.

In a March 2019 Instagram post, Richie stated he was no longer associated with TheDirty.com, having 'retired' from the site in April 2018.

== TheDirty.com ==
=== Lawsuits ===
"A lawyer for Dirty World LLC, David Gingras, says he represents Dirty World LLC, which operates Thedirty.com. ... He says the company named, Dirty World Entertainment Recordings, does not own or have a relationship with the website."

In May 2010, Richie's website TheDirty published web posts:

"to retaliate against Kristen Creighton of La Porte, Texas, who won a $1.5 million judgment in October against Richie and his company, Dirty World."

In 2011, Memphis, Tennessee, TV reporter Lauren Lee's lawsuit demanded that posts be permanently removed and $50 million.

In a heavily publicized case, Sarah Jones v. Dirty World Entertainment Recordings, LLC, a federal court in Kentucky initially found that Richie was not entitled to CDA immunity in a case arising from several posts about Kentucky high school teacher and part-time cheerleader Sarah Jones. The jury awarded Jones $338,000 in compensatory and punitive damages. However, Richie filed a successful appeal before the United States Court of Appeals for the Sixth Circuit, which in June 2014 ordered the judgment vacated and dismissed.

Richie has been the defendant in several lawsuits relating to material posted on TheDirty.com. Richie has argued that he is protected from liability by Section 230 of the Communications Decency Act, like other operators of blogs and websites that allow third party users to submit content.

=== Donald Trump ===
In 2011, thedirty.com published an uncorroborated article claiming Stormy Daniels and Donald Trump had a sexual encounter at a golfing event, and Life & Style Weekly, a supermarket tabloid, printed the story. Stormy Daniels interviewed with Bauer Publishing, the parent company of Life & Style Weekly and In Touch Weekly magazines.

== Media appearances ==
In November 2010, Nik Richie, with his wife, Shayne Lamas, appeared on an episode of Dr. Phil devoted to the subject of online bullying and gossip entitled "Dirt, Lies and the Internet.". Phil McGraw questioned Richie about the morality of a website which allows users to openly bash each other with hurtful and profane comments, to which Richie responded that there is a marketplace for such a website. McGraw replied, "Well, there's a marketplace for heroin too, but that doesn't justify being a heroin addict."

In November 2011, Richie was interviewed by talk show host Anderson Cooper in an episode during which he was confronted by Sarah Jones, the former Cincinnati Bengals cheerleader and high school teacher who, at the time, was suing Richie for defamation. Richie was featured in a second interview with Anderson Cooper which aired in January 2012.

In June 2011, ABC News program 20/20 aired a segment about Richie and his legal battle with Sarah Jones.

In late 2012, Richie and his then-wife Shayne Lamas appeared on Season 2 of VH1 reality show Couples Therapy along with several other couples. In the season's final episode, Richie and Lamas renewed their wedding vows in a televised ceremony. Richie and Lamas appeared together in a Couples Therapy reunion episode which aired in 2014.

In May 2013, Richie released a memoir, Sex, Lies and The Dirty.

== Personal life ==
Richie's first marriage, to Amanda Toney, took place in 2005 and ended in 2009.

Richie's second marriage was to actress and reality TV personality Shayne Lamas. The pair met during a vacation to Las Vegas and were married on April 18, 2010 at the Little White Wedding Chapel eight hours after they first met. They had two children: daughter Press, born November 11, 2011, and son Lyon, born via surrogate on July 4, 2015. They divorced in 2021.

Richie was diagnosed with multiple sclerosis in 2015.

== Bibliography ==
- 2013 - Sex, Lies and The Dirty ISBN 978-1936239597

== See also ==
- Stormy Daniels–Donald Trump scandal
- Prosecution of Donald Trump in New York
- Reactions to the prosecution of Donald Trump in New York
- Personal and business legal affairs of Donald Trump
- New York investigations of the Trump Organization
- Donald Trump 2024 presidential campaign
- Donald Trump 2016 presidential campaign
