= Rachel Gunn, R.N. =

American sitcom

- Genre: Sitcom
- Created by: Katherine Green
- Starring: Christine Ebersole; Kevin Conroy; Megan Mullally; Bryan Brightcloud; Lois Foraker; Dan Tullis Jr. Kathleen Marshall
- Opening theme: "Workin' for a Livin'" performed by Christine Ebersole
- Composer: Kurt Farquhar
- Country of origin: United States
- Original language: English
- No. of seasons: 1
- No. of episodes: 13 (3 unaired)

Production
- Running time: 30 minutes
- Production companies: ELP Communications; A Foul Tempered Woman Productions; Columbia Pictures Television

Original release
- Network: Fox
- Release: June 28 – September 4, 1992

Rachel Gunn, R.N. is an American sitcom that aired on Fox from June 28, 1992, to September 4, 1992.

== Premise ==
The series followed the staff of Little Innocence Hospital in Nebraska. Those shown included head nurse Rachel Gunn, surgeon David Dunkle, and Native American Vietnam War veteran Zac.

The opening theme was a cover of the Huey Lewis and the News song "Workin' for a Livin'" sung by Ebersole.

== History ==
The show was originally developed for CBS with country music singer K.T. Oslin to star in the title role. But in May 1991, it was reported that Oslin had pulled out because she thought the main character was too mean.

After Ebersole came on board in the lead role, CBS ordered six episodes but concluded the show's brash style was not a good fit and seemed more like a show Fox would air. The show was later picked up by Fox. On June 10, 1992, Fox announced that the show would debut on Sunday June 28, in the 8:30 pm Eastern Time slot, a summer time replacement for Roc. At first it was announced that six episodes would air, though 13 had been ordered. After seven episodes aired, the show was moved to 9:30 Eastern on Fridays, for three weeks.

The creator and executor producer of the show was Katherine Green, also a producer on Married... with Children. As a University of Oklahoma graduate, she made sure that branded materials from that school and also Oklahoma State University appeared on the set of the show.

Though Ebersole got credit for her performance, the show received generally negative reviews. In one of the more salacious reviews, People opined that "Fox is scraping the bottom of the bedpan with this summer sitcom," which it deemed an "ugly insultfest" and the "idiot cousin" of NBC show Nurses. The series was not a ratings hit and was canceled less than three months of its initial airing.

== Cast ==
- Christine Ebersole as Rachel Gunn
- Kevin Conroy as Dr. David Dunkle
- Megan Mullally as Becky Jo
- Bryan Brightcloud as Zac
- Lois Foraker as Jeanette
- Dan Tullis Jr. as Dane Grey
- Kathleen Mitchell as Sister Joan

== Episodes ==
No.	Title	Directed by	Written by	Original release date	U.S. viewers (millions)
1	"The House of Rachel"	John Whitesell	Katherine Green	June 28, 1992	11.4
2	"Walkin' the Floor Over You"	John Whitesell	Kim Weiskopf	July 5, 1992	9.1
3	"To Plea or Not to Plea"	John Whitesell	Katherine Green	July 12, 1992	9.1
4	"A Fistful of Savings"	John Whitesell	Ellen L. Fogle	July 19, 1992	9.2
5	"The Pet Peeve"	John Whitesell	Jack Bernstein	July 26, 1992	8.2
6	"A Kept Woman"	John Whitesell	Russell Marcus	August 2, 1992	8.6
7	"Jeanette Meets Strasberg"	Art Dielhenn	Kim Weiskopf	August 9, 1992	8.2
8	"My Left Feet"	Art Dielhenn	Daphne Pollon & David Castro	August 14, 1992	5.6
9	"Who's That Knockin' on My Head?"	Art Dielhenn	Michele J. Wolff	August 21, 1992	6.3
10	"Love is Here to Stray"	Art Dielhenn	Katherine Green	September 4, 1992	5.7
11	"Rachel Sees Red"	Art Dielhenn	Katherine Green	N/A	TBD
12	"I Dream of Squidhead"	Art Dielhenn	Michael Riedel	N/A	TBD
13	"Come Ona My House"	Art Dielhenn	Tom Whedon	N/A	TBD
