= Fernando Lamas =

Argentine-American actor (1915–1982)

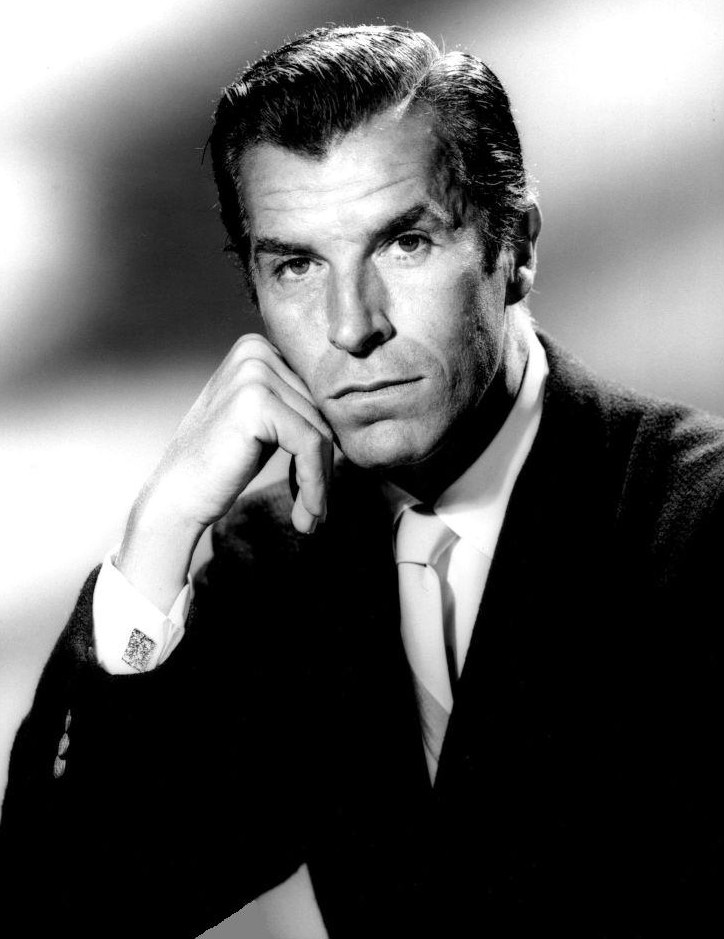
- Lamas in the 1960s
- Born: Fernando Álvaro Lamas y de Santos; January 9, 1915; Buenos Aires, Argentina
- Died: October 8, 1982 (aged 67); Los Angeles, California, U.S.
- Occupations: Actor; director
- Years active: 1942–1982
- Spouses: Perla Mux (m. 1940; div. 1944) Lydia Babacci (m. 1946; div. 1952) Arlene Dahl (m. 1954; div. 1960) Esther Williams (m. 1969)
- Children: 3, including Lorenzo Lamas
- Relatives: AJ Lamas (grandson); Shayne Lamas (granddaughter)

Fernando Álvaro Lamas y de Santos (January 9, 1915 – October 8, 1982) was an Argentine-American actor and director of the Golden Age of Argentine cinema. He is the father of actor Lorenzo Lamas.

== Biography ==
=== Argentina ===
Fernando Álvaro Lamas y de Santos was born in Buenos Aires, Argentina.

In this country, his movies included En el último piso (1942), Frontera Sur (1943), Villa rica del Espíritu Santo (1945), and Stella (1946). Lamas was also seen in The Poor People's Christmas (1947), The Tango Returns to Paris (1948), and The Story of a Bad Woman (1948). He had the lead in La rubia Mireya (1949) alongside Mecha Ortiz, and a key role in De padre desconocido (1949), Vidalita (1949) and The Story of the Tango (1950). He also appeared in Corrientes, calle de ensueños (1949), and La otra y yo (1950). He was reportedly the third biggest star in the country. His first American film was The Avengers (1950) for Republic Pictures, shot on location in Argentina. Some scenes were filmed in the US, leading to Lamas going to Hollywood.

=== MGM ===
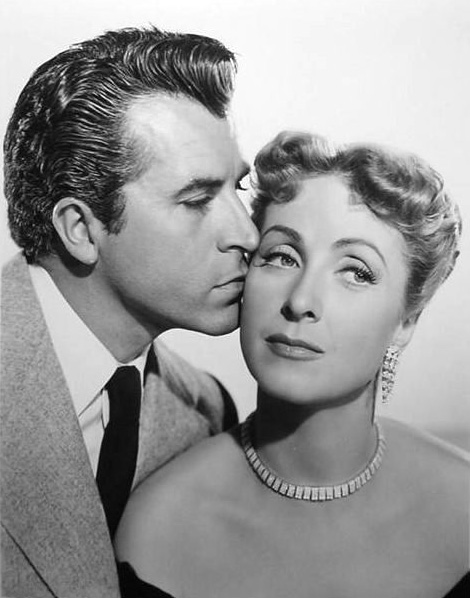
Lamas with co-star Danielle Darrieux in Rich, Young and Pretty

In September 1949, he signed a contract with Metro-Goldwyn-Mayer (MGM) and went on to play mainly "Latin lover" roles and occasionally sing in musicals. In 1951, Lamas starred as Paul Sarnac in the musical, Rich, Young and Pretty with Jane Powell. He supported Greer Garson and Michael Wilding in The Law and the Lady (1952), which was a flop.

MGM gave him a star tenor part as Lana Turner's love interest in the popular operetta The Merry Widow (1952) by Franz Lehár. He romanced Elizabeth Taylor in The Girl Who Had Everything (1952), which was also successful. Lamas went to Paramount Pictures, where he was top-billed in Sangaree (1953). Back at MGM, he was Esther Williams' leading man in Dangerous When Wet (1953), a big success. At Warner Bros. Lamas starred in The Diamond Queen (1954). He did Jivaro (1954) at Paramount then returned to MGM for a remake of Rose Marie (1954) supporting Howard Keel and Ann Blyth. It was popular, but failed to recoup its cost. At Paramount, he was Rosalind Russell's leading man in The Girl Rush (1955). Lamas started appearing on television, including an adaptation of Hold Back the Dawn for Lux Video Theatre.

"I couldn't break the Latin lover image", Lamas later claimed. He co-starred on Broadway in the 1956 musical Happy Hunting with Ethel Merman, for which he was nominated for a Tony Award.

=== Television ===
Lamas did episodes of Jane Wyman Presents The Fireside Theatre ("The Bravado Touch"), Climax! ("Spider Web"), Pursuit ("Eagle in a Cage"), Shirley Temple's Storybook, and Zane Grey Theatre, but returned to features with The Lost World (1960). He also guest starred in one episode of The Lucy Desi Comedy Hour Lamas also appeared in the TV show "Combat!" (season five, episode four) "Brothers."

=== Europe ===
Lamas moved to Europe with Esther Williams, who became his wife. He directed a film in which both starred, Magic Fountain, shot in 1961 and never released in the US. He went to Italy for Duel of Fire (1962), and Revenge of the Musketeers (1963). He helped write the Western A Place Called Glory (1965).

=== Return to the U.S. ===
Lamas returned to Hollywood. As an actor, he focused on television, with guest appearances on Burke's Law, The Virginian, Laredo, Combat!, The Red Skelton Hour, Hondo, and The Girl from U.N.C.L.E.. From 1965 to 1968, Lamas had a regular role as Ramon De Vega on Run for Your Life, which starred Ben Gazzara; Lamas also directed some episodes.

He had a support role in Valley of Mystery (1967), a pilot for a series that did not proceed. He directed another feature film, The Violent Ones, which was released in 1967 and co-starred Aldo Ray and David Carradine. He was in Kill a Dragon (1967) and 100 Rifles (1969), and had guest roles on The High Chaparral, How the West Was Won, Tarzan, Then Came Bronson, It Takes a Thief, Mission: Impossible, The Name of the Game, Dan August, Alias Smith and Jones, Bearcats!, Mod Squad, Night Gallery, and McCloud.

=== TV director ===
Lamas started directing TV, as well: The Bold Ones: The Lawyers, Mannix, Alias Smith and Jones, S.W.A.T., The Rookies, Jigsaw John, Starsky and Hutch, The Hardy Boys/Nancy Drew Mysteries, The Amazing Spider-Man, Secrets of Midland Heights, Flamingo Road, and Code Red. As an actor, he was in the TV movies The Lonely Profession (1969) and Murder on Flight 502 (1975). He also was seen in Bronk, Switch (which he also directed), Won Ton Ton: The Dog Who Saved Hollywood (1976), Quincy, M.E., Charlie's Angels, Police Woman, The Love Boat, The Cheap Detective, How the West Was Won, The Dream Merchants, and House Calls.

=== Last years and death ===
Lamas produced the TV movie Samurai, released in 1979. He directed episodes of Falcon Crest co-starring his son, Lorenzo. He also helmed Bret Maverick and several episodes of House Calls.

He had a supporting role in the series Gavilan, when he fell ill with cancer. His scenes were shot with Patrick Macnee.

Fernando Lamas died of pancreatic cancer in Los Angeles in 1982, aged 67. His ashes were scattered by close friend Jonathan Goldsmith from his sailboat.

== Personal life ==
Lamas was married four times. His first marriage was to Argentine actress Perla Mux in 1940, and they had a daughter, Christina, before divorcing in 1944. His second marriage was in 1946 to Lydia Valeria Babacci; this marriage also produced a daughter, Alejandra Lydia. They were divorced in 1952. His third wife was the American actress Arlene Dahl. They were married in 1954. They were later divorced in 1960. Out of this marriage was born Lorenzo Lamas (born January 20, 1958). His longest marriage was to swimmer and actress Esther Williams in 1969, and they remained married until Lamas's death in 1982.

== In popular culture ==
His friend, actor Jonathan Goldsmith, took inspiration from Lamas for the character the Most Interesting Man in the World. The most well-known parody of Fernando was on the Saturday Night Live sketches that featured Billy Crystal. In the recurring Fernando's Hideaway sketch, Crystal used Lamas's accent for inspiration, as well as a quote from the actor: "It is better to look good than to feel good."

== Filmography ==
=== Film ===
- 1943 On the Last Floor
- 1943 Stella
- 1943 Southern Border
- 1945 Villa rica del Espíritu Santo
- 1947 The Poor People's Christmas
- 1947 Evasion as Bruno
- 1948 The Tango Returns to Paris
- 1948 Story of a Bad Woman
- 1948 La Rubia Mireya as Alberto
- 1949 The Unknown Father
- 1949 Vidalita
- 1949 The Story of the Tango as Juan Carlos Maldonado
- 1949 Corrientes, calle de ensueños
- 1949 La Otra y yo
- 1950 The Avengers as André LeBlanc
- 1951 Rich, Young and Pretty as Paul Sarnac
- 1951 The Law and the Lady as Juan Dinas
- 1952 The Merry Widow as Count Danilo
- 1953 The Girl Who Had Everything as Victor Y. Raimondi
- 1953 Sangaree as Dr. Carlos Morales
- 1953 Dangerous When Wet as Andre LaNet
- 1953 The Diamond Queen as Jean Baptiste Tavernier
- 1954 Jivaro as Rio Galdez
- 1954 Rose Marie as James Severn Duval
- 1955 The Girl Rush as Victor Monte
- 1960 The Lost World as Manuel Gomez
- 1962 Duel of Fire as Antonio Franco
- 1963 Revenge of the Musketeers as D'Artagnan
- 1963 Magic Fountain as Alberto
- 1965 A Place Called Glory
- 1967 The Violent Ones as Manuel Vega
- 1967 Kill a Dragon as Nico Patrai
- 1969 100 Rifles as General Verdugo
- 1976 Won Ton Ton, the Dog Who Saved Hollywood as Premiere Male Star
- 1978 The Cheap Detective as Paul DuChard

=== Television ===
- 1954 Lux Video Theatre
- 1958 The Lucy–Desi Comedy Hour ("S1E5: Lucy Goes to Sun Valley")
- 1958 The Jane Wyman Show as Juan Bravado
- 1958 Climax! as Jose Aragon
- 1960 Dick Powell's Zane Grey Theatre as Giulio Mandati / Miguel
- 1960 Shirley Temple's Storybook as Professor Fritz Bhaer
- 1965 Burke's Law as Kelly Mars / El Greco
- 1965 The Virginian as Captain Estrada
- 1965 Combat! ("Breakout") as Vertrain
- 1966 Laredo as Paco Romero
- 1966 Combat! ("The Brothers") as Leon Paulon
- 1966 The Girl from U.N.C.L.E. as Salim Ibn Hydari / Alejandro De Sada
- 1967 Valley of Mystery as Francisco Rivera
- 1965-1968 Run for Your Life as Ramon De Vega
- 1971 The Red Skelton Show ("A Spy Is a Peeping Tom on Salary") as Harry Sneak
- 1967 Hondo ("Hondo and the Comancheros") as Rodrigo
- 1967 The High Chaparral ("The Firing Wall") as "El Caudillo"
- 1968 Tarzan ("Jungle Ransom") as Velasquez
- 1968-1970 It Takes a Thief as Paolo Monteggo / Pepe Rouchet / Francisco Arascan
- 1968-1970 Mission Impossible as Ramon Prado / Roger Toland
- 1969 Then Came Bronson ("Where Will the Trumpets Be?") as Miguel Cordova
- 1969 The Lonely Profession as Dominic Savarona
- 1970 The Name of the Game as Cesar Rodriguez
- 1971 Dan August as Tony Storm
- 1971 Alias Smith and Jones as Jim "Big Jim" Santana
- 1971 Bearcats! as Chucho Morales (Pilot Movie, "Powderkeg")
- 1971-1973 The Mod Squad as Arturo Roca / Lieutenant Ramon Sanchez
- 1973 Night Gallery as Dr. Ramirez (segment "Hatred Unto Death")
- 1974 Sesame Street as himself (guest appearance)
- 1975 McCloud as Max Cortez
- 1975 Murder on Flight 502 as Paul Barons
- 1975 Bronk as Abriega
- 1976 Switch as Fouad
- 1977 Charlie's Angels as Jericho
- 1977 Police Woman as Carlos Rubenez
- 1978 The Love Boat as Bill Klieg / Bill Teague
- 1979 How the West Was Won as Fierro
- 1980 House Calls ("Defeat of Clay") as Dr. Langston
- 1980 The Dream Merchants as Conrad Stillman (final appearance)

== Radio appearances ==
Year	Program	Episode/source
1952	Lux Radio Theatre	Strictly Dishonorable
