= The American Hobo =

2003 film

- Directed by: Bobb Hopkins
- Written by: Bobb Hopkins
- Release date: 2003
- Running time: 87 minutes
- Country: United States
- Language: English

The American Hobo is a 2003 documentary film by writer and director Bobb Hopkins.

== Content ==
The documentary examines the history and culture of American hobos. The documentary is narrated by Academy Award-winning actor Ernest Borgnine. It features interviews with Pulitzer Prize-winning author James Michener and musician Merle Haggard.

The film received an honorable mention at the 2003 George Lindsey/UNA Film Festival.
