= AJ Lamas =

American actor (born 1983)

- Born: Alvaro Joshua Lamas; December 19, 1983 (age 42); Los Angeles County, California, U.S.
- Occupation: Actor
- Years active: 2001–2016
- Parent: Lorenzo Lamas (father)
- Relatives: Shayne Lamas (sister); Fernando Lamas (grandfather); Arlene Dahl (grandmother)

Alvaro Joshua Lamas (born December 19, 1983) is an American former actor.

== Career ==
Lamas is best known for his role as Rafael Ortega on As the World Turns, Simon McCrae on Gigantic, and as Cisco Gonzalez on American Family. He also appeared with his family on the E! reality show Leave It to Lamas.

In 2001, Lamas was awarded Model of the Year and Young Adult Actor of the Year from the International Model & Talent Association. In 2003, he was Mr. Golden Globe alongside Dominik Garcia-Lorido, daughter of Andy García, at the 60th Golden Globe Awards.

== Personal life ==
He is the son of Michele Smith and actor Lorenzo Lamas and brother to model and actress Shayne Lamas, and grandson to Fernando Lamas and Arlene Dahl.

=== Legal issues ===
In 2012, Lamas was accused of breaking into his ex-girlfriend's home (Jessie Schulman) and holding her captive in the bathroom. Schulman filed a restraining order, claiming she broke up with A.J. and moved on to a new relationship. Lamas denied the incident saying he was only trying to talk to Schulman.

Also in 2012, Lamas was arrested for DUI; he pleaded guilty and was sentenced to 36 months probation and $1,600 in fines.

In 2015, Lamas was arrested after allegedly shoplifting at Target and assaulting a security guard.

== Filmography ==
=== Film ===
Year	Title	Role	Notes
2006	Séance	Diego	
2010	A Gangland Love Story	Romano	
2012	Attack of the 50 Foot Cheerleader	Brandon	
2016	DaZe: Vol. Too (sic) - NonSeNse	Rich	

=== Television ===
Year	Title	Role	Notes
2002	American Family	Cisco Gonzalez	12 episodes
2004–2005	As the World Turns	Rafael Ortega	8 episodes
2009	Leave It to Lamas	Himself	4 episodes
2010–2011	Gigantic	Simon McCrae	6 episodes
