= CIA II: Target Alexa =

- Directed by: Lorenzo Lamas
- Written by: Michael January; Kathleen Kinmont
- Produced by: PM Entertainment Group
- Starring: Lorenzo Lamas; Kathleen Kinmont; John Savage
- Release date: December 6, 1993
- Running time: 90 minutes
- Country: United States
- Language: English

CIA II: Target Alexa is a 1993 action film, directed by and starring Lorenzo Lamas and his then wife Kathleen Kinmont. It is a sequel to CIA Code Name: Alexa (1992).

== Plot ==
When Alexa (Kathleen Kinmont) was captured, Mark Graver (Lorenzo Lamas), the best CIA agent, tried to turn her against her latest employer who had diplomatic immunity. Graver used Alexa to find a stolen microchip. Alexa is unable to turn on her own, so Graver must find the key to unlock her conviction.

== Cast ==
- Lorenzo Lamas as CIA Agent Mark Graver
- Kathleen Kinmont as Alexa
- John Savage as Franz Kluge
- John Saint Ryan as Ralph Straker (Credited as John Ryan)
- Lori Fetrick as Lana
- Pamela Dixon as CIA Chief Robin
- Al Sapienza as Raines (Credited as Alex Statler)
- Sandee Van Dyke as Tanya
- Michael Chong as Colonel Trang
- Daryl Keith Roach as Wilson (Credited as Daryl Roach)
- Gary Wood as Rick
- Larry Manetti as Radcliffe
- Branscombe Richmond as General Mendoza
- Mitchell Sacharoff as Robertson
- Anthony De Longis as Gate Mercenary (Credited as Anthony DeLongis)
- Steven Novak as Macho Mercenary
- Jay Lasoff as Mercenary (uncredited)
