= SelectQuote =

Online marketplace for health insurance

SelectQuote Inc
- Company type: Public
- Traded as: NYSE: SLQT; Russell 2000 component
- Industry: Insurance
- Founded: 1985; 41 years ago
- Founder: Charan Singh
- Headquarters: Overland Park, Kansas
- Key people: Donald Hawks (Chairman); Tim Danker (CEO); William (Bill) Grant III (COO); Ryan Clement (CFO); Bob Grant (President)
- Revenue: ▲US$764.0 million (2022)
- Number of employees: 4,292 (2023)
- Website: www.selectquote.com

SelectQuote is a direct-to-consumer distribution platform for selling insurance policies and healthcare services. Their insurance business earns commissions by connecting consumers with insurance carriers that provide senior health, life, automobile, and home insurance. The healthcare services business mainly consists of SelectRx, an accredited pharmacy. The company went public on May 21, 2020.

== History ==
SelectQuote was founded in 1985. In May 2021, the company announced its foray into healthcare services via a new company named Population Health. The company aimed to capture the approximately $125bn in unnecessary healthcare costs by helping prevent the approximately 1.5mm preventable medication-related adverse effects.

In 2025, the United States Department of Justice filed a lawsuit alleging that SelectQuote, along with other insurance brokers and insurance companies, participated in a kick-back scheme that violated the False Claims Act and potentially defrauded Medicare.
