= Air America (TV series) =

- Genre: Action/Adventure
- Created by: Philip DeGuere, Jr.
- Starring: Lorenzo Lamas; Scott Plank; Diana Barton
- Composer: Matt Peters
- Country of origin: United States
- Original language: English
- No. of seasons: 1
- No. of episodes: 26 (4 unaired)

Production
- Executive producers: Herb Nanas; Jeff Franklin; Steve Waterman
- Running time: 60 minutes
- Production companies: Franklin/Waterman Worldwide; Santa Ventura Studios

Original release
- Network: Syndication
- Release: October 3, 1998 – May 22, 1999

Air America is an American action/adventure television series starring Lorenzo Lamas, which premiered on October 3, 1998. The series is not based on the 1990 film Air America. A hangar just west of the Camarillo Airport Tower in Camarillo, California, was used as a set during filming, although it has since been replaced with newer buildings.

== Plot ==
The series concerns two undercover secret agents, Rio and Wiley, who assume a new role for the State Department as pilots who work for the Latin America airline Air America. They receive direct orders from the State Department to do various missions such as protecting witnesses, investigating international crime, and rescuing those in need.

== Cast ==
Actor	Role
Scott Plank	Wiley Ferrell
Lorenzo Lamas	Rio Arnett
Diana Barton	Alison Straton
Gilbert Montoya	Pablo
Karmin Murcelo	Alma
Philip McNulty	Tim
Arthur Roberts	Jenner
Shauna Sand Lamas	Dominique
Charles Martinet	David Dixon

== Episodes ==
No.	Title	Directed by	Written by	Original release date
1	"Lost City"	David Worth	Tom Lazarus	October 3, 1998
2	"Hostage City"	Dimitri Logothetis	Rico Gagliano & Jim McGrath	October 10, 1998
3	"Crosshairs"	David Worth	Jim McGrath	October 17, 1998
4	"Abduction"	David Worth	Alan Levy	October 24, 1998
5	"Seller's Market"	Rex Piano	Alan Levy	October 31, 1998
6	"Rebound"	David Worth	Art Washington	November 7, 1998
7	"The Hit"	David Worth	Stephen McPherson	November 14, 1998
8	"High Noon in Costa Perdida"	Rex Piano	Jim McGrath	November 21, 1998
9	"Till Death"	Rex Piano	Rico Gagliano	November 28, 1998
10	"Fever"	David Worth	Philip DeGuere, Jr.	December 5, 1998
11	"The Witness"	Dimitri Logothetis	J. Rickley Dumm	January 16, 1999
12	"Old Gold"	Gil Bettman	Story by : Ed Gold; Teleplay by : Art Washington	January 23, 1999
13	"Fear of Flying"	David Worth	Jim McGrath	January 30, 1999
14	"Engraved Danger"	Rex Piano	Doug McIntyre	February 6, 1999
15	"Catch-23"	Dimitri Logothetis	Jim McGrath	February 13, 1999
16	"Eye of the Storm"	Dimitri Logothetis	Jim McGrath	February 20, 1999
17	"The Court Martial of Rio Arnett"	David Worth	Jim McGrath	February 27, 1999
18	"The Rescue"	Dimitri Logothetis	Philip DeGuere, Jr.	March 27, 1999
19	"Blown Away"	David Worth	Richard C. Okie	May 1, 1999
20	"Heartbreak Hotel"	Dimitri Logothetis	Jeremy Fine Bollinger	May 8, 1999
21	"Red Sub"	Dimitri Logothetis	Craig Volk	May 15, 1999
22	"American Gulag"	Rex Piano	Jeremy Fine Bollinger	May 22, 1999
23	"Betrayal"	Dimitri Logothetis	Philip DeGuere, Jr.	Unaired
24	"Safe Passage"	Dimitri Logothetis	Art Washington	Unaired
25	"The Cure"	Wayne Ewing	Jeremy Fine Bollinger	Unaired
26	"The Miracle"	Dimitri Logothetis	Stephen McPherson	Unaired

== Home media ==
On June 6, 2006, Sony Pictures Home Entertainment released Air America: The Complete Series on DVD in Region 1.
