= Shauna Sand =

American actress and model (born 1971)

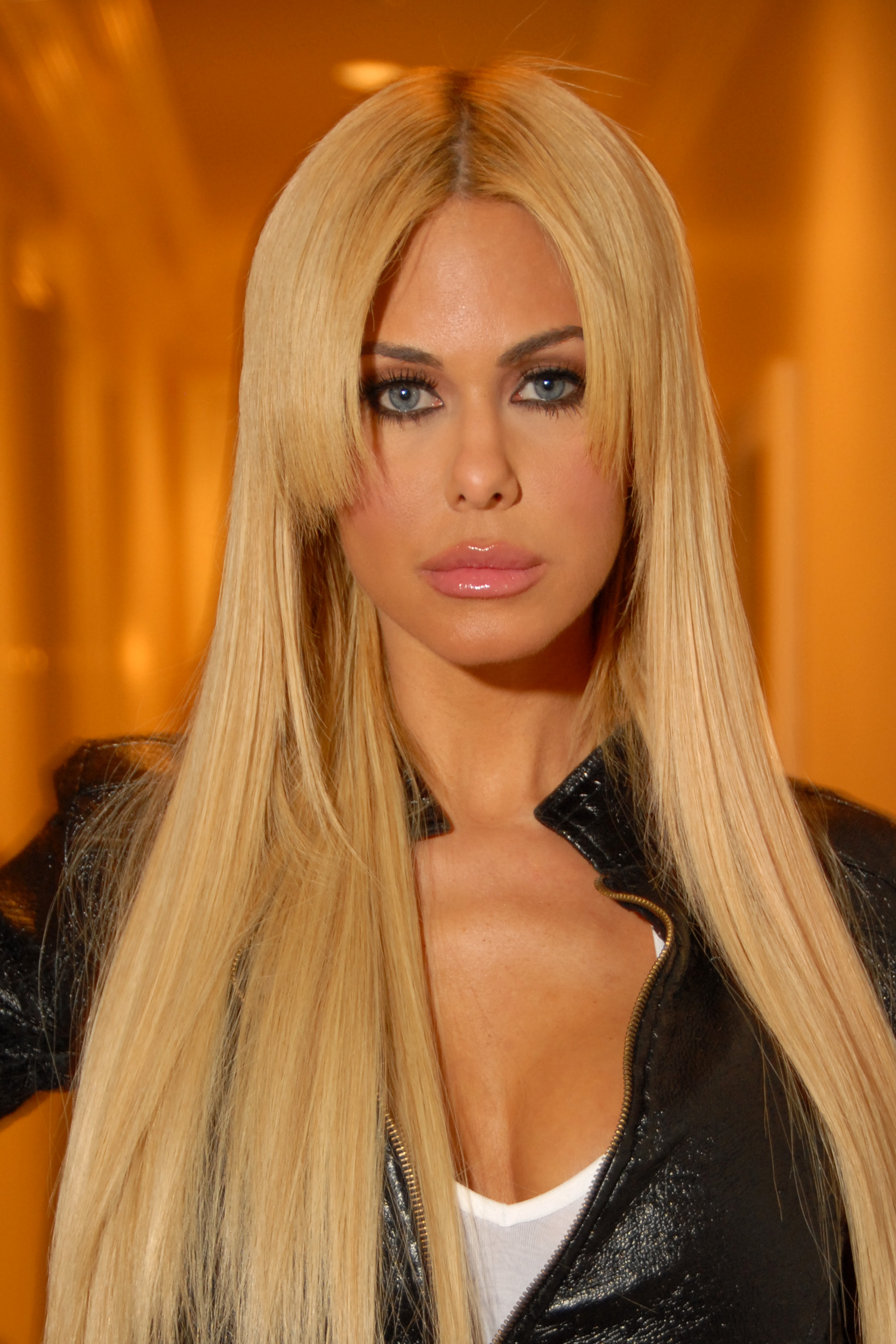
- Sand in 2009
- Born: September 2, 1971 (age 55); San Diego, California, U.S.
- Other name: Shauna Sand Lamas
- Occupations: Actress, model, entertainer
- Spouses: Lorenzo Lamas (m. 1996; div. 2002) Romain Chavent (m. 2006; div. 2008): Laurent Homburger (m. 2011; div. 2011)
- Children: 3
Playboy centerfold appearance
- May 1996
- Preceded by: Gillian Bonner
- Succeeded by: Karin Taylor
Personal details
- Height: 1.63 m (5 ft 4 in)

Shauna Sand (born September 2, 1971) is an American actress, model and Playboy Magazine's Centerfold Playmate of the Month for May 1996.

== Early life ==
Starting at age five, Sand studied ballet, jazz, and theatre. At 11, she enrolled in the School of Creative and Performing Arts in San Diego, California. Upon completion of her dance training she moved back to her hometown of La Jolla, California where she attended La Jolla Country Day School, and later she attended La Jolla High School. Sand graduated from The American University of Paris and obtained a Bachelor of Arts in International Business Administration in Paris, France. She speaks fluent French. Sand is a licensed real estate agent in California and worked with Sotheby's International Realty.

== Career ==
Sand was chosen by Hugh Hefner to be Playboy Magazine's Centerfold and Playmate of the Month for May 1996. She graced the covers of Playboy Magazine in five countries and has appeared in over 200 magazine publications worldwide.

Sand began her acting career with a recurring role on the TV series Renegade (5 episodes). She appeared in TV shows such as Charmed, Las Vegas, starred in the TV series Air America (16 episodes), Family Jewels with Gene Simmons, Dark Realm for Warner Brothers starring opposite Corey Feldman and Eric Roberts, and the comedy The Deviants (2004). She starred in the French TV series Hollywood Girls filmed in Paris, France and Los Angeles, in French, her second language.

== Personal life ==
Sand was married to Renegade actor Lorenzo Lamas from 1996 to 2002. They have three adult daughters.

== Filmography ==
Year	Title	Role	Notes
1995–1997	Renegade	Lake Bradshaw / Ashley/Brunette	Five episodes
1997	Black Dawn	Thumper	(as Shauna Sand-Lamas)
1998	The Chosen One: Legend of the Raven	Emma	
1998	Back to Even	Nurse	
1998	Air America	Dominique	Sixteen episodes
2001	Dark Realm	Mercedes	One episode
2002	The Circuit 2: The Final Punch	Nurse	
2003	Charmed	Sienna	One episode
2004	Las Vegas	Stripper #1	One episode
2004	The Deviants	Mrs. Jones	
2004	Ghost Rock	unknown	(as Shauna Sand-Lamas)
2007	Succubus: Hell Bent	Jacuzzi Woman	
2009	Leave it to Lamas	Herself	
2009	Shauna Sand Exposed	Herself	
2011	L'île des Vérités	Herself	French show TV
2012-2014	Hollywood Girls	Geny G	French show TV; Recurring role (season 1), main role (seasons 2–3)
2015	Botched	Herself	

Victoria Fuller	Kona Carmack	Priscilla Taylor	Gillian Bonner	Shauna Sand	Karin Taylor
Angel Boris	Jessica Lee	Jennifer Allan	Nadine Chanz	Ulrika Ericsson	Victoria Silvstedt
