= Lost Colony Entertainment =

American film and television production company

- Type: Private
- Industry: Television series, Motion pictures
- Founded: 2001
- Founder: R.J. O'Sullivan
- Headquarters: New York, United States
- Key people: R.J. O'Sullivan; Sandra Rayne Garcia
- Website: lostcolonyentertainment.com

Lost Colony Entertainment is an American-based film and television production company that was founded in 2001 by filmmaker R.J. O'Sullivan.

== Film ==
In 2001, Lost Colony began development of a dark political comedy entitled How to Suck the Brain of a President's Daughter. Independent financing was raised; actors Anthony Stewart Head, Lindsay Felton, and Tanya Roberts were attached to star in the film; and Roddy Bottum (from the band Faith No More) came aboard to provide the musical score. However, before production began, the September 11 attacks occurred, and investors, sensitive to the controversial nature of the screenplay, pulled out, causing the project to be shelved.

In 2004, Lost Colony produced an independently-financed feature film entitled Communication Breakdown. The film's premise involved a faceless conglomerate taking over an indie radio station as the station employees struggled to maintain their jobs and their sanity. Described by director Richard O'Sullivan as a tribute to the John Hughes movies of the 1980s, the entire film took place over several hours ala The Breakfast Club and Sixteen Candles. "I always wondered what it would've been like to follow the Brat Pack as they got older," said O'Sullivan. "To see them with real jobs in the real world but still trying to hold on to whatever it was that made them who they were."

In 2006, Lost Colony produced an unsold comedy pilot called Traveling Man. The following year, it produced a second pilot, this one a fantasy adventure, entitled Breach of Heaven. During this same period, it handled production for numerous music videos, including ones for such artists as Always Sunday (featuring Trent Dabbs), The Situationals, Rachel Merchand, Judson, Shawn Gallaway, and Randy Casey (formerly of P.J. & The Terrorists).

On November 3, 2009, it was announced that Lost Colony was developing a romantic comedy feature entitled One Night With You in association with Scott M. Rosenfelt, producer of such films as Home Alone (1990), Mystic Pizza (1988) and Teen Wolf Too (1987). On November 19, 2009, it was reported that Lindsay Lohan, who at the time was in the midst of mounting legal problems centered around drug and alcohol problems, was in talks to play the lead role in One Night With You. On April 27, 2010, Lost Colony head Richard O’Sullivan confirmed the rumors, telling WENN, "It is ready-made for Lindsay. If it happens, it could be her Mickey Rourke comeback. But we're proceeding with extreme caution while the Lohan family sorts through their issues during a very trying time." Despite the backing of Carsten H.W. Lorenz—producer of Harold & Kumar Go to White Castle (2004), Harold & Kumar Escape from Guantanamo Bay (2008), The Grudge (2004), and Independence Day: Resurgence (2016)—it soon became apparent that Lohan, due to her continued legal woes, could not be insured for the film. Rumors then began to swirl that singer Taylor Swift would either replace Lohan in the project or join her in a supporting role, with Penn Badgley taking on the role of the lead character’s love interest. On October 30, 2010, O’Sullivan lambasted the media in an interview with Radar Online, claiming that Lohan was the victim of a double standard. He compared her troubles to those of Charlie Sheen and implied that the media and the public were far more forgiving of Sheen than Lohan. After Lohan was forced back into court due to a parole violation in early 2011, O’Sullivan seemed to abandon the plan of proceeding with the beleaguered actress, telling reporters, “We’re screwed.”

Amidst the public drama surrounding Lohan, Lost Colony also announced plans for two other projects: An original horror film entitled Hallows (later retitled The Ballad of Jimmy Hallows)—which was initially conceived as a vehicle for former adult film star Sasha Grey—and the dark comedy The Genesis of Lincoln (based loosely on the historical book of the same name about Abraham Lincoln by James H. Cathey). Attached to The Genesis of Lincoln (a film-within-a-film about a director attempting to adapt Cathey’s book, only to be derailed after he has an affair with his underage leading actress) was actor Doug Hutchison, who had, himself, recently married sixteen-year-old pop singer Courtney Stodden. Fearing that the public wouldn’t be able to distinguish the film’s character from his real-life persona, Hutchison asked O’Sullivan to make changes in the script. When O’Sullivan refused, Hutchison dropped out of the project.

In February 2012, Lost Colony produced The Dress, a film based on the stage play That Dress, written by Steve Strangio. It starred Castille Landon, James Mount, and Joe Sernio and was produced by Sandra Rayne Garcia. The Dress premiered the following year at the Garden State Film Festival in Asbury Park, New Jersey.

Also in 2012, it was announced that Lost Colony was developing a big-screen adaptation of the novel The Wizard of Seattle, written by multiple-time New York Times bestselling author Kay Hooper. The following year, the company revealed plans for Sabrina's House, a dramatic feature based on the true-life story of Sabrina Greenlee, a woman who overcame childhood sexual abuse, domestic violence, and an attempt on her life which left her blind and facially disfigured, to guide her son DeAndre Hopkins to a career in the NFL.

In 2014, Lost Colony announced plans for the 1920s dramatic feature She Rain, based on the novel by 29-time Emmy winning newsman Michael Cogdill. In 2015, Lost Colony optioned Starborn, a big-screen adaptation of a young adult fiction novel by S.C. Megale (author of the Marvelous Mercer children's book series).

In 2016, Lost Colony and Vrai Moi formed ChuteVerks, a company devoted to the production and distribution of professional wrestling content. In August of that year, ChuteVerks announced that its first show—marketed under the Lucha Ilimitado brand—would take place October 12 from the Yakima Valley Sundome in Yakima, Washington. That show featured such wrestling stars as Rey Mysterio, Jeff Hardy, El Hijo del Santo, El Santo Jr., MVP, Juventud Guerrera, Psicosis, Jeff Cobb, Rey Fenix, Jonathan Gresham, Sonjay Dutt, Su Yung, and more. It was shot as a feature-length motion picture entitled "Lucha Ilimitado vs The State of Washington" and released on DVD and VOD on July 28, 2017.

== Television ==
In 2014, Lost Colony—in association with Vrai Moi—announced plans for an original dramatic series based on the childhood experiences of Gabriel Nunez (whose life as a young adult served as much of the basis for the HBO original series How to Make It in America).
