= Richard O'Sullivan (filmmaker) =

American filmmaker and author (born 1968)

R.J. O'Sullivan
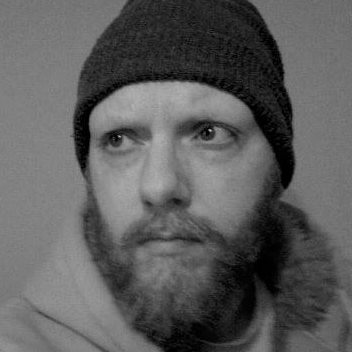
- Born: June 10, 1968 (age 58); Spartanburg, South Carolina United States
- Occupations: Screenwriter, Film director, Film producer
- Years active: 2001-present
- Website: http://www.lostcolonyentertainment.com/

R.J. O'Sullivan (born Richard James O'Sullivan; June 10, 1968) is an American screenwriter, director, producer, cinematographer, film editor, novelist, and founder of Lost Colony Entertainment.

== Film career ==
O'Sullivan began his career as a film producer in 2001, packaging a dark political comedy around a script he had written several years earlier, entitled How to Suck the Brain of a President's Daughter. Independent financing was raised; actors Anthony Stewart Head, Lindsay Felton, and Tanya Roberts were attached to star in the film; and Roddy Bottum (from the band Faith No More) came aboard to provide the musical score. However, before production began, the September 11 attacks occurred, and investors, sensitive to the controversial nature of the screenplay, pulled out, causing the project to be shelved.

In 2003, after scripting a straight-to-video release called AfterLife, O’Sullivan began working as a writer for the NBC television network's Peabody and Emmy Award-winning The More You Know series (writing PSA's for such stars as David Schwimmer, Goran Visnjic, Sharif Atkins, Christopher Meloni, Brittany Snow, and Donald Trump). His work, focusing on family communication and cultural diversity, helped garner NBC numerous honors, including a Promax Award and a Lambda Legal Liberty Award.

In early April 2004, O’Sullivan began work on his feature film directorial debut, a low-budget independent comedy about a group of employees in a rock & roll radio station, called Communication Breakdown. Co-written by O’Sullivan and one of the film's stars, actor Dan Lashley), principal photography took place at the studios of Blue Ridge Motion Pictures in Asheville, North Carolina, wrapping production in early May of that same year. Upon completion, the film received a limited release.

In 2005, O’Sullivan worked as an Associate Producer on a series of motorsports documentaries featuring the likes of Travis Pastrana (star of MTV's Nitro Circus), Nate Adams, and Andy Bell. The films—entitled The Enduro at Erzberg, Freestyle Prague, and Travis Pastrana's Baja Diaries—aired on NBCSN in 2006.

In 2006, O'Sullivan shot an unsold comedy pilot called Traveling Man. The following year, he shot a second pilot, this one a fantasy adventure, entitled Breach of Heaven. During this same period, he helmed numerous music videos, including ones for such artists as Always Sunday (featuring Trent Dabbs), The Situationals, Rachel Merchand, Judson, Shawn Gallaway, and Randy Casey (formerly of P.J. & The Terrorists).

In 2009, he produced numerous segments for the NBCUniversal-owned digital channel Cozi TV, and for the New York Yankees' YES Network (Yankees Entertainment and Sports Network). O'Sullivan also shot footage on former World Boxing Association junior welterweight champion Vivian Harris' comeback for a syndicated reality pilot.

On November 3, 2009, it was announced that a romantic comedy script written by O'Sullivan and Lashley entitled One Night With You was being developed for the big screen in association with Scott M. Rosenfelt, producer of such films as Home Alone (1990), Mystic Pizza (1988) and Teen Wolf Too (1987). On November 19, 2009, it was reported that Lindsay Lohan, who at the time was in the midst of mounting legal problems centered around drug and alcohol problems, was in talks to play the lead role in One Night With You. On April 27, 2010, O’Sullivan confirmed the rumors, telling WENN, "It is ready-made for Lindsay. If it happens, it could be her Mickey Rourke comeback. But we're proceeding with extreme caution while the Lohan family sorts through their issues during a very trying time." Despite the backing of Carsten H.W. Lorenz—producer of Harold & Kumar Go to White Castle (2004), Harold & Kumar Escape from Guantanamo Bay (2008), The Grudge (2004), and Independence Day: Resurgence (2016)—it soon became apparent that Lohan, due to her continued legal woes, could not be insured for the film. Rumors then began to swirl that singer Taylor Swift would either replace Lohan in the project or join her in a supporting role, with Penn Badgley taking on the role of the lead character's love interest. On October 30, 2010, O’Sullivan lambasted the media in an interview with Radar Online, claiming that Lohan was the victim of a double standard. He compared her troubles to those of Charlie Sheen and implied that the media and the public were far more forgiving of Sheen than Lohan. After Lohan was forced back into court due to a parole violation in early 2011, O’Sullivan seemed to abandon the plan of proceeding with the beleaguered actress, telling reporters, “We’re screwed.”

While dealing with the Lohan situation, O’Sullivan also announced plans for two other projects: An original horror film entitled Hallows (later retitled The Ballad of Jimmy Hallows)—which was initially conceived as a vehicle for former adult film star Sasha Grey—and the dark comedy The Genesis of Lincoln (based loosely on the historical book of the same name about Abraham Lincoln by James H. Cathey). Attached to The Genesis of Lincoln (a film-within-a-film about a director attempting to adapt Cathey's book, only to be derailed after he has an affair with his underage leading actress) was actor Doug Hutchison, who had, himself, recently married sixteen-year-old pop singer Courtney Stodden. Fearing that the public wouldn't be able to distinguish the film's character from his real-life persona, Hutchison asked O’Sullivan to make changes in the script. When O’Sullivan refused, Hutchison dropped out of the project.

In 2012, it was announced that O'Sullivan would adapt the novel The Wizard of Seattle, written by multiple-time New York Times bestselling author Kay Hooper, for the screen. The following year, he signed on to write and direct Sabrina's House based on the true-life story of Sabrina Greenlee, a woman who overcame childhood sexual abuse, domestic violence, and an attempt on her life which left her blind and facially disfigured, to guide her son DeAndre Hopkins to a career in the NFL.

In February 2012, O'Sullivan directed The Dress, a film based on the stage play That Dress, written by Steve Strangio. It starred Castille Landon, James Mount, and Joe Sernio and was produced by Sandra Rayne Garcia. The Dress premiered the following year at the Garden State Film Festival in Asbury Park, New Jersey.

In 2014, O'Sullivan was tapped to adapt the 1920s rural drama She Rain based on the novel by 29-time Emmy winning newsman Michael Cogdill. That same year, he began work on creating and developing an original dramatic series with Gabriel Nunez (whose experiences as a young adult served as much of the basis for the HBO original series How to Make It in America). The premise of the O'Sullivan/Nunez collaboration centers around Nunez's earlier childhood experiences growing up on the streets of New York City. In 2015, O’Sullivan penned Starborn, a big-screen adaptation of a science-fiction novel by S.C. Megale (author of the Marvelous Mercer children's book series). Both projects were slated to be part of a co-production partnership between O'Sullivan's Lost Colony Entertainment, Sandra Rayne Garcia's Vrai Moi, and Michael Cogdill's HeartStrong Media.

In 2016, O'Sullivan and Garcia formed ChuteVerks, a company devoted to the production and distribution of professional wrestling content. In August of that year, ChuteVerks announced that its first show—marketed under the Lucha Ilimitado brand—would take place October 12 from the Yakima Valley Sundome in Yakima, Washington. That show featured such wrestling stars as Rey Mysterio, Jeff Hardy, El Hijo del Santo, El Santo Jr., MVP, Rey Fénix, Juventud Guerrera, Psicosis, Jeff Cobb, Jonathan Gresham, Sonjay Dutt, Ethan H. D., Mike Santiago, King Khash, Su Yung, La Avispa, Kate Carney, Ave Rex, and Sonico. It was shot as a feature-length motion picture entitled "Lucha Ilimitado vs The State of Washington" and released on DVD and VOD on July 28, 2017.

== Personal life ==
O'Sullivan currently resides in New York, New York.
