= The Wishwall Foundation =

American nonprofit

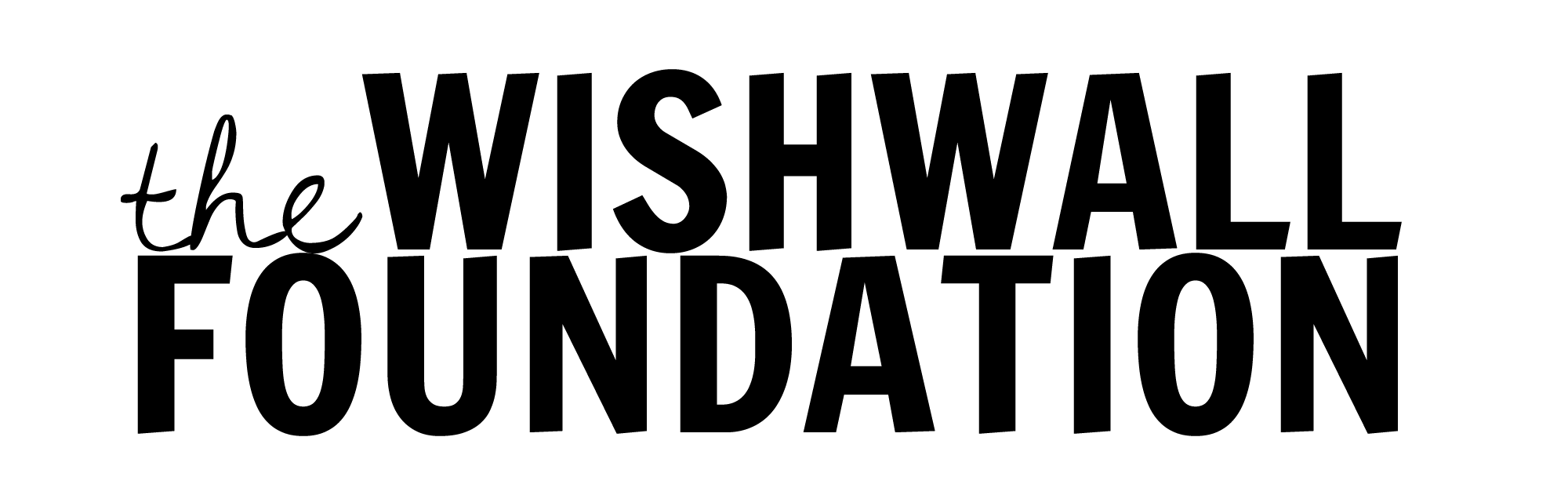

The Wishwall Foundation is an American nonprofit 501(c)(3) charitable organization and social community.

== History ==
In 2015, Simonetta Lein established foundation to address social issues such as literacy, poverty, and women's safety while granting wishes.

Lein established the initial Wishwall in Philadelphia during the September 2015 visit of Pope Francis.

== Programs ==
The foundation collaborates with other non-profit groups that promote social integration and the defense of human rights and with companies that wish to sponsor worthy initiatives.

Through the project "Christmas with the Wishmaker," the foundation focused on Christmas for vulnerable children in Nigeria.
