= Cogdill =

Cogdill is a surname. Notable people with the surname include:

- Dave Cogdill (1950–2017), American politician
- Gail Cogdill (1937–2016), American football player
- Michael Cogdill (born 1961), American journalist, novelist, screenwriter, and film producer

== See also ==
- Cordill
