= Simonetta Lein =

Italian-American TV personality (born 1983)

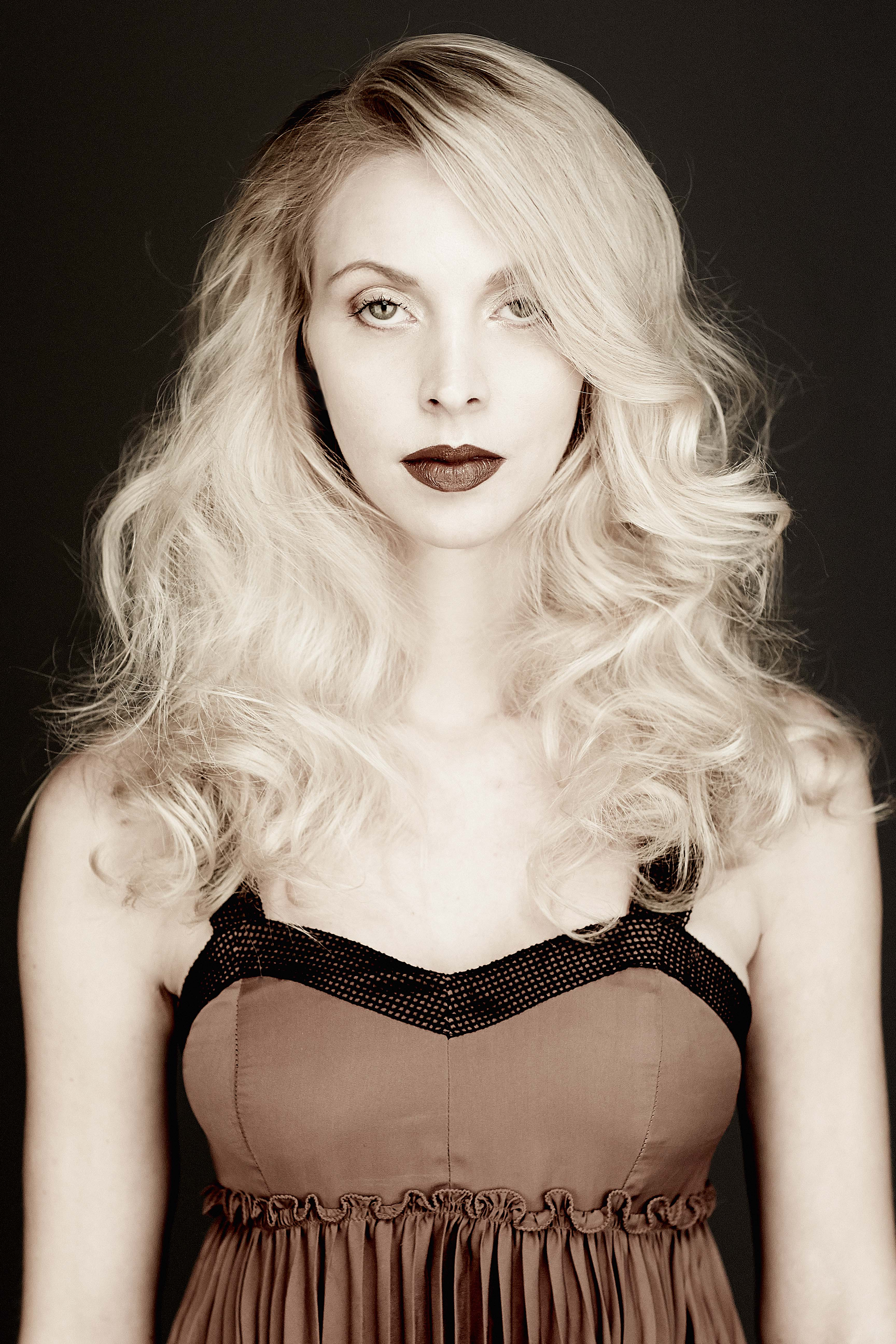
- Born: February 7, 1983 (age 42); Pordenone, Italy

Simonetta Lein (born February 7, 1983) is a TV personality, TV host, model and businesswoman. Lein has won the Celebrity Media Personality & Influencer of the year 2022 award through the World Influencers Bloggers Award at the Cannes Film Festival. She has modeled for designer Stevie Boi during New York Fashion Week and for Richie Rich at Madison Square Garden.

== Career ==
She has been awarded the TV Personality of the year by Golden Wings awards in Dubai.

During the pandemic, she started "The Simonetta Lein Show" which is now listed as the top short-form celebrity talk show worldwide. She has interviewed celebrities on the show including Steve-O, Mark Cuban, Marcus Lemonis, Ceelo Green, Candace Cameron Bure, Danny Trejo, Kathy Ireland, Jerry Springer and Shaggy.

She has written a book, Everything Is Possible: A Novel About the Power of Dreams, which was published by Sperling & Kupfer in 2013.

As a model, she has been featured in Vogue Italia, Vanity Fair Italy and Cosmopolitan. Simonetta has modelled for several fashion designers and photographers including Bruno Oliviero and Giovanni Gastel. She is the CEO and co-founder of Ausonia Partners, a media and public relations agency headquartered in Pennsylvania. She has also been cited as one of the top 100 fashion and social media influencers. Lein was also featured on the cover story of Glamour and Chloé Magazine

In 2017, Lein starred in the pilot of an Influencer Reality Show - Brick & Portal Weekend: NYC Chapter with Anjelika Kour and Heidi Nezarudin.

Lein is a former columnist for Vanity Fair Italy, D di Repubblica, and La Voce Di New York. She has been featured in Vogue Italy, Vanity Fair Italy, Cosmopolitan, and more.

In 2018, her work at The Wishwall foundation was extended to a television program called The Wishwall, produced by Rocco Leo Gaglioti on Amazon Prime.

== Philanthropy ==
=== The Wishwall ===
In 2015, Lein founded The Wishwall Foundation, an initiative to address social causes like literacy, poverty, women's safety and to help make wishes come true. In 2018, her work at the foundation was extended to a television program called The Wishwall, produced by award-winning producer and director Rocco Leo Gaglioti of the FNL Network and is now available worldwide on all smart TVs and Apple iOS and Android apps. It provided funding for the renovation of the Boripe Community Primary Health Care Center in Osun State, Southwest Nigeria.
