= Lost Colony (disambiguation) =

The Lost Colony or Roanoke Colony was the first English colony in the New World, which was abandoned and the colonists never found.

Lost Colony may also refer to:

- The Lost Colony (play), a play based on the history of Roanoke Colony
- Artemis Fowl and the Lost Colony (2006), a fantasy novel by Eoin Colfer
- Deadlands: Lost Colony, a tabletop role-playing game published by Pinnacle Entertainment Group
- Wraiths of Roanoke or Lost Colony, a 2007 supernatural film about the English colony
- "The Lost Colony", a 1993 episode of the Lovejoy
- Lost Colony Entertainment, an American-based production company
- PULSAR: Lost Colony, a 2021 video game

== See also ==
- Fort Raleigh National Historic Site, which commemorates Roanoke Colony
- Jamestown: Legend of the Lost Colony, a 2011 video game
