= The Mother/Daughter Experiment: Celebrity Edition =

American reality television show

- Genre: Reality
- Created by: SallyAnn Salsano
- No. of seasons: 1
- No. of episodes: 8

Production
- Running time: 41-42 minutes

Original release
- Release: March 1 – July 5, 2016

The Mother/Daughter Experiment: Celebrity Edition is an American reality television series that premiered on March 1, 2016, on the Lifetime cable network. The show is about six mother/daughter pairs who try to repair their broken relationships and rebuild their bonds. With therapist Dr. Debbie Magids guiding them through explosive therapy and intense exercises.

== Cast ==
- Natalie Nunn – former cast member of Bad Girls Club and Karen Nunn
- Heidi Montag – former cast member of The Hills and Darlene Egelhoff
- Kim Richards – former cast member of The Real Housewives of Beverly Hills and Kimberly Jackson
- Shar Jackson – actress known for Moesha and Cassie Jackson
- Courtney Stodden – former cast member of Couples Therapy and Krista Keller
- Jessica Canseco – former cast member of Hollywood Exes and Josie Canseco

== Episodes ==
No.	Title	Original release date	US viewers (millions)
1	"The Mother of All Drama"	March 1, 2016	0.638
Six celebrity mother and daughter duos live in a house for eight weeks and work with a therapist to try to repair their dysfunctional relationships. Heidi Pratt arrives intoxicated and ready to fight. Later, in an explosive therapy session, Courtney Stodden accuses her mom of an affair with her husband. Kim Richards and her daughter Kimberly try to work through their issues in her return to television.
2	"Headlines Don't Lie..."	March 8, 2016	0.512
The house is rocked by Krista's betrayal of her daughter Courtney. Kim finally admits that she had an alcohol problem and went to rehab when she is confronted about her tabloid headlines. Josie starts to unravel because she is tired of her mom Jessica's hard-partying ways.
3	"Grave Regrets"	March 15, 2016	0.410
The women are forced to face the death of their loved ones in order to help them realize that life is too short to fight with them. Upon hearing the news, Shar breaks down at the thought of losing Cassie and Kim turns on her daughter Kimberly. When Natalie thinks people are talking about her behind her back, she has an explosive confrontation with Kim and Jessica.
4	"The Truth Hurts"	March 25, 2016	0.523
With communication being such a huge issue in the house, things get intense when Dr. Debbie has the duos reveal painful issues that they have been keeping secret. The house erupts into chaos when Krista finally reveals the truth about what happened between her and Courtney's husband.
5	"The Hot Seat"	April 8, 2016	N/A
After Krista finally admits her betrayal, the daughters console a devastated Courtney. Tensions rise between Jessica and Heidi when Jessica confronts Heidi about her drinking. And in an explosive therapy session, the women take the hot seat to confront each other on issues they are too afraid to face.
6	"Housewife vs. Bad Girl"	April 15, 2016	N/A
Josie gets offered a modeling job that could force her to leave the house for good, upsetting Jessica. Heidi gossips about people being fake in the house and not confronting each other with their issues, which leads to the mother of all fights! It's the Beverly Hills Housewife vs. the Bad Girl!
7	"Three's a Crowd"	April 22, 2016	N/A
Courtney's husband Doug comes to the house for therapy and Dr. Debbie tries to get to the bottom of it all. Did Krista and Doug have an affair? In therapy, Karen confronts Kim for calling her daughter a bully.
8	"Goodbyes Are Never Easy"	July 5, 2016	N/A
Karen and Natalie hit rock bottom and the paramedics are called as Kim nearly passes out in therapy. Courtney contemplates leaving the house without Krista.

== Legal action ==
Shortly after its premiere, Krista Keller, the mother of Courtney Stodden, threatened to sue the Lifetime network over her portrayal on the show.
