= List of Couples Therapy episodes =

This is a list of episodes from the reality television series Couples Therapy, which aired on the cable network VH1.

== Series overview ==
Season	Episodes	Originally released	
Season	Episodes	First released	Last released
1	8	March 21, 2012	May 9, 2012
2	10	October 3, 2012	November 28, 2012
3	10	June 12, 2013	August 21, 2013
4	10	January 2, 2014	March 6, 2014
5	10	September 10, 2014	November 12, 2014
Specials	2	September 3, 2014	September 10, 2014
6	10	October 7, 2015	December 9, 2015

== Episodes ==
=== Season 1 (2012) ===
No. overall	No. in season	Title	Original release date	US viewers (millions)
1	1	"Couples Therapy Begins"	March 21, 2012	0.39
Four of the five couples are welcomed to the house while Dr. Jenn describes their stories. Angelina Pivarnick and Chris Nirschel are the first to arrive. Next, DMX arrives on his own and shows insatisfaction with having to share rooms with his 6-year stranged wife, Tashera Simmons, and with not being allowed to drink and use drugs while in the house. Later on, he also says he did not know he was coming into a therapy facility and that he feels like he is in prison. Tashera arrives next. Vienna Girardi and Kasey Kahl arrive separately because they've been separated for several weeks and Dr. Jenn has a session with both of them as soon as possible. Linda Hogan and Charlie Hill arrive next. The couples have their first group session and the first night of Couples Therapy explodes with an intense fight between rapper DMX and his wife Tashera.
2	2	"Opening Up"	March 28, 2012	0.66
The fight between rapper DMX and his estranged wife Tashera continues and things are no better between Angelina and her boyfriend Chris Nirschel, who argue in the middle of the night and well into the morning. Dr. Jenn and Dr. Mike are able to calm the couples down and accomplish some meaningful therapy in a group session, and that afternoon the fifth couple, Reichen Lehmkuhl and Rodiney Santiago, arrives and that adds an interesting dynamic to the group. Later, after an intense and emotional therapy session, DMX refuses to attend a mandatory group session, and lashes out at Dr. Jenn and the camera crews.
3	3	"Rebuilding Trust"	April 4, 2012	0.39
Tashera struggles to keep DMX from quitting Couples Therapy as he continues to rebel against the strict rules of the facility. Linda Hogan's trust in Charley is put to the test when she reads his Facebook page. Kasey finds a text message on Vienna's cell phone from another guy she's been dating, which sets off an emotional group session, and ultimately leads Kasey to a heartbreaking personal breakthrough, but Vienna's reaction to Kasey's breakthrough threatens to destroy their fragile relationship once and for all.
4	4	"Fighting Fairly"	April 11, 2012	0.28
Things get worse for the couples as they approach the half way point in Couples Therapy. A war between Chris and Angelina erupts, this time because of Chris's sexual frustration and an alleged hidden cell phone Angelina has smuggled onto the facility. We learn just how much Reichen and Rodiney have both hurt one another when they finally begin to open up about their painful past, and though it seems as if Vienna and Kasey are making healthy progress, their relationship unravels.
5	5	"Childhood Trauma"	April 18, 2012	0.55
Dr. Jenn and her staff start to look closer at the underlying causes of the couples' relationship issues. In an emotional group session, Angelina opens up about her tumultuous childhood and her trust issues with men, Reichen talks about being bullied in grade school for being gay, and DMX shares a horrific story of abuse that has clearly shaped the way he treats women to this day. Angelina's trust issues are tested when Chris receives a questionable card from his manager, and DMX struggles with the idea of facing his estranged mother after Dr. Jenn recommends they reunite and attempt to reconcile.
6	6	"Putting Love To The Test"	April 25, 2012	0.67
DMX has a heartbreaking reunion with his estranged mother and confronts her about abandoning him when he was a boy. Chris's manager Nicole flies in from New York to address Angelina's allegations that she's in love with Chris, and a trip to an engagement ring store stirs up some romantic feelings in Vienna, but her feelings are not for Kasey.
7	7	"Following Your Heart"	May 2, 2012	0.32
Linda Hogan meets with Dr. Jenn to discuss her future with Charley, and the fact that her mother does not support their relationship. Dr. Jenn helps Vienna process her feelings for her ex boyfriend Lee, and they decide that the best course of action is to be honest with Kasey, and to meet with Lee to find out where he stands. Kasey does not take it well, and things take a turn for the worse when Lee arrives as Kasey intends to confront him physically and tries to break into Dr. Jenn's office while she's in session with Lee. Jenns comes out and talks to Kasey which eventually calms him down. Dr. Jenn tells her the she should take a year as a single to get to know herself.
8	8	"Season Finale"	May 9, 2012	0.45
Dr. Jenn and her staff do their best to help the couples resolve their relationship issues once and for all. Vienna has an emotional reunion with her ex boyfriend Lee and Dr. Jenn concludes it is best if Vienna spends a year on her own. A group meeting is called and Dr. Jenn breaks the news to the group that Vienna is leaving that night and gives them a chance to say goodbye to her. Linda confronts her mother Gail over her lack of support for Charley, and Tashera asks Dr. Jenn for help finding closure with DMX. The couples have an emotional final group session, and that evening Charley proposes to Linda.

=== Season 2 (2012) ===
No. overall	No. in season	Title	Original release date	US viewers (millions)
9	1	"Couples Therapy Begins"	October 3, 2012	0.54
Four of the five new couples are introduced to Dr. Berman. Shayne Lamas' reaction to Nik Richie's comments about their marriage leads to an argument over their sleeping arrangements, and the pouring of wine onto a mattress. Courtney Stodden and Doug Hutchison's controversial relationship leads to heated exchanges with and Shayne and Nik.
10	2	"Opening Up"	October 10, 2012	0.60
On the first night, Nik refuses Doug demand for an apology for Nik's statements about him and Courtney. In Process Group, Berman asks each couple about their darkest moment. Courtney and Doug relate a fight they had after a stranger gave Courtney his phone number; Alex relates a fight six months earlier in which she and Simon became verbally abusive, after which Alex demanded a divorce; Tiny relates an argument following JoJo's release from the hospital for reasons relating to his drinking; Nik talks about a time one month into his relationship with Shayne that she found text messages from another woman. The fifth and final couple, rapper Todd "Too Short" Shaw and his on-again, off-again girlfriend Monica Payne, arrive. Speaking with Shayne and Nik, Berman observes that Shayne's shopping is a non-verbal reaction to Nik's website. After leaving the dinner table over Courtney's clothing and dress, Shayne threatens to leave the program.
11	3	"Communication issues"	October 17, 2012	0.59
Continuing from the previous episode, Novia convinces a distraught Shayne to stay. In Process Group, Berman talks to the couples about the lies that they have used to maintain lives as public figures. Nik apologises to Doug for his prior language, but tension between them continues. Tiny attempts to talk to JoJo about his alcoholism, but he dismisses her concerns. Alex McCord and Simon van Kempen explore their relationship problems, but end up fighting over them. Berman and Tom Carouso observe communication difficulties in Alex and Simon, who bicker over minutiae but do not discuss specific issues regarding their relationship, and Doug and Courtney, who have trouble speaking due to Courtney's tendency to become distracted. Todd struggles with whether he can maintain his public image as a womanizer while staying in a committed, monogamous relationship.
12	4	"Exposing the Real Issues"	October 21, 2012	0.55
Because of the limited amount of time that Courtney, a minor, can legally be allowed to spend at the treatment center, Doug must do without her during a couples yoga session, which upsets him. Berman speaks to the group about trust, during which Courtney reveals that she still desires friendship from her ex-boyfriend, but romance from Doug. Dow and Berman talk to Tiny and JoJo about his alcoholism, but JoJoe remains obstinate. Shayne expresses aversion to Courtney's behavior and clothing during a group trip bowling.
13	5	"Power Dynamics"	October 24, 2012	0.70
In Process Group, Berman talks to the couples about which member of each couple has the power in the relationship. Individually, she talks to Shayne and Nik about their cyclic fighting and Shayne's dismissal of Nik's feelings, to Todd and Monica about Todd's commitment to monogamy. To make a point to the couples about how fortunate they are to have each other, Berman arranges a group session in which the couples learn about the life and loves of Israeli psychologist Dr. Moti Peleg and his wife, Ronit. Berman implements a dress code under which Courtney must wear less revealing clothing, but Courtney is displeased with this.
14	6	"Playing By the Rules"	October 31, 2012	0.54
Courtney reluctantly complies with the new dress code, which she characterizes as a "backlash for being beautiful". In an emotional Process Group about past trauma, Alex talks about the deterioration of her father from Alzheimer's disease that began when she was nine, and his eventual death; Tiny talks about the childhood molestation she suffered and how it damaged her ability to trust men; Courtney's inability to open up in a similar manner offends the other couples. Alex and Simon later speak with Berman about how her trauma relates to her current relationship with her mother and her trust issues. After Courtney refuses to continue complying with the dress code, she is evicted from the program, and leaves the treatment center with Doug.
15	7	"Dourtney's Aftermath"	November 7, 2012	N/A
Despite the relief felt by the couples in the wake of Doug and Courtney's departure, Dr. Berman criticizes some of the other couples for their aggressive behavior towards Doug and Courtney. Alex has a one-on-one session with Berman regarding the control issues Alex has with her mother. In a Process Group about love and loss, the couples learn the story of Scott Bolzan and his wife, Joan, who suffered a unique tragedy. Alex's mother visits the treatment center, where she speaks to Alex and Berman about unresolved questions about the day Alex's father died. Berman informs the group that Doug and Courtney will return to the treatment center.
16	8	"Putting Love to the Test"	November 14, 2012	0.55
Doug and Courtney return after promising to abide by the center's rules. The other couples take responsibility for their prior behavior and welcome them back, but when Simon and Alex try to explain their concerns, Doug and Courtney dismiss Simon as "angry". Dr. Berman speaks with Courtney's mother, Krista Stodden, to learn about Doug and Courtney's relationship. Berman talks to Todd, whom she says has made progress, but has still not firmly committed to whether he wants a monogamous relationship. Todd and Monica and Nick and Shayne go out on private dates in order to reconnect romantically. While Todd surprises Monica with his tenderness and his promise to commit to her, Nik and Shayne's outing is marred by squabbling.
17	9	"The Final Confrontations"	November 21, 2012	0.48
Berman talks to Nik and Shayne about the fight during their date. In a Process Group about threats to their relationships, Doug and Courtney talk about being cut off from Doug's family, while Tiny and JoJo talk about his drinking. He later tells Tiny he wants her to leave as well. Doug talks to Nik and later to Berman about his relationship with Courtney and how it cost him his family. Berman introduces the group to singer/songwriter Doug Johnson and Eddie and Norma Kennedy, in order to learn the story of the Kennedys' daughter, Sara Elizabeth.
18	10	"Season Finale"	November 28, 2012	0.57
JoJo agrees to go to Alcoholics Anonymous. Berman talks to Courtney and Krista about Krista's life as Courtney's manager. When Doug phones his mother, with whom he has not spoken for fourteen months, she invites Doug and Courtney to visit her. In the final Process Group, the couples thank Berman for her work with them. Having never had a proper wedding ceremony, Nik proposes to Shayne, and the two renew their wedding vows in a ceremony on the grounds of the treatment center.

=== Season 3 (2013) ===
No. overall	No. in season	Title	Original release date	US viewers (millions)
19	1	"Couples Therapy Begins"	June 12, 2013	0.54
20	2	"Opening Up"	June 19, 2013	0.72
21	3	"Love, by the Numbers"	June 26, 2013	0.61
22	4	"Brutally Honest"	July 10, 2013	0.60
23	5	"Echoes From the Past"	July 17, 2013	0.51
24	6	"Fear of the Future"	July 24, 2013	0.57
25	7	"Trouble in Paradise"	July 31, 2013	0.49
26	8	"Picking Up the Pieces"	August 7, 2013	0.57
27	9	"Tying Up Loose Ends"	August 14, 2013	0.67
28	10	"Season Finale"	August 21, 2013	0.65

=== Season 4 (2014) ===
No. overall	No. in season	Title	Original release date	US viewers (millions)
29	1	"Therapy Begins"	January 2, 2014	0.90
30	2	"Love Hurts"	January 9, 2014	0.80
31	3	"New Couple Controversy"	January 16, 2014	0.96
32	4	"Fess Up"	January 23, 2014	0.83
33	5	"Player for Life"	January 30, 2014	0.97
34	6	"Get Real"	February 6, 2014	0.90
35	7	"Crumbs Of Love"	February 13, 2014	0.91
36	8	"Repeating The Same Patterns"	February 20, 2014	0.71
37	9	"Fired Up"	February 27, 2014	0.68
38	10	"Final Goodbye"	March 6, 2014	0.58

=== Season 5 (2014) ===
No. overall	No. in season	Title	Original release date	US viewers (millions)
39	1	"A Fresh Start"	September 10, 2014	1.02
40	2	"Death Trap"	September 17, 2014	0.71
41	3	"Under the Microscope"	September 24, 2014	0.48
42	4	"Called Out"	October 1, 2014	0.66
43	5	"The Truth is Out There"	October 8, 2014	0.66
44	6	"I've Got The Power"	October 15, 2014	0.72
45	7	"Reflections of the Past"	October 22, 2014	0.56
46	8	"Decision Time"	October 29, 2014	0.65
47	9	"Meatball Problems"	November 5, 2014	0.41
48	10	"Fighting 'Till the End"	November 12, 2014	0.63

=== Specials (2014) ===
Title	Original release date	US viewers (millions)
"Couples Therapy Reunion Part 1"	September 3, 2014	N/A
"Couples Therapy Reunion Part 2"	September 10, 2014	0.63

=== Season 6 (2015) ===
No. overall	No. in season	Title	Original release date	US viewers (millions)
49	1	"The Journey Begins"	October 7, 2015	0.55
50	2	"Enter the Drama"	October 7, 2015	0.55
51	3	"Texts, Lies, and Tampon-gate"	October 14, 2015	0.41
52	4	"Gene Therapy"	October 21, 2015	0.52
53	5	"Joe and Kaylin Return"	October 28, 2015	0.58
54	6	"Putting Out Fires Without Getting Burned"	November 4, 2015	0.55
55	7	"The Power Exchange"	November 11, 2015	0.57
56	8	"Remembrance of Things Past"	November 18, 2015	0.57
57	9	"Let's Talk About Sex"	December 2, 2015	0.58
58	10	"Love Is the Answer"	December 9, 2015	0.49
