= Courtney Stodden =

American media personality (born 1994)

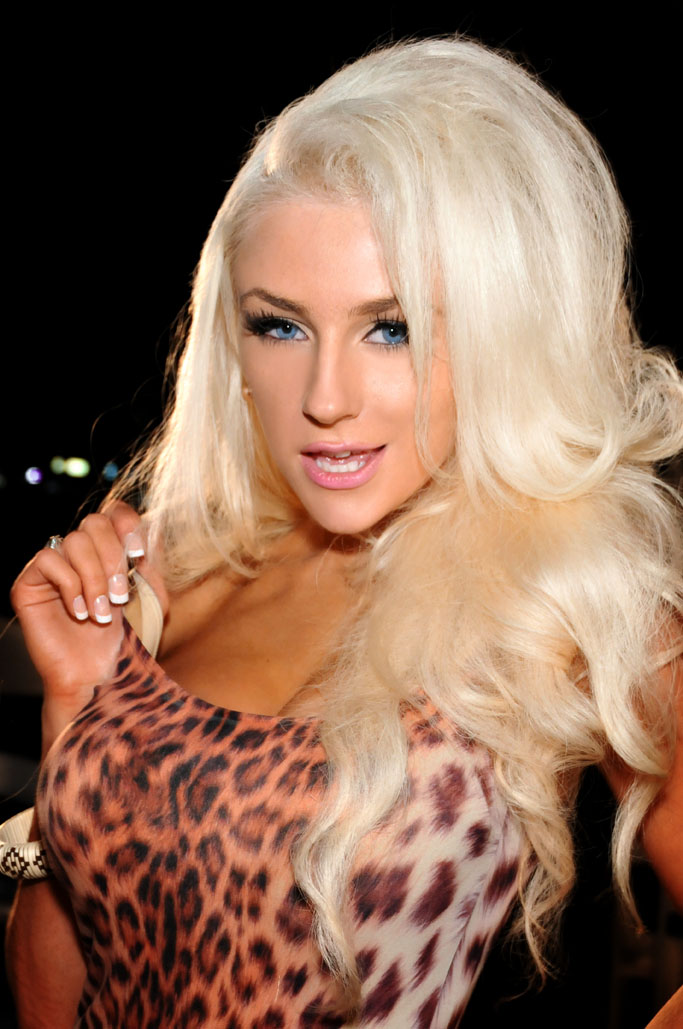
- Stodden in 2013
- Born: Courtney Alexis Stodden; August 29, 1994 (age 32); Tacoma, Washington, U.S.
- Other name: Ember
- Occupations: Media personality; model; singer
- Years active: 2009–present
- Height: 5 ft 3 in (1.60 m)
- Spouses: Doug Hutchison (m. 2011; div. 2020); Jared Safier (m. 2024)
- Musical career
- Genres: Pop; dance
- Instrument: Vocals
- Label: Rich Kid Mafia

Courtney Alexis Stodden (born August 29, 1994) is an American media personality, model, and singer. After competing in beauty pageants in her (Note: Stodden uses both she/her and they/them pronouns. This article uses she/her for consistency.) home state of Washington and releasing original music, then 16-year-old Stodden came to international attention after being wed to 51-year-old actor Doug Hutchison in 2011. The controversy and media attention surrounding the marriage led Stodden to appear on the reality television shows Couples Therapy (2012) and Celebrity Big Brother (2013), and later appearances on Reality Ex-Wives (2015), The Mother/Daughter Experiment (2016), Celebs Go Dating (2017), and Courtney (2020). Later, Stodden became an active advocate for animal rights and campaigned publicly against child marriage.

== Early life, family and education ==
Courtney Alexis Stodden was born on August 29, 1994, in Tacoma, Washington to Krista Kay Keller and Alex John Stodden. She has two sisters, Ashley and Brittany, 9 and 11 years older than Stodden. Stodden describes her childhood as "beautiful and fun", stating that she was "extremely spoiled, in a good way." From a very young age, Stodden has stated that her passion was singing and writing her own music. She was raised in Ocean Shores, Washington.

In 2017, Stodden told Radar Online that she was bullied and abused over her mature looks from age 12 when she was in the sixth grade until her mother pulled her out of school at 16. Bullies had reportedly attacked her and fractured her left arm, and she felt unsafe. She was subsequently homeschooled through an online private Christian academy.

== Career ==
=== 2009–2014 ===
Stodden began in the entertainment industry as a youth by modeling. In 2009, Stodden hosted a cable access TV show produced by North Beach Community TV in Ocean Shores, The Courtney Stodden Show, which ran for five episodes. In October 2009, Stodden competed as Miss Ocean Shores Teen USA in the 2010 Miss Washington Teen USA pageant, though she did not win the title. In 2010, Stodden released the original songs "Car Candy", "Crazy", "Don't Put It on Me", "Hurting People", and "We Are America". Star Observer ranked "Don't Put It on Me" as number eleven on their list of The 11 Best Songs of '11. Stodden said, "'Don't Put It On Me' is a kind of tongue-in-cheek song that I didn't take seriously at all, but it obviously had a good message to it." Stodden's mother, Krista Keller, initially served as Stodden's manager, but quit in May 2015, citing "creative differences". During their marriage, Stodden was managed by Hutchison. In July 2012, Stodden and Hutchison were interviewed about their relationship on the Fox talk show Father Albert, in an episode of ABC's Good Morning America, and E! News.

The couple appeared as cast members in the second season of the VH1 reality television series Couples Therapy, which premiered in October 2012. The series features publicly known couples receiving therapy for relationship problems. According to Stodden, the couple enrolled in therapy to resolve "age-difference issues such as communication." Despite criticism leveled at the couple, Dr. Jenn Berman, her therapist on the show, opined that she did not believe that Hutchison deliberately sought out young people, saying, "He's not a predator.... This is not a guy who was seeking out teenagers. He was teaching a class, she wanted to be an actress, it was an acting class ... And that's how it started." Though Berman was eventually surprised by the dynamic between the two, she commented on her initial hesitations about working with the couple, saying, "I believe it was the wrong decision to let a 16-year-old marry a man in his 50s. It's uncomfortable to see... [at first] I said to my producer, 'I think this guy is a pedophile...I don't know if I can work with these people.' I don't condone it, but I do see that this is a married couple that is genuinely married and she has marital issues that needed to be worked on. I came in saying, 'She's a victim, he's a predator.' What I found out was that she has a lot more power in this relationship and he is far more powerless than I expected. His family has completely disowned him... He unfortunately has nothing besides her." Hutchison was also defended by Stodden's mother, Krista Keller, who praised Hutchison for the kindness with which he treated Stodden.

In August 2013, Stodden became a housemate on the twelfth season of the British version of Celebrity Big Brother but was evicted on Day 21, two days before the season finale, after receiving the fewest votes to save against Carol McGiffin, Louie Spence, Mario Falcone and Vicky Entwistle. That October, Stodden appeared in a photo op for PETA, which depicted her wearing a lettuce bikini to promote vegetarianism. On March 18, 2014, the video for 50 Cent's "Don't Worry Bout It" was released, featuring a cameo appearance by Stodden. That August, Stodden appeared in an episode of the Reelz reality television series Hollywood Hillbillies.

=== 2015–present ===
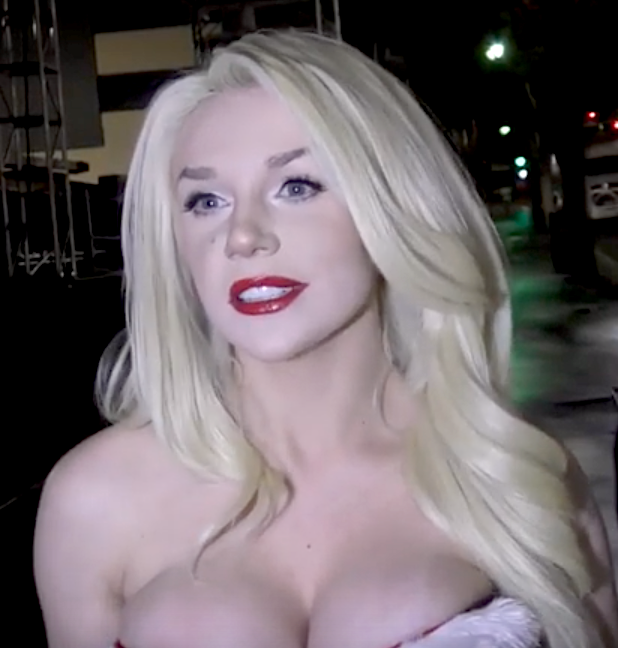
Stodden in 2016

On May 14, 2015, Vivid Entertainment released a solo sex tape created by Stodden. Stodden stated that she would donate what she was paid to charity. On August 19, 2015, Rich Kid Mafia (RKM), a Los Angeles-based entertainment company whose primary services include artist management, digital marketing and music production, signed Stodden to an exclusive international management and development deal. In March 2016, Stodden appeared alongside her mother in the pilot episode of Lifetime series The Mother/Daughter Experiment: Celebrity Edition. The same year, Stodden made her feature film debut in the independent film Love Addict.

In 2019, Stodden signed a deal with FNL Network to star in a self-titled reality show created by director Rocco Leo Gaglioti. In March 2020, Stodden finalized her divorce with Hutchison. Stodden spent her time during the COVID-19 pandemic working on a memoir, recording a new album, starting a cosmetics line, and running an OnlyFans account. In 2023, Stodden ceased producing content for OnlyFans, focusing instead more and more on animal rights advocacy and activism against child marriage.

In May 2021, Stodden said that in 2011 television personality Chrissy Teigen tweeted and privately messaged her urging her to kill herself. Teigen subsequently apologized to Stodden, saying she was sad and mortified at her past self, whom she described as "an insecure, attention seeking troll." Stodden accepted her apology but deemed it an attempt to save Teigen's business partnerships. A month later, Teigen released another apology in a lengthy blog post admitting to cyberbullying.

On July 21, 2026, Jason Alexander, of Seinfeld fame, apologized to Courtney Stodden for a controversial 2012 Funny or Die skit that he wrote and starred in, according to TMZ. The star told the outlet, "Looking back at the comedy sketch in which Ms. Stodden and I participated in 2012, I completely agree that it was inappropriate, and I truly regret it. [...] But more importantly, I am deeply sorry for any harm or distress it has caused Ms. Stodden. I offer her my sincerest apologies." Alexander's apology came after Stodden posted about the incident on Instagram. During the sketch, Alexander repeatedly rubbed a cell phone across her chest while joking there was "no signal" in her head but "plenty of signal" in her chest and joked about taking her "behind the couch" and "having his way" with her once she turned 18. She was 17 and he was 52 at the time. On July 23, 2026, Stodden responded to Alexander's apology by stating to the news outlet Variety that she was pleasantly surprised that Alexander took responsibility for his role in the disturbing sketch but could take it a step further. "I'm very taken aback that an adult was actually able to take accountability because I haven't heard a lot of adults take accountability," Stodden explains. "When I first got word that he publicly apologized I was grateful because I think that's the first step in change. At the same time, I think it would be even better if he put that into action, so I would urge Jason Alexander to support AB 1267 and support what's happening in California or even donate to Unchained at Last." AB 1267 is a bill that would effectively ban child marriage by making the legal minimum age to wed 18 years old.

== Personal life ==
Stodden is a vegetarian, explaining that she "never felt right eating animals before". Another reason for her vegetarianism was thought to be lactose intolerance, as Stodden explained in a Couples Therapy bonus clip. In 2014, it was further clarified that she was not lactose intolerant, and empathy for animals was the sole reason for her vegetarianism. Stodden had attempted to follow a vegan diet, but chose instead to follow a vegetarian diet due to fewer food restrictions. Stodden has promoted the vegetarian lifestyle on PETA's behalf.

Stodden has said in interviews that she identifies as a Christian. She commented: "I am a Christian girl. It may come as a surprise to some people that I support gay marriage. I believe wholeheartedly in 'Do not judge others.' Let people live their lives and be happy. That's what the bible teaches—love one another." Stodden has also said she is bisexual.

In June 2013, Stodden had breast augmentation surgery to increase her breast size from a size C to a size DD. By March 2022, she had the implants removed, telling Newsweek that she did so due to back pain.

In April 2021, Stodden publicly came out as non-binary and announced the decision to change her gender pronouns to they/them. She later updated her pronouns to she/they in June 2022.

=== Relationships ===
At age 16, Stodden (Note: Although this ABC News story and this Us Weekly story both refer to Stodden as an aspiring country music singer, Stodden explicitly states at the 2:26 mark of the first video in this Wow Report story that she is not a country singer.) signed up on the Internet for an acting workshop taught by actor Doug Hutchison, on the recommendation of a friend of her maternal aunt, who worked in Hollywood, and knew Hutchison. Hutchison, who was not aware that Stodden was a minor, began a courtship with her over the Internet that lasted between four and six months. (Note: The ABC News citation indicates that the courtship was four months. However, the interview between Dr. Jenn Berman and Stodden's mother, Krista, that occurred in Couples Therapy Episode 2.8 indicated that it was five or six.) After Hutchison became aware of Stodden's age, he told her mother, Krista, who had monitored her online exchanges, and was aware of her relationship and the age difference, that he would cease his relationship with Stodden if her parents disapproved. Her parents, citing Stodden's "devout Christianity", allowed her to make her own decision.

On May 20, 2011, Stodden married Hutchison in Las Vegas, Nevada. Stodden was his third wife. Their relationship drew controversy and criticism, as Stodden was 16 when she married 50-year-old Hutchison, who had been labeled a "pedophile" and "predator". It was also reported that Stodden's father was four years younger than his son-in-law Hutchison. According to Hutchison, as a result of his marriage to Stodden, his agent quit, his family disowned him and he received death threats.

On November 1, 2013, the media reported that Stodden and Hutchison were ending their marriage of two and a half years. Stodden later told Fox News that their 34-year age gap was a primary contributing factor for their divorce. In August 2014, the couple announced that they had reconciled, with plans to renew their wedding vows later that year.

It was announced on May 17, 2016, that Stodden and Hutchison were expecting their first child. In July, around three months into her pregnancy, Stodden announced she had suffered a miscarriage. On May 20, the pair celebrated their fifth anniversary by renewing their wedding vows.

In January 2017, it was reported that Stodden and Hutchison had separated, but were still living together. In March 2018, Stodden filed for divorce and did not request spousal support. Their divorce was finalized in March 2020 as Stodden announced on her Instagram, stating that she felt "absolutely taken advantage of" and "groomed", which she stated began when he reached out to her via email. Stodden made this accusation in a March 2022 interview, along with the statement that Hutchison was emotionally abusive and at times physically abusive, commenting, "I think that's the ultimate power a groomer has over a child. That emotional abuse and control." Hutchison denied the allegations. He also stated in an interview back in 2011 that Stodden contacted him via email first under her mother's supervision, as confirmed by Courtney herself back then.

On May 28, 2021, Stodden got engaged to her partner, entrepreneur Chris Sheng. In July 2023, Stodden announced the engagement had ended.

In August 2023, Courtney Stodden began dating film director and producer Jared Safier. They married on December 3, 2024.

== Filmography ==
=== Television ===
Year	Title	Notes
2012	Couples Therapy	12 episodes
2012	Lifechangers	1 episode
2012	The Donny Clay Show with Courtney Stodden	
2013	Tosh.0	Episode: "DJ Decimal Point"
2013	Celebrity Big Brother	24 episodes
2013–2015	Big Brother's Bit on the Side	21 episodes
2014	POP, Fashion & Sport	Episode: "The Oceans Are Dying (Premiere Awareness Event in Hollywood)"
2014	Hollywood Hillbillies	Episode: "Michael Makes a Music Video"
2015	Reality Ex-Wives	
2016	The Mother/Daughter Experiment: Celebrity Edition	
2016	Million Dollar Matchmaker	
2017	Celebs Go Dating	Series 3
2017	Dr. Phil	1 episode
2017	Gown and Out in Beverly Hills	2 episodes
2019	Courtney	11 episodes, Exclusive Produced by Rocco Leo Gaglioti & Courtney Stodden

=== Film ===
Year	Title	Role	Notes
2016	Love Addict	Mrs. Davenport	Feature Film Debut
2019	Verotika	Pretty Blonde	"Change of Face" segment
2025	I Was a Child Bride: The Courtney Stodden Story	Herself/Narrator	

=== Music videos ===
- "Car Candy" (2010)
- "Don't Put It on Me" (2010)
- "Reality" (2012)
- "Mistletoe Bikini" (2016)
- "Glass of Wine" (2017) (Us Weekly exclusive)
- "For You" (2018) (credited as Ember)

== Discography ==
=== Singles ===
- "Car Candy" (2010)
- "Don't Put It On Me" (2010)
- "Reality" (2012)
- "Asphalt" (2016)
- "Mistletoe Bikini" (2016)
- "Orange Juice and Pink Pills" (2018)
- "Sixteen" (2018) (credited as Ember)
- "Me Too" (2018) (credited as Ember)
- "Pink Flamingo" (2018) (credited as Ember)
- "For You" (2018) (credited as Ember)
- "Daddy Issues" (2018)
- "Hot 'n Juicy" (2019)
- "Freak Alert" (2019)
- "Side Effects" (2020)
- "Butterfly" (2020)
- "Pleasure" (2021)

=== Albums ===
- Off the Record (2018) (credited as Ember)
