= Rocco Leo Gaglioti =

American television director

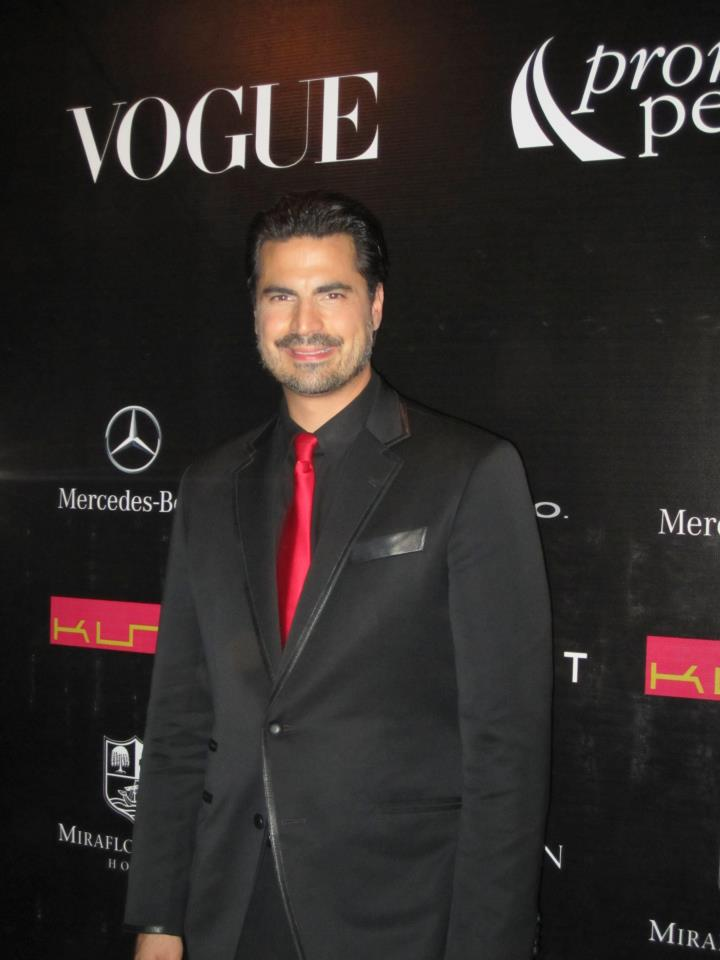
- Born: 1977 (age 48–49); Winter Park, Florida, U.S.
- Occupations: Television director, writer, producer, host, and actor

Rocco Leo Gaglioti is an American actor, television director, writer, producer, host, and businessman. He is best known for creating television series Courtney, Carol Alt's Living Room, and Fashion News Live.

== Career ==
Rocco is the founder of the television network FNL Network. In 2018, he created the TV show, The Wishwall, starring Simonetta Lein. His documentary, Inside Amato, won Best Documentary at the Bokeh South Africa International Fashion Film Festival in 2017. He created the reality show, Courtney, about Courtney Stodden life story in 2019. He is a member of the Producers Guild of America.

== Filmography ==
Year	Title	Actor	Writer	Director	Producer	Note
2004	Fashion News Live		✓	✓	✓	661 Episodes
2010	Fashion News Live in ASL		✓	✓	✓	6 Episodes
2010	Runways			✓	✓	26 Episodes
2011	Grumbacher Spotlight Artist Series			✓	✓	13 Episodes
2011	VidBlogger Nation			✓	✓	36 Episodes
2012	Miss Deaf International			✓	✓	Documentary
2013	FNL's Celebrity Beauty Secrets			✓	✓	14 Episodes
2013-2014	FNL's Fashion Tips			✓	✓	13 Episodes
2013-2014	FNL's Fashion Able			✓	✓	26 Episodes
2013-2014	Flashback Friday			✓	✓	13 Episodes
2013-2014	FNL's Model Monday			✓	✓	13 Episodes
2015	Inside Amato			✓	✓	Documentary short
2015	FashionAble			✓	✓	7 Episodes
2015	IndestruXtible			✓	✓	Short film
2015	Backstage Pass			✓	✓	TV documentary
2016	Beauty Tips		✓	✓	✓	2 Episodes
2016	A Mini Movie		✓		✓	Short film
2017	Model Monday		✓	✓	✓	8 Episode
2017	Street Style		✓	✓	✓	15 Episode
2017	City Showcase		✓	✓	✓	8 Episodes
2017	Danu			✓	✓	Short film
2017	Model Diaries		✓	✓	✓	6 Episodes
2017	Film Corner				✓	26 Episodes
2017	Fashion and Culture in Los Angeles				✓	Documentary
2018	Entertainment and Fashion clips		✓	✓	✓	15 Episodes
2016-2018	FNL Vintage			✓	✓	60 Episodes
2019	The Bird’s Eye View			✓	✓	10 Episodes
2019	Carol Alt's Living Room		✓	✓	✓	13 Episodes
2019	Courtney		✓	✓	✓	11 Episodes
2020	International Digital Fashion Week				✓	105 Episodes
