= Cordill =

Cordill is a surname. Notable people with the surname include:

- Charles C. Cordill (1845–1916), American cotton planter and politician
- Olie Cordill (1916–1988), American football player

== See also ==
- Cogdill
