= S. C. Megale =

American novelist and screenwriter (born 1995)

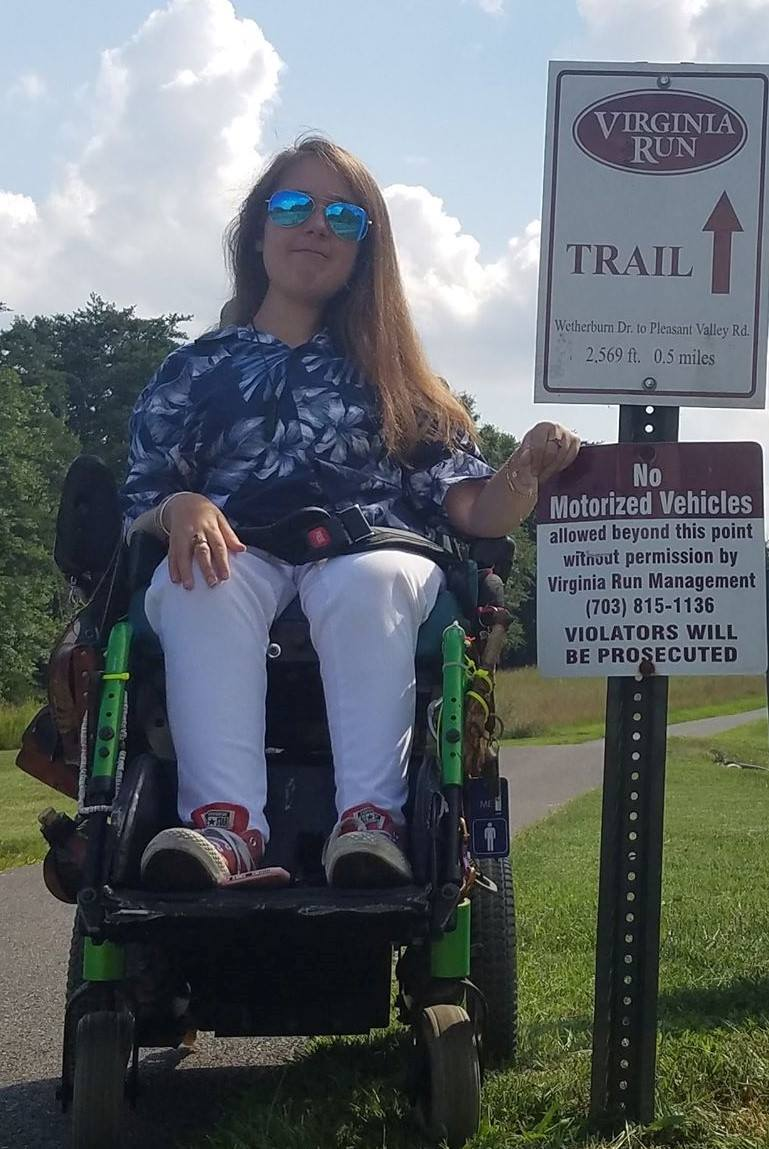
- Born: Shea Coline Megale; June 13, 1995 (age 31); Virginia, United States
- Occupations: Novelist; Screenwriter
- Years active: 2007–Present

S. C. Megale (born Shea Coline Megale; June 13, 1995) is an American novelist and screenwriter, who frequently works in the young adult fiction, science fiction, and fantasy genres. She is best known for the novel This Is Not a Love Scene.

== Early life ==
Born in Virginia to mother Megan and father Lawrence, Megale grew up in the Washington, D.C. area, the youngest of three children. Diagnosed at 18 months with spinal muscular atrophy, she is determined to live life on her own terms, and set out to launch a writing career at an early age.

== Career ==
In 2007, the then-12-year-old Megale authored Marvelous Mercer, a children's book detailing fictionalized adventures with her real-life service dog, Mercer. That book was followed up with Marvelous Mercer: The Secret Project (2008) and Marvelous Mercer: All Paws on Deck (2009).

On September 26, 2007, Megale was the subject of a USA Today article. On September 27, she appeared on NBC's Today Show, where she was interviewed by Meredith Vieira. On October 22, Megale was featured in an article in The Washington Post, written by Amy Orndorff. On March 28, 2008, she appeared on the CBS Evening News, talking to reporter Richard Schlesinger in a segment introduced by Katie Couric.

As she entered her teens, Megale became increasingly interested in the young adult fiction, science fiction, and fantasy genres, and soon developed a reputation as a prolific writer, cranking out such novels as The Breakers series, The Brotherhood series, the Emporium series, Overboard, The Wall Between Us, and Starborn.

On April 12, 2010, Megale presided over the ceremonial opening bell ringing at the NASDAQ MarketSite in Times Square. On May 7, 2010, she hosted an all-star boxing event to support her charity—The Shea Coline Megale Trust—at Oheka Castle in Huntington, New York. Dubbed Hassle at the Castle, the show featured appearances by such boxing legends as Evander Holyfield, Gerry Cooney, Tyrell Biggs, Pernell Whitaker, and Lou Duva, as well as the divorced parents of Lindsay Lohan—Michael and Dina—whose presence at the gathering resulted in a tense confrontation between the embattled former spouses.

On November 17, 2014, Megale attended the premiere of The Hunger Games: Mockingjay – Part 1 at the Nokia Theatre in Los Angeles, California. That same year, she penned a paranormal romantic feature film script entitled Guardian.

In 2015, it was announced that motion picture production company Lost Colony Entertainment had optioned her novel Starborn, with filmmaker Richard O'Sullivan handling the screenplay adaptation.

On May 15, 2015, Megale appeared on WCBS-TV in New York, interviewed by reporter Carolyn Gusoff about her work with Canine Companions for Independence (CCI). That same day, she gave a speech at a CCI event in Medford, New York., and was also featured in the May 15, 2007 edition of Newsday, discussing her work with CCI.

On October 23, 2018, it was announced by St. Martin's Press/Wednesday Books that her Young Adult romance novel, This Is Not a Love Scene, would be released on May 7, 2019.

== Personal life ==
An advocate for people living with disabilities, Meagle founded the Shea Coline Megale Trust, a nonprofit geared towards fighting SMA and helping those who live with the disease. A progressive, she spends much of her time working with children, and with dogs used as service animals, such as Canine Companions for Independence. Shea is also an active member of the Clifton Lions Club, a community service organization in Clifton, Virginia. She served as the club president in 2026–2027.
