= Dan Lashley =

American actor and filmmaker (born 1977)

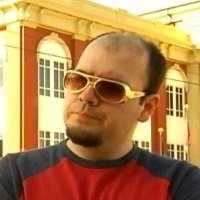
- Born: Bowling Green, KY, U.S.
- Occupations: Screenwriter, Film director, Film producer, Actor
- Years active: 2002-Present

Dan Lashley is an independent film director, writer, and actor from Bowling Green, Kentucky, United States.

== Films ==
=== Released ===
In April 2004, Lashley began work on a low-budget independent comedy about a group of employees in a rock & roll radio station, called Communication Breakdown (written by Lashley and Richard O'Sullivan). It was his first starring role in a feature film. Principal photography took place at the studios of Blue Ridge Motion Pictures in Asheville, North Carolina, with production wrapping in early May of that same year. Upon completion, the film received a limited release.

In 2009, Lashley made his directorial debut, helming an independent film entitled Rose Colored Miles which featured former WWE European Champion, Al Snow, Lashley himself, and musician Michael Sandefer (known professionally as Michael Epic).

=== In development ===
On November 3, 2009, it was announced that a romantic comedy script written by Lashley and his Communication Breakdown co-writer Richard O'Sullivan, entitled One Night With You, was being developed for the big screen in association with Scott M. Rosenfelt, producer of such films as Home Alone (1990), Mystic Pizza (1988) and Teen Wolf Too (1987). On November 19, 2009, it was reported that Lindsay Lohan, who at the time was in the midst of mounting legal problems centered on drug and alcohol problems, was in talks to play the lead role in One Night With You. On April 27, 2010, O'Sullivan confirmed the rumors, telling WENN, "It is ready-made for Lindsay. If it happens, it could be her Mickey Rourke comeback. But we're proceeding with extreme caution while the Lohan family sorts through their issues during a very trying time." Despite the backing of Carsten H.W. Lorenz—producer of Harold & Kumar Go to White Castle (2004), Harold & Kumar Escape from Guantanamo Bay (2008), The Grudge (2004), and Independence Day: Resurgence (2016)—it soon became apparent that Lohan, due to her continued legal woes, could not be insured for the film. Rumors then began to swirl that singer Taylor Swift would either replace Lohan in the project or join her in a supporting role, with Penn Badgley taking on the role of the lead character's love interest. On October 30, 2010, O'Sullivan lambasted the media in an interview with Radar Online, claiming that Lohan was the victim of a double standard. He compared her troubles to those of Charlie Sheen and implied that the media and the public were far more forgiving of Sheen than Lohan. After Lohan was forced back into court due to a parole violation in early 2011, O'Sullivan seemed to abandon the plan of proceeding with the beleaguered actress, telling reporters, "We're screwed."

In 2015, it was announced that Lashley would direct a darkly comedic horror film entitled Intermission of the Damned.
