= Hollywood Hillbillies =

American reality television show

- Genre: Reality television
- Developed by: Mike Pack
- Starring: Michael Kittrell; Delores Hughes
- Country of origin: United States
- Original language: English
- No. of seasons: 3
- No. of episodes: 31

Production
- Executive producers: Rebekah Fry; Jonathan Koch; Malachi McGlone; Steven Michaels; Ryann Lauckner
- Producer: Rich Goodman
- Production company: Asylum Entertainment

Original release
- Network: Reelz
- Release: January 21, 2014 – July 11, 2015

Hollywood Hillbillies is an American reality television show (in the fly on the wall style), starring Michael Tyler Kittrell (also known for his YouTube channel, CopperCab) and aired on Reelz.

== Cast ==
- Michael Tyler Kittrell as himself
- Delores Hughes as herself
- Dee Dee Peters as herself
- John Cox as himself
- Paul Conlon as himself
- David Weintraub as himself
