= Couples Therapy (2012 TV series) =

2012 American reality television series

- Genre: Reality
- Starring: Dr. Jenn Mann; Dr. Mike Dow; Sarah Michael Novia; Gabrielle Moore; Keisha Downey
- Country of origin: United States
- Original language: English
- No. of seasons: 6
- No. of episodes: 58 (list of episodes)

Production
- Executive producers: Damian Sullivan; Jill Holmes; Joel Rodgers; John Irwin; Laurel Stier; Rob Buchta; Sudi Khosropur; Susan Levison
- Running time: 42 minutes
- Production company: Irwin Entertainment

Original release
- Network: VH1
- Release: March 21, 2012 – December 9, 2015

Related
- Family Therapy with Dr. Jenn

Couples Therapy is an American reality television show airing on the cable network VH1 that chronicles reality television performers as they receive relationship counseling from psychotherapist Dr. Jenn Mann and her staff. The first season, which consists of eight episodes, premiered March 21, 2012 and featured participants such as rapper DMX and Linda Hogan (ex-wife of wrestler Hulk Hogan). The second season premiered on October 3, 2012, and features Doug Hutchison and his wife, Courtney Stodden. VH1 renewed the show for a sixth season, which premiered October 7, 2015.

== Episodes ==
Season	Episodes	Originally released	
Season	Episodes	First released	Last released
1	8	March 21, 2012	May 9, 2012
2	10	October 3, 2012	November 28, 2012
3	10	June 12, 2013	August 21, 2013
4	10	January 2, 2014	March 6, 2014
5	10	September 10, 2014	November 12, 2014
Specials	2	September 3, 2014	September 10, 2014
6	10	October 7, 2015	December 9, 2015

== Cast ==
=== Main cast ===
- Dr. Jenn – Dr. Jenn Mann has been a Beverly Hills Marriage, Family, and Child Therapist in private practice for more than twenty years, and is an expert in relationship issues, sex therapy, substance abuse, eating disorders, depression and anxiety. She has appeared on numerous TV shows such as The Oprah Winfrey Show, is a regular on The Today Show, The Early Show, and CNN, and hosts a nightly call-in advice radio show on SiriusXM. She is also a best-selling author, and an award-winning columnist for several magazines.
- Dr. Mike Dow – Dow is Mann's Head Counselor. Described by VH1 as "Dr. Jenn's right-hand man", Dr. Mike Dow is a psychotherapist, author, and relationship expert, and the Clinical Director of Therapeutic and Behavioral Services at The Body Well Integrative Medical Center in Los Angeles. He appears regularly on The Dr. Oz Show, Anderson Cooper 360°, and The Rachael Ray Show.
- Sarah Michael Novia – Sarah Michael Novia, LPC, DCC a residential treatment counselor at the Couples Center, has a private online psychotherapy practice in New Canaan, CT, specializing in discreet solution-focused brief therapy. She often appears as a psychological expert for television/talk/radio shows and she has a long history of working with those struggling with relationship issues, including many actors, musicians and athletes.
- Gabrielle Moore – Gabrielle Moore, M.A., a residential treatment counselor at the Couples Center, is in the last year of her Couple & Family Therapy Doctoral program, and is currently an intern at a nonprofit agency in Los Angeles, CA. Her practice focuses on treating a wide variety of couples and couple issues, as well as individuals with problematic romantic and interpersonal relationships.
- Keisha Downy – Keisha Downey, Ed.D., MFTI, a residential treatment counselor at the Couples Center, has a private psychotherapy practice in Beverly Hills, CA, where she specializes in working with adults, couples, families, and teenagers. She recently obtained her Doctorate with a concentration in Counseling Psychology and has years of experience helping individuals regain their self-identity.
- Rachel Clark – Rachel Clark was a residential treatment counselor for the first two seasons at the Couples Center and a licensed Marriage and Family Therapist. She also runs a private practice in the Orange County and Los Angeles area, and is a motivational speaker.
- Tom Carouso – Thomas Carouso, MFT, was a residential treatment counselor for the first two seasons at the Couples Center, and has a private psychotherapy practice in Redondo Beach and Beverly Hills, where he has been working for more than a decade. He is also a professor in the Master's Program in Psychology at Cal State University Dominguez Hills.

=== Couples ===
==== Season 1 ====
- Angelina Pivarnick and Chris Nirschel – Angelina Pivarnick first gained fame on the reality TV series Jersey Shore, while Nirschel is a chef whose behavior got him voted off of Season 7 of The Next Food Network Star. Pivarnick has difficulty trusting men after suffering painful past relationships, which is fueled by Nirschel's self-described history as a womanizer. Together for only two months, they are constantly fighting, and hope that therapy can explain why their relationship soured so quickly.
- DMX and Tashera Simmons – DMX was a multi-platinum rapper and actor, and Simons was his childhood sweetheart, wife of fourteen years and mother of his four children. Although they still say they are best friends, their marriage has been threatened by DMX's uncontrolled infidelity, which has resulted in more than a half a dozen children out of wedlock. Separated for more than six years, they are seeking couples treatment to see if they can mend their broken marriage or end it.
- Vienna Girardi and Kasey Kahl – Girardi and Kahl gained fame as the Season 14 winner of The Bachelor, and a contestant in Season 6 of The Bachelorette, respectively. Though the relationship they each began with others on those shows ended, they fell in love upon meeting one another. However, Kahl's fear of betrayal and Girardi's tempestuous relationship history damaged their relationship. They broke up several months prior to appearing on Couples Therapy, though they claim to still be very much in love, and hope that therapy will give their relationship a second chance.
- Linda Hogan and Charlie Hill – Fifty-two-year-old Hogan is still recovering from her public divorce from professional wrestler Hulk Hogan. Although she receives support from 23-year-old Hill, their 29-year age difference is an unresolved issue that continues to adversely affect their relationship. Hogan announced on May 15, 2012 (six days after the airing of the season 1 finale) that she and Hill had broken up.
- Reichen Lehmkuhl and Rodiney Santiago – Lehmkuhl gained fame as the Season 4 winner of The Amazing Race. His relationship with his model ex-boyfriend, Santiago, ended while appeared together on the Logo reality TV series The A-List: New York together. They are enrolling in therapy to give their relationship another chance, and as a public gay couple, face having to overcome stereotypes.

==== Season 2 ====
- Todd "Too Short" Shaw and Monica Payne – Shaw is a rapper, producer, and actor known for hit songs like 2006's "Blow The Whistle". He met Payne in 2005, and although they dated exclusively for a while, she ended the relationship after he refused to give up his partying lifestyle. They have remained friends over the years, and have wondered what could have been. Shaw asked Payne to come to therapy in hopes of getting a second chance at winning her heart, but she is still very hurt by their breakup, and unsure if she can ever trust him again.
- Joel "JoJo" Hailey and Tashaunda "Tiny" Hailey – JoJo is an R&B singer from the groups Jodeci and K-Ci And JoJo, whose most popular song, "All My Life" topped the charts in 1997. JoJo was living the fast life of a famous R&B singer indulging in money, women, and alcohol, until he met Tiny.
- Alex McCord and Simon van Kempen – Life for this couple and their two children was transformed when McCord and van Kempen were cast on the reality TV series The Real Housewives of New York City in 2008. Whereas before they lived a normal life, the airing of the formerly private aspects of their personal lives on television had deleterious effects on their marriage. They were not invited back to the show after the fourth season, and resuming their normal lives and careers has proven difficult, and their relationship is marked by constant bickering and verbal cruelty.
- Nik Richie and Shayne Lamas – Lamas is the daughter of actor Lorenzo Lamas and the winner of the twelfth season of The Bachelor, and Richie is the creator of the tabloid website TheDirty. They married in Las Vegas eight hours after they met, and each had no idea who the other was until tabloids reported on their wedding in the morning. Lamas was appalled to discover that Richie was the man behind a website she considers offensive to women, which caused tension in their marriage. While the first year of their relationship was "passionate, spontaneous, and adventurous", it worsened when Lamas became pregnant with their daughter a little more than a year after they wed, and issues at the heart of current conflict include Richie's website, Lamas' spending habits and the challenges of parenthood.
- Courtney Stodden and Doug Hutchison – Hutchison and Stodden hired a publicist to promote that the then-51-year-old actor married the then-16-year-old Stodden in 2011. More publicity to promote Stodden's manner of dress and the Internet videos that she released followed. They enrolled in therapy in order to resolve issues that arise in their marriage from their age difference, such as the revealing clothing Stodden tends to wear. In the season premiere, they come into conflict with the others over their age difference, the fact that Stodden still has two weeks before turning 18, and her manner of dress. Lamas in particular criticizes Stodden upon her arrival, while Richie gets into heated exchanges with Hutchison over Richie's characterization of Stodden as "trash".

==== Season 3 ====
- Joe Francis and Abbey Wilson
- Flavor Flav and Liz Trujillo
- Chingy Bailey and Temple Poteat
- Dustin Zito and Heather Marter
- Catelynn Lowell and Tyler Baltierra

==== Season 4 ====
- Taylor Armstrong and John Bluher
- Farrah Abraham
- Ghostface Killah and Kelsey Nykole
- Whitney Mixter and Sada Bettencourt
- Jon Gosselin and Liz Janetta

==== Season 5 ====
- Jenna Jameson and John Wood
- Dick Donato and Stephanie Rogness-Fischer
- Anthony "Treach" Criss and Cicely Evans
- Deena Cortese and Chris Buckner
- Juan Pablo Galavis and Nikki Ferrell

==== Season 6 ====
- Angela "Big Ang" Raiola and Neil Murphy
- Joe Budden and Kaylin Garcia
- Janice Dickinson and Dr. Robert “Rocky” Gerner
- Scott Stapp and Jaclyn Stapp
- Carmen Carrera and Adrian Torres

== Production history ==
Season 2 saw the casting of actor Doug Hutchison and his wife, Courtney Stodden, whom he married when she was 16, and who was two weeks shy of her 18th birthday upon their arrival at the therapy center. Due to Stodden's age, she was forced to leave the production area every night, due to California child labor laws. This drew surprise from one participant in the series, who commented, "It was totally bizarre. The whole point of the show was to have all these couples living together in the house. Courtney had to leave Doug every night and go to a hotel so that no labor laws were broken." This also caused conflict with other participants, one of whom commented, "It caused a lot of friction in the house and poor Doug was left by himself a lot of the time when everyone else was a couple. How can you shoot a show called 'Couples Therapy' when one couple don’t even share a bedroom together?"

Despite characterizations of Hutchison as a "pedophile" and "predator", the series' main therapist, Dr. Mann, stressed that she does not believe that Hutchison is, or was, seeking out young people, saying, "He's not a predator. He’s not someone, who if Courtney left him, would be trolling the Internet or high schools for underage girls. That's not his m.o. This is not a guy who was seeking out teenagers. He was teaching a class, she wanted to be an actress, it was an acting class... And that’s how it started." Though Mann was eventually surprised by the dynamic between the two, she commented on her initial hesitations about working with the couple, saying, "I believe it was the wrong decision to let a 16-year-old marry a man in his 50s. It’s uncomfortable to see... [at first] I said to my producer, ‘I think this [guy] is a pedophile...I don’t know if I can work with these people.’ I don’t condone it, but I do see that this is a married couple that is genuinely married and they have marital issues that needed to be worked on. I came in saying, 'She’s a victim, he’s a predator.' What I found out was that she has a lot more power in this relationship and he is far more powerless than I expected. His family has completely disowned him... He unfortunately has nothing besides her." Hutchison was also defended by Stodden's mother, Krista Keller, who praised Hutchison for the kindness with which he treats Stodden.

== Spin-off ==
- Family Therapy with Dr. Jenn
