= Anjelika Kour =

- Born: Barnaul, Siberia
- Citizenship: American
- Education: University of Toronto, University of Hong Kong, Universidad San Francisco de Quito, University of Siena
- Height: 5 ft 8 in (173 cm)
- Parents: Vladimir Kour (father); Alla Kour (mother)

Anjelika Kour is a Siberian-American entrepreneur and managing director of an NYC design agency DigitalDesign.NYC.

== Early life ==
Born to Alla and Vladimir Kour (son of the late chess champion & grandmaster Ruvim Kour).

She was raised in Barnaul, Russia. After modeling for over 10 years with many brands, namely L’Oreal, KMS, Redken, Toni & Guy - she proceeded to build a career in design and technology.

== Career ==
Anjelika Kour was the first hire at Harri.com, New York City's largest hospitality recruitment platform. In 2014, Kour founded a fashion platform Brick & Portal in New York City. A year later, she founded a SoHo design agency DigitalDesign.NYC in 2015, a full-service web and app design and development agency/incubator with a notable mobile & web app portfolio, including: Snailz, RAPID Business Cards, Glam + Go, Squrl, UMMA Bot, and most recently @globalnewyorker.

In 2021, DigitalDesign.NYC was ranked in the Top 40 of Women-Owned Design Businesses globally by Clutch, in the 2nd place.

In 2022, DigitalDesign.NYC won several international design awards, notably honors for Chef Antoine Lours website.

In 2023, DigitalDesign.NYC launched a new branding division DD.NYC® focusing on high-caliber creative with a focus in consumer and corporate branding, award-winning web design, and packaging.

In 2023, DD.NYC® was awarded an Anthem Award from IADAS' 2nd Annual Anthem Awards and nominated for a Webby Award for the Ms. Foundation 50th Anniversary Women of Vision Gala website.

In 2024, DD.NYC® received a Pentawards Silver Award at the annual Pentawards Gala in London for packaging design. That same year, the agency won Gold at the Anthem Awards for its WillowWood rebrand.

In 2025, DD.NYC® collaborated with the FIFA World Cup 2026 to design and launch the official New York/New Jersey host city website. That year, the agency was also listed on the Inc. 5000 ranking of America’s fastest-growing private companies, placing #58 in Advertising, Marketing & PR and #71 among New York companies.

== Sources ==
- Lein, Simonetta (19 May 2017). "Be A Girl Boss Entrepreneur. The Celebrity Wishmaker Simonetta Lein Meets Brick & Portal Founder Anjelika Kour". Huffingtonpost.com.
- Tan, Yanni (25 November 2015). "Create Your Own Online Retail Store Without Inventory". Ladyboss.asia.
- "Ammunition For the Modern Businesswoman - Versatile Fashion". Jiacollection.com. Jia Collection.
- "Where is June? + Brick & Portal". Whereisjune.com. Where Is June. December 2015.
- Hanna, Holly Reisem. "5 Ways to Start an Online Fashion Boutique for Free". Theworkathomewomen.com.
- Wong, Jamie (10 January 2016). "Brick & Portal: Interview with Anjelika Kour". lifeaccordingtojamie.com. Wordpress.
- информатизации, Управление. "21 января состоялась очередная встреча в рамках развития подготовки IT-специалистов в АлтГУ". Asu.ru.
