= Communication Breakdown (film) =

- Directed by: Richard O'Sullivan
- Written by: Dan Lashley; Richard O'Sullivan
- Produced by: John Edmonds Kozma; Fred Hueston; John Michael Burgess
- Starring: Dan Lashley; William V. Repoley; Aleks West; Brian Heffron; Jasmin St. Claire
- Release date: 2004
- Country: United States
- Language: English

Communication Breakdown is a 2004 independent motion picture directed by Richard O'Sullivan, who also wrote the script along with the film's star, Dan Lashley, and produced by John Edmonds Kozma (producer of Nick Cassavetes' Kentucky Rhapsody").

The movie also stars Willie Repoley, Meredith Sause, Aleks West, Blair Peery, Brian Heffron, Jasmin St. Claire, Katie Lester, Satu Rautaharju, and Aubrey Goss.
