= FNL Network =

American television network

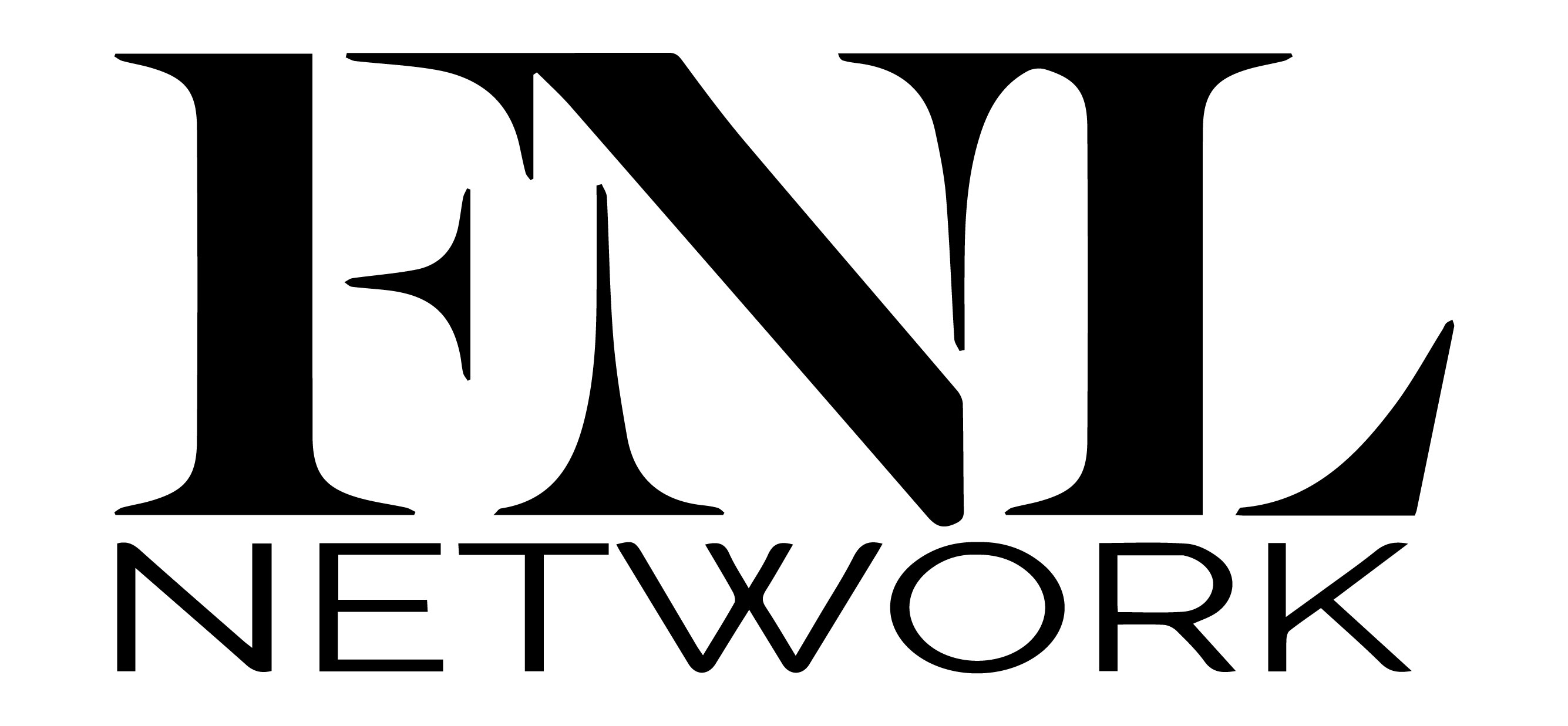
- Type: Television network
- Country: United States
- Availability: Worldwide via television and apps
- Motto: The Best of the Best
- Launch date: August 2015
- Picture format: 1080 (HDTV)
- Official website: http://www.FNLNetwork.com
- Language: English

FNL Network (Fashion News Lifestyle Network) is an American television network founded by Rocco Leo Gaglioti in 2015 and based in Los Angeles, California. It is available on a variety of devices including Amazon Fire TV, Apple TV, Roku, and all Android and Apple iOS devices. Its signature program, Fashion News Live, goes backstage at all the major fashion weeks around the globe. Past co-hosts include Brana Dane and Carmen Carerra.

== Programming ==
FNL Network offers a combination of fashion, film, travel, beauty, health and reality TV.

=== List of original programs ===
- A Shaded View on Fashion Film
- Beauty Tips
- Carol Alt's Living Room
- City Showcase
- Courtney
- Entertainment and Fashion Clips
- Fashion News Live
- FNL Vintage
- Film Corner
- Flashback Friday
- International Digital Fashion Week (IDFW)
- Behind the Scenes of Fashion News Live
- IndestruXtable
- Inside Amato
- Fashion News Live in ASL
- Miss and Mister Deaf International
- Model Diaries
- Model Monday
- Street Style
- The Bird's Eye View
- Ask Rocco
- The Wishwall
- 13th A Shaded View on Fashion Film (ASVOFF)
