= Kay Hooper =

American novelist

- Born: 1957 (age 68–69); Merced County, California, U.S.
- Died: October 4, 2026
- Education: East Rutherford High School (Bostic, North Carolina); Isothermal Community College (Spindale, North Carolina)
- Occupation: Novelist
- Writing career
- Period: 1980–present
- Genres: romance, suspense
- Website: www.kayhooper.com

Kay Hooper (born 1957) was a New York Times bestselling American author of more than 60 books.

== Biography ==
Kay Hooper was born in Merced County, California to Martha and James Hooper. Her father, an Air Force employee, was stationed in the base hospital. James, Martha (1938-2002), and Kay lived on the base. Shortly after Kay's birth, the family moved back to North Carolina where she was raised and went to school. Her two younger siblings were born in North Carolina.

Kay Hooper lives in Rutherford County, North Carolina, near her father and her siblings. She fosters cats and kittens for the Community Pet Center, a non-profit rescue organization on whose board she also sits.

Her first book, entitled The Lady Thief, was published in 1981 and she has since gone on to publish over 70 books. She made the New York Times Best Sellers List in 2000 with her book Stealing Shadows and was nominated for the Shamus Award for Best Original P.I. Paperback for House of Cards, part of The Bishop Series, in 1992.

Kay Hooper died on October 4, 2026 (aged 68). Her family announced her passing via Hoopers facebook account.

== Selected works ==
=== The Quinn/Thief series ===
1. Once a Thief. October 2002. ISBN 978-0-553-58511-7.
2. Always a Thief. November 2002. ISBN 978-0-553-58568-1.

=== The Men of Mysteries Past series ===
1. All for Quinn / August 1993
2. The Trouble with Jared / June 1993
3. Hunting the Wolfe / April 1993
4. The Touch of Max / February 1993

=== The Once Upon a Time series ===
1. The Matchmaker / October 1991
2. Star-Crossed Lovers / October 1990
3. The Lady and the Lion / September 1990
4. Through the Looking Glass / June 1990
5. What Dreams May Come / April 1990
6. The Glass Shoe / November 1989
7. Golden Threads / September 1989

=== The Bishop / Special Crimes Unit series ===
Shadows trilogy

1. Stealing Shadows. August 2000. ISBN 978-0-553-57553-8.
2. Hiding in the Shadows. September 2000. ISBN 978-0-553-57692-4.
3. Out of the Shadows. October 2000. ISBN 978-0-553-57695-5.

Evil trilogy

1. Touching Evil. July 2001. ISBN 978-0-553-58344-1.
2. Whisper of Evil. July 2002. ISBN 978-0-553-58346-5.
3. Sense of Evil. July 2003. ISBN 978-0-553-80300-6.

Fear trilogy

1. Hunting Fear. July 2004. ISBN 978-0-553-80316-7.
2. Chill of Fear. July 2005. ISBN 978-0-553-80317-4.
3. Sleeping With Fear. July 2006. ISBN 978-0-553-80318-1.

Blood trilogy

1. Blood Dreams. December 2007. ISBN 978-0-553-80484-3.
2. Blood Sins. December 2008. ISBN 978-0-553-80485-0.
3. Blood Ties. January 2010. ISBN 978-0-553-80486-7.

Haven trilogy

1. Haven. Berkley Books. July 2012. ISBN 978-0-425-25874-3.
2. Hostage. November 2013.
3. Haunted. September 2014.

Dark Trilogy

1. Fear the Dark. October 2015.
2. Wait for Dark. March 2017.
3. Hold Back the Dark. April 2018.

The Bishop Files

1. The First Prophet. November 2012.
2. A Deadly Web. December 2014.
3. Final Shadows. December 2018.

Bishop / Special Crimes Unit

1. Hidden Salem. April 2020.
2. Curse of Salem. April 2021.
3. Why are there no more books in this series

=== The Hagen series ===
1. Aces High / April 1989
2. It Takes a Thief / March 1989
3. Captain's Paradise / December 1988
4. Shades of Gray / October 1988
5. Outlaw Derek / April 1988
6. Unmasking Kelsey / February 1988
7. The Fall of Lucas Kendrick / January 1988
8. Zach's Law / December 1987
9. Rafferty's Wife / November 1987
10. Raven on the Wing / May 1987
11. In Serena's Web / April 1987

=== Compilations ===
- The Real Thing / November 2004
  (Reissue of 2 novels: Enemy Mine and The Haviland Touch)
- Elusive / March 2004
  (Reissue of 3 novels: Elusive Dawn, On Her Doorstep, and Return Engagement)
- Enchanted / January 2003
  (Reissue of 3 novels: Kissed by Magic, Belonging to Taylor, and Eye of the Beholder)

=== Stand-alone novels ===
- Haunting Rachel / July 1999
- Finding Laura / July 1998
- After Caroline / October 1997
- Amanda / September 1996
- The Haunting of Josie / August 1994
- Masquerade / February 1994
- The Wizard of Seattle / June 1993
- House of Cards / November 1991
- The Haviland Touch / June 1991 (Reissued December 2005)
- Crime of Passion / February 1991
- Enemy Mine / August 1989 (Reissued November 2005)
- Delaney Historicals II: Velvet Lightning / November 1988
- Delaney Historicals: Golden Flames / April 1988
- Summer of the Unicorn / March 1988
- The Delaney's of Killaroo: Adelaide, the Enchantress / September 1987
- On Her Doorstep / December 1986
- The Shamrock Trinity: Rafe, the Maverick / October 1986
- Time After Time / July 1986
- Larger Than Life (1986; available only through Loveswept book club until 2009 reissue)
- Belonging to Taylor / March 1986
- Rebel Waltz / February 1986
- Eye of the Beholder / May 1985
- Illegal Possession / March 1985
- If There Be Dragons / December 1984
- Pepper's Way / September 1984
- Something Different / May 1984
- Moonlight Rhapsody / May 1984
- CJ's Fate / February 1984
- Kissed by Magic / November 1983
- Elusive Dawn / July 1983
- On Wings of Magic / June 1983
- Taken by Storm / March 1983
- Breathless Surrender / November 1982
- Return Engagement / September 1982
- Mask of Passion / August 1982
- Lady Thief / July 1981 (Reissued March 2005)

=== Stories published in anthologies ===
- Hooper, Kay; Pappano, Marilyn; Martin, Michelle; Shalvis, Jill; Kauffman, Donna (December 1999). "Arts Magica". Yours 2 Keep. ISBN 978-0-553-58167-6.
- Hooper, Kay; Chastain, Sandra; Krinard, Susan; Thornton, Elizabeth; Monk, Karyn (March 1995). "Almost an Angel". My Guardian Angel. ISBN 978-0-553-76260-0.
- Hooper, Kay; Johansen, Iris; Preston, Fayrene (November 2005) [December 1992]. "Christmas Future". The Delaney Christmas Carol. ISBN 978-0-553-80287-0.
- Hooper, Kay; Drake, Shannon; Davis, Diane Wicker; Kleypas, Lisa (Christmas 1991). "Holiday Spirit". Christmas Love Stories. HarperCollins Publishers. ISBN 978-0-380-76572-0.
