= Doug Hutchison =

American actor (born 1960)

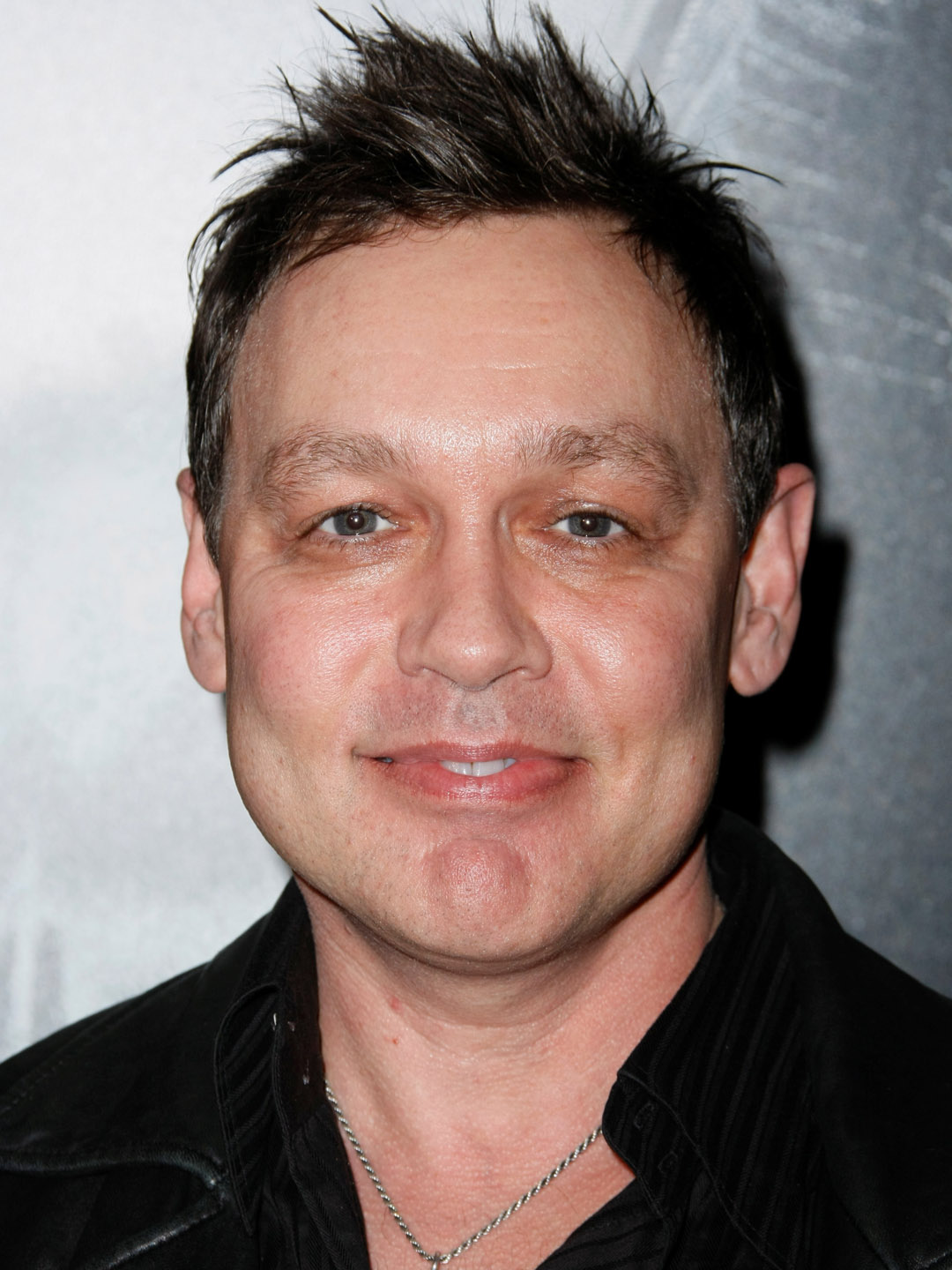
- Hutchison in 2008
- Born: Doug Anthony Hutchison; May 26, 1960 (age 66); Dover, Delaware, U.S.
- Education: University of Minnesota; Juilliard School
- Occupation: Actor
- Years active: 1988–present
- Spouses: Kathleen Davison (m. 1999; div. 2002); Amanda Sellers (m. 2002; div. 2005); Courtney Stodden (m. 2011; div. 2020)

Doug Anthony Hutchison (born May 26, 1960) is an American actor known for his character roles in film and television, often playing disturbed and antagonistic characters. He was nominated for a Satellite Award for his portrayal of the sadistic corrections officer Percy Wetmore in the 1999 film adaptation of the Stephen King novel The Green Mile.

His other notable film roles include Obie Jameson in The Chocolate War (1988), Sproles in Fresh Horses (also 1988), Pete Willard in A Time to Kill (1996), and "Looney Bin Jim" in the Marvel Comics film adaptation Punisher: War Zone (2008). On television, Hutchison played a memorable guest role as Eugene Victor Tooms on The X-Files (1993, 1994) and a recurring role as Horace Goodspeed on Lost (2007–2009).

In 2011, at the age of 51, he received widespread criticism when he married 16-year-old child model Courtney Stodden. In 2021, after the couple had divorced, Stodden accused Hutchison of verbal abuse and sexual grooming. Hutchison denied the allegations.

== Early life ==
Hutchison was born May 26, 1960, in Dover, Delaware. He attended Bishop Foley Catholic High School in Madison Heights, Michigan, and graduated from Apple Valley High School in Apple Valley, Minnesota, in 1978. He later attended University of Minnesota at Minneapolis-St Paul, and studied at the Juilliard School in New York City.

== Career ==
Hutchison's first professional theater credit came shortly after he graduated high school, when he starred as Alan Strang in a Saint Paul, Minnesota, production of Equus.

Hutchison's early stage credits include Sing to Me Through Open Windows and William Shakespeare's Julius Caesar. He has made guest appearances on television shows such as The Young Riders, The X-Files (as Eugene Victor Tooms), Space: Above and Beyond (as Elroy-El), Millennium (as "Omega"), Lost (as Horace Goodspeed), Guiding Light (as Sebastian Hulce), Law & Order: Special Victims Unit (as serial killer Humphrey Becker), and 24 (as European terrorist Davros).

Hutchison's film work began in the late 1980s, appearing as Sproles in the 1988 drama Fresh Horses and Obie Jameson in the 1988 film adaptation of The Chocolate War. Of his performance in Fresh Horses, one critic observed that he "hoist[ed the film] onto his shoulders for the duration of his scenes". In the 1990s, he appeared in films such as The Lawnmower Man (1992), A Time to Kill (1996), Con Air (1997), and Batman & Robin (1997), The Green Mile (1999). His later supporting roles included Shaft (2000), Bait (2000), I Am Sam (2001), The Salton Sea (2002), and No Good Deed (2002).

His 2000s feature film roles included playing James "Looney Bin Jim" Russotti in the Punisher: War Zone, and his television roles included Horace Goodspeed in Lost. He also starred in Give 'Em Hell, Malone (2009). In October 2008, Hutchison's production company, Dark Water, debuted the web series Vampire Killers, which depicts four vampire hunters combating a vampire population of over 500,000 in Los Angeles.

== Personal life ==
On May 20, 2011, Hutchison married his third wife, Courtney Stodden, in Las Vegas. They met when Stodden, whom Hutchison initially believed to be "well into her twenties", attended an acting class taught by Hutchison. Their relationship drew controversy and criticism, as Stodden was 16 years old when the couple married, and Hutchison was 50. It was legal at that time to marry a 16-year-old in Nevada with parental consent. According to Hutchison, his agent quit, his family disowned him, he received insults and death threats, and he was labeled a "pedophile" as a result of the marriage. Hutchison had some defenders: Stodden's mother, Krista Keller, who praised him for the kindness and love with which he treated Stodden, and Dr. Jenn Berman, a therapist who worked with the couple during their appearance on Couples Therapy.

In October 2012, the couple appeared as one of the celebrity couples in the second season of the VH1 reality television series Couples Therapy, which depicts celebrity couples undergoing counseling for relationship problems. According to Stodden, the couple enrolled in therapy in order to resolve issues that arose in their marriage from their age difference. On November 1, 2013, the media reported that Stodden and Hutchison were ending their marriage of two and a half years and filing for divorce. In August 2014, the pair announced that they had reconciled.

In May 2016, it was announced that the couple was expecting their first child. In July 2016, around three months into the pregnancy, Stodden suffered a miscarriage. On May 20, 2016, Hutchison and Stodden celebrated their fifth wedding anniversary by renewing their vows.

In January 2017, it was reported that Stodden and Hutchison had separated, but were still living together at the time. In March 2018, Stodden filed for divorce, which was finalized in March 2020.

Since their divorce, Stodden has described their marriage as "extremely abusive".

=== Grooming allegations ===
In 2021, Stodden publicly stated that their marriage was a result of Hutchison's grooming, which allegedly started with him reaching out via email.

Stodden has alleged that Hutchison started a similar relationship with a 15-year-old girl within a month of their divorce. The Daily Beast has corroborated the existence of romantic "written correspondences and voicemail recordings" between them.

== Filmography ==
=== Film ===
Year	Title	Role	Notes
1988	The Chocolate War	Obie	
1988	Fresh Horses	Sproles	
1992	The Lawnmower Man	Security Tech	
1996	A Time to Kill	James Louis "Pete" Willard	
1996	Love Always	James	
1997	Con Air	Donald	
1997	Batman & Robin	Golum	
1999	The Green Mile	Percy Wetmore	Nominated — Awards Circuit Community Award for Best Cast Ensemble; Nominated — Satellite Award for Best Supporting Actor – Motion Picture; Nominated — Screen Actors Guild Award for Outstanding Performance by a Cast in a Motion Picture
2000	Shaft	Plane Door Opener	Uncredited
2000	Bait	Bristol	
2001	I Am Sam	Ifty	
2002	The Salton Sea	Gus Morgan	
2002	No Good Deed	Hoop	
2007	Moola	J.T. Montgomery	
2008	The Burrowers	Henry Victor	
2008	Punisher: War Zone	Loony Bin Jim	
2008	Days of Wrath	Vadim	
2009	Give 'Em Hell, Malone	"Matchstick"	
2014	Alien's Sister	Albert	Short film

=== Television ===
Year	Title	Role	Notes
1990	The Young Riders	Danny	Episode: "Blood Moon"
1991	China Beach	Medic	Uncredited; Episode: "Hello Goodbye"
1993	Love & War	Arthur Berkus	Episode: "Croton on Hudson"
1993–94	The X-Files	Eugene Victor Tooms	2 episodes
1994	Robin's Hoods	Jimmy	Episode: "Reunion"
1994	Party of Five	Loren	4 episodes
1995	Diagnosis: Murder	Baseline	Episode: "My Baby Is Out Of This World"
1995	Murder, She Wrote	Angus Neville	Episode: "Deadly Bidding"
1995–96	Space: Above and Beyond	Elroy-El	3 episodes
1997	Millennium	The Polaroid Man	Episode: "The Beginning and the End"
2001	The Practice	Jackie Cahill	2 episodes
2002	CSI: Crime Scene Investigation	Nigel Crane	Episode: "Stalker"
2002–03	John Doe	Lenny Pescoe	2 episodes
2003	Boomtown	Wally Pollard	Episode: "Wannabe"
2004	CSI: Miami	Dale Stahl	Episode: "Slow Burn"
2004	Law & Order: Special Victims Unit	Humphrey Becker	Episode: "Scavenger"
2004–05	Guiding Light	Sebastian Hulce	11 episodes
2006–07	Kidnapped	Schroeder / James Devere	7 episodes
2007–09	Lost	Horace Goodspeed	7 episodes
2010	24	Davros	4 episodes
2011	Lie to Me	Lane Bradley	Episode: "Gone"
2015	CSI: Crime Scene Investigation	Dalton Betton	Episode: "Immortality"
2019	iZombie	Hal	Episode: "Death of a Car Salesman"
2020	Hope for the Holidays	Sergeant Babbitt	TV movie

=== Video games ===
Year	Title	Role	Notes
2018	Far Cry 5	Federal Marshal Cameron Burke	Voice and motion capture performance
