= Michael Cogdill =

American novelist and television professional

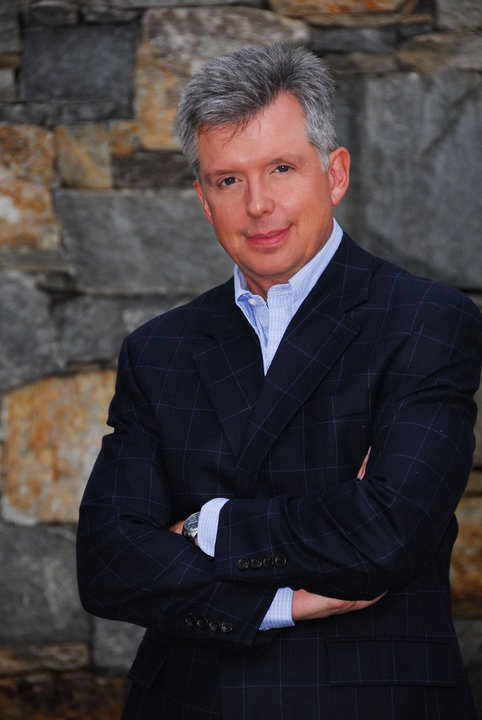
- Born: June 11, 1961 (age 65); Asheville, North Carolina, U.S.
- Education: North Buncombe High School; University of North Carolina at Asheville (BA)
- Occupations: Journalist; Anchor; Novelist; Screenwriter; Film producer
- Spouse: Danette Luanne Cogdill
- Website: https://michaelcogdill.wordpress.com/

Michael Cogdill (born George Michael Cogdill; June 11, 1961) is an American journalist, anchor, novelist, screenwriter, and film producer. His work as a journalist has appeared on NBC’s Today Show, CNBC, MSNBC, and CNN, and is the recipient of 32 Emmys and a Edward R. Murrow Award.

== Early life ==
Cogdill was born in Asheville, North Carolina, the son of a truck driver and a mill worker. His earliest jobs included mowing lawns, cleaning horse stalls, and working as a production assistant on film sets. He graduated from North Buncombe High School in Weaverville, North Carolina in 1979 and then graduated cum laude from the University of North Carolina at Asheville in 1984, earning a BA degree in communications.

== Early television career ==
Two weeks after college graduation, Cogdill began his career in television, working at WECT, an NBC affiliate in Wilmington, North Carolina. He soon moved over to WWAY, Wilmington's ABC station, and later migrated to CBS-aligned WRDW-TV in Augusta, Georgia. He finally landed at Greenville, South Carolina station WYFF (an NBC affiliate) in 1989, where he cemented his position as arguably the most decorated anchorman in South Carolina history.

== National acclaim ==
Cogdill first rose to prominence when he reported on the story of Susan Smith, a Union, South Carolina woman convicted of murdering her two young sons in 1994 (after initially claiming that an African-American man had carjacked her and kidnapped the children). Cogdill's Susan Smith: A Question of Justice (1996) garnered an Emmy, leading to appearances on NBC's Today Show, CNBC, MSNBC, and CNN.

== Books ==
Cogdill is the author of She-Rain, a novel set in rural western North Carolina in the 1920s.

== Film ==
In 2014 it was announced that filmmaker Richard O'Sullivan had plans to develop She-Rain into a feature film with Cogdill's production company HeartStrong Media serving as a producing partner.

== Awards ==
In addition to winning the Edward R. Murrow Award and 30 Emmys, Cogdill has received the South Carolina Broadcasters Association Star Award, a South Carolina Television Journalist Award, and has been a multiple winner of the Radio and Television News Director Association of the Carolinas Award.
