= Fantastic Four in film =

Adaptions of Fantastic Four in films

Logo from the 2005–2007 film series

The superhero team Fantastic Four, featured in Marvel Comics publications, has appeared in five live-action films since its inception. The plots deal with four main characters, known formally as Reed Richards, Susan Storm, Ben Grimm, and Johnny Storm, and how they adapt to the superpowers they attain.

Constantin Film bought the film rights for the characters in 1986. A low-budget film was produced in 1992 by New Horizon Studios, owned by Roger Corman, though it has never been officially released. In 2004, after Constantin sub-licensed the film rights to 20th Century Fox, a second Fantastic Four film entered production. Fantastic Four was released in 2005 and the sequel Fantastic Four: Rise of the Silver Surfer was released in 2007. Both films were ill-received by critics, yet earned a combined US$635 million worldwide at the box office. Due to Fox's disappointment with the box-office returns of Rise of the Silver Surfer, a potential third film and a Silver Surfer spin-off film were canceled.

A reboot of the series, Fantastic Four, directed by Josh Trank, was released in 2015 and received largely negative reviews from both critics and audiences, and was a box-office bomb. Trank himself disowned the final product, claiming studio interference from Fox. A sequel was scheduled to be released in 2017, but was canceled.

In March 2019, Marvel Studios regained the film rights to the Fantastic Four and their associated characters, after the acquisition of 21st Century Fox by Disney. The Fantastic Four: First Steps, part of Phase Six of the Marvel Cinematic Universe (MCU), was released in 2025 and became the most positively reviewed film in the series.

After the acquisition, the Fox-produced Fantastic Four films were rebranded as "Marvel Legacy" films on Disney+ alongside other non-MCU Marvel films. They were then retitled "Fantastic Adventures" in July 2023, alongside two Fantastic Four animated series.

== The Fantastic Four (1994, unreleased) ==
The plot follows four astronauts on an experimental spacecraft who are bombarded with a comet's cosmic rays, whereby they acquire extraordinary abilities.

Bernd Eichinger of Constantin Film acquired the film rights of the Fantastic Four from Marvel Comics in 1986. To maintain the rights, Eichinger hired Roger Corman in 1992 to produce a low-budget film. The 1994 adaptation The Fantastic Four had its trailer released to theaters, while the cast and director went on a promotional tour; however, the film was never officially released. Some accused the film of being a ashcan copy, made only to retain the license. Stan Lee and Eichinger stated that the actors had no idea of the situation, instead believing they were creating a proper release. Marvel Comics paid in exchange for the film's negative, so 20th Century Fox could go ahead with the big-budget adaptation. While released neither to theaters nor home video, bootleg copies did surface, and as of 2025, the film is available to watch on YouTube and Dailymotion for free.

== Tim Story films (2005–2007) ==
=== Fantastic Four (2005) ===
The story features Reed Richards, Ben Grimm, Susan Storm, Johnny Storm, and Victor Von Doom getting hit by a space storm after boarding a space station. As a result of the radiation from the storm, they gain new abilities and powers that they have to deal with in their own ways.

Chris Columbus was hired by 20th Century Fox to write and direct the film in 1995. In 1997, Peter Segal was attached to a script which had been written by Columbus and Michael France. Segal later left the project in the same year. Phillip Morton worked on the script, and Sam Hamm did rewrites in 1998. The following year, Raja Gosnell signed on as director. The film was announced in August 2000 as being aimed for a July 4, 2001, release date. Gosnell decided to leave the project to film Scooby-Doo. Peyton Reed served as a replacement in April 2001. Reed contemplated making the film as a period piece set in the early 1960s during the space race. He later dropped out from the film. In April 2004, Tim Story was hired to direct, and principal photography began in August in Vancouver, British Columbia, Canada, with re-shoots carried on until May 2005. Starring Ioan Gruffudd, Jessica Alba, Chris Evans, Michael Chiklis and Julian McMahon, the film was released on July 8, 2005.

=== Fantastic Four: Rise of the Silver Surfer (2007) ===
The story, both inspired by Stan Lee and Jack Kirby's Fantastic Four comic-book storyline "The Galactus Trilogy" and Warren Ellis's comic-book Ultimate Extinction, features the Silver Surfer, whose cosmic energy has been affecting the planet Earth and leaving craters around the planet. Set against an impending wedding between Reed and Susan, the U.S. Army recruits the Fantastic Four to help stop the Silver Surfer, and separately gain help from Doom.

With Fantastic Four grossing $333.5 million worldwide, 20th Century Fox hired director Tim Story and screenwriter Mark Frost in December 2005 to return to work on the sequel. Don Payne was also hired to write the screenplay. Principal photography began on August 28, 2006, in Vancouver, British Columbia, Canada. The film was released on June 15, 2007.

Due to 20th Century Fox's disappointment in the box-office performance of the film, a potential third Fantastic Four film and a Silver Surfer spin-off film were canceled.

== Fantastic Four (2015) ==
The story, loosely based on the Ultimate Fantastic Four comic books, features four people teleporting to an alternate universe, which alters their physical form and grants them new abilities. They must learn to harness their abilities and work together as a team to save the Earth from a familiar enemy.

In August 2009, development for a reboot of the Fantastic Four film franchise was announced by 20th Century Fox. In July 2012, Josh Trank was hired to direct. Michael Green, Jeremy Slater, Seth Grahame-Smith and Simon Kinberg were hired to write the screenplay with Slater and Kinberg receiving credit. Casting began in January 2014 with the announcement of the cast occurred in the following months. Principal photography began in May 2014 in Baton Rouge, Louisiana and ended in August the same year. Starring Miles Teller, Kate Mara, Michael B. Jordan, Jamie Bell and Toby Kebbell, the film was released on August 7, 2015. The film received largely negative reviews, was a box-office bomb, and is often considered one of the worst superhero films ever made. A sequel was originally planned for 2017, but was removed from the studio's schedule in November 2015. This was also the last Fantastic Four film produced by Fox before the company was acquired by Disney in 2019, allowing Marvel Studios to regain the rights to the Fantastic Four characters.

== Marvel Cinematic Universe (2022–present) ==
=== Doctor Strange in the Multiverse of Madness (2022) ===
An alternate version of Reed Richards appeared in the Marvel Cinematic Universe (MCU) film Doctor Strange in the Multiverse of Madness (2022), played by actor John Krasinski, a popular fancasting choice for the character. This version of the character, originating from Earth-838, is both a founding member of his reality's Fantastic Four team, as well as a council member on the Illuminati alongside other superpowered individuals, who observe and apprehend potential threats to the wider Multiverse. He is initially present at the trial of the displaced Stephen Strange from Earth-616 (Benedict Cumberbatch), whom he warns for potentially causing an incursion as his reality's Strange did. However, before he and his colleagues could decide on Strange's consequences, they would be confronted by the corrupted Wanda Maximoff / Scarlet Witch from 616-Strange's reality, who possessed a body of her own variant to infiltrate their headquarters. In spite of Richards' attempts to reason with Wanda without resorting to physical conflict, he is killed alongside most of his associates via shredding after Wanda coldly muses that someone will be alive to raise his children. Additionally, the Earth-838 Christine Palmer is mentioned to be a member of the Baxter Foundation as a Multiverse analyst and researcher.

Before the film's release, Disney and Marvel Studios had attempted to retain secrecy surrounding both the inclusion of Mister Fantastic and Krasinski's involvement in the film. However, his appearance in the film alongside the other then-unrevealed Illuminati members would be leaked just before the film's wide release on May 6, 2022, through the circulation of footage and pictures depicting his character.

=== Deadpool & Wolverine (2024) ===
Chris Evans reprises his role as the incarnation of Johnny Storm from the Tim Story films in the Marvel Cinematic Universe (MCU) film Deadpool & Wolverine (2024). He was sent to the Void by the Time Variance Authority and became part of a Resistance group against Cassandra Nova. In the movie, a mysterious figure comes across Deadpool and Wolverine when the two are fighting each other in the Void. He was anticipated by Deadpool to be Steve Rogers (whom Evans portrayed in the MCU), only to reveal himself as Johnny Storm. After a brief stand-off with Pyro, Johnny is captured alongside Deadpool and Wolverine. Upon their arrival at Cassandra Nova's lair, Deadpool repeats Johnny's supposed insults towards Nova. When Johnny protests these claims, Cassandra swiftly kills Johnny by removing his skin and muscles, with his body falling apart nearly instantly. Throughout the film, Wolverine holds Johnny's death over Deadpool's head, but in the film's post-credits scene, Wade shows footage proving Johnny's insults true.

Additionally, the Fantasti-Car appears, ridden by Toad, and Reed Richards is mentioned by Johnny, who says Richards had been studying the multiverse learning about the Void.

=== Thunderbolts* (2025) ===
In a post-credit scene, the New Avengers receive a distress signal from the Fantastic Four's spaceship as it enters Earth-616 from an alternate reality, Earth-828.

=== The Fantastic Four: First Steps (2025) ===
Disney's CEO Bob Iger stated that they plan to integrate the Fantastic Four into the Marvel Cinematic Universe (MCU) after purchasing Fox Studios in a $71.3 billion deal, officially completed in March 2019. At the 2019 Marvel Studios San Diego Comic-Con presentation, Kevin Feige announced a Fantastic Four film set in the MCU. By December 2020, Jon Watts, who previously helmed the Spider-Man films set in the MCU, was attached to direct. In April 2022, Watts stepped down as director to take a break from directing superhero films. Later in July, Feige revealed that the reboot would not have an origin story. In August, Matt Shakman was in early talks to direct the film, which was confirmed in September during the Disney event D23. The same month, Jeff Kaplan and Ian Springer were hired as writers for the film. By March 2023, Josh Friedman was hired to rewrite the script. In February 2024, it was announced that the film would star Pedro Pascal as Mister Fantastic, Vanessa Kirby as Invisible Woman, Joseph Quinn as Human Torch, and Ebon Moss-Bachrach as the Thing. In April 2024, it was announced that Julia Garner would portray Shalla-Bal / Silver Surfer. In May 2024, Ralph Ineson was announced to play Galactus. By then, John Malkovich, Paul Walter Hauser, and Natasha Lyonne were added to the cast. In late June, Feige confirmed that the film would be set in a 1960s-inspired retro-futuristic alternate reality rather than the main MCU continuity. Principal photography began in London in late July 2024 and wrapped in November 2024.

The Fantastic Four: First Steps was released in the United States on July 25, 2025, as part of Phase Six of the MCU.

During Marvel's Hall H panel at San Diego Comic-Con in 2024, Michael Giacchino was announced to be composing the score for the film.

=== Avengers: Doomsday (2026) and Avengers: Secret Wars (2027) ===
At San Diego Comic-Con in July 2024, Pascal, Kirby, Quinn, and Moss-Bachrach were confirmed to be reprising their roles in the films Avengers: Doomsday (2026) and Avengers: Secret Wars (2027), starring alongside Robert Downey Jr. (who previously portrayed Tony Stark / Iron Man in the MCU) as Doctor Doom. Downey reprises his role as Doom from the mid-credits scene of First Steps.

== Recurring cast and characters ==
List indicators

This section includes characters who will appear or have appeared in more than two films in the series.

- An empty grey cell indicates the character was not in the film, or that the character's official presence has not yet been confirmed.
- ^{U} indicates an uncredited appearance.
- ^{V} indicates a voice-only role.
- ^{Y} indicates a younger version of the character.

Character	The Fantastic Four	20th Century Fox releases			Marvel Cinematic Universe				
Character	The Fantastic Four	Tim Story films		Fantastic Four	Phase Four	Phase Five	Phase Six		
Character	The Fantastic Four	Fantastic Four	Fantastic Four: Rise of the Silver Surfer	Fantastic Four	Doctor Strange in the Multiverse of Madness	Deadpool & Wolverine	The Fantastic Four: First Steps	Avengers: Doomsday	Avengers: Secret Wars
Character	1994	2005	2007	2015	2022	2024	2025	2026	2027
Reed Richards Mister Fantastic	Alex Hyde-White	Ioan Gruffudd	Ioan Gruffudd	Miles Teller Owen Judge^{Y}	John Krasinski (Note: Krasinski portrays a variant of the character from Earth-838.)		Pedro Pascal	Pedro Pascal	Pedro Pascal
Sue Storm Invisible Woman	Rebecca Staab Mercedes McNab^{Y}	Jessica Alba	Jessica Alba	Kate Mara			Vanessa Kirby	Vanessa Kirby	Vanessa Kirby
Johnny Storm Human Torch	Jay Underwood Phillip Van Dyke^{Y}	Chris Evans	Chris Evans	Michael B. Jordan		Chris Evans (Note: Evans portrays the same version from the 2005 and 2007 films.)	Joseph Quinn	Joseph Quinn	Joseph Quinn
Ben Grimm The Thing	Carl Ciarfalio Michael Bailey Smith	Michael Chiklis	Michael Chiklis	Jamie Bell Evan Hannemann^{Y}			Ebon Moss-Bachrach	Ebon Moss-Bachrach	Ebon Moss-Bachrach
Victor von Doom Doctor Doom	Joseph Culp	Julian McMahon	Julian McMahon	Toby Kebbell			Robert Downey Jr.^{U} (Note: Uncredited cameo despite Downey not showing face to the screen.)	Robert Downey Jr.	Robert Downey Jr.
Alicia Masters	Kat Green	Kerry Washington	Kerry Washington						
H.E.R.B.I.E.		Appeared					Matthew Wood^{V}		
Norrin Radd & Shalla-Bal Silver Surfer			Laurence Fishburne^{V} Doug Jones				Julia Garner (Note: Garner portrays a variation of the Shalla-Bal version of the Silver Surfer.)		
Galactus			Appeared				Ralph Ineson		
Harvey Allen / Harvey Elder Mole Man				Tim Blake Nelson			Paul Walter Hauser		
Franklin Richards							Ada Scott	TBA	

== Additional details ==
Crew	Film				
Crew	The Fantastic Four	Fantastic Four	Fantastic Four: Rise of the Silver Surfer	Fantastic Four	The Fantastic Four: First Steps
Crew	1994	2005	2007	2015	2025
Director	Oley Sassone	Tim Story	Tim Story	Josh Trank	Matt Shakman
Producer(s)	Steven Rabiner	Bernd Eichinger; Avi Arad; Ralph Winter	Bernd Eichinger; Avi Arad; Ralph Winter	Matthew Vaughn; Simon Kinberg; Gregory Goodman; Hutch Parker; Robert Kulzer	Kevin Feige
Executive producer(s)	Roger Corman; Bernd Eichinger; Glenn Garland; Jan Kikumoto	Stan Lee; Kevin Feige; Chris Columbus; Mark Radcliffe; Michael Barnathan		Stan Lee	Louis D'Esposito; Grant Curtis; Tim Lewis; Robert Kulzer
Writer(s)	Craig J. Nevius; Kevin Rock	Michael France; Mark Frost	Screenplay by Don Payne; Mark Frost; Story by John Turman; Mark Frost	Jeremy Slater; Simon Kinberg; Josh Trank	Screenplay by Josh Friedman; Eric Pearson; Jeff Kaplan; Ian Springer; Story by Eric Pearson; Jeff Kaplan; Ian Springer; Kat Wood
Composer(s)	David Wurst; Eric Wurst	John Ottman	John Ottman	Marco Beltrami; Philip Glass	Michael Giacchino
Director of photography	Mark Parry	Oliver Wood	Larry Blanford	Matthew Jensen	Jess Hall
Editor(s)	Glenn Garland	William Hoy	William Hoy; Peter S. Elliot	Elliot Greenberg; Stephen E. Rivkin	Nona Khodai; Tim Roche
Production Designer(s)	Mick Strawn	Bill Boes	Kirk M. Petruccelli	Chris Seagers	Kasra Farahani
Costume Designer(s)	Reve Richards	José I. Fernandez	Mary Vogt	George L. Little	Alexandra Byrne
Distributor(s)	New Concorde	20th Century Fox			Walt Disney Studios Motion Pictures
Running time	90 minutes	106 minutes	92 minutes	100 minutes	114 minutes
Budget	$1 million	$87.5—100 million	$130 million	$120 million	$200 million

== Home media ==
20th Century Fox Home Entertainment released Fantastic Four (2005), Fantastic Four: Rise of the Silver Surfer and Fantastic Four (2015) on DVD, Blu-ray and digital download. The films were also released on DVD and Blu-ray box sets:

Title	Format	Release date	Films	Reference
Fantastic Four 2-Movie Collection	DVD	October 2, 2007	Fantastic Four (2005), Fantastic Four: Rise of the Silver Surfer	
The Ultimate Heroes Collection	DVD	October 16, 2007	Daredevil, Elektra, Fantastic Four (2005), X-Men	
Marvel Heroes	DVD	May 13, 2008	Daredevil, Elektra, Fantastic Four (2005), Fantastic Four: Rise of the Silver Surfer, X-Men, X2, X-Men: The Last Stand	
Blu-ray 3-Pack	Blu-ray	November 18, 2008	Daredevil, Fantastic Four (2005), Fantastic Four: Rise of the Silver Surfer	
20th Century Fox Triple Feature	DVD	June 1, 2010	Daredevil, Fantastic Four (2005), X-Men	
20th Century Fox Triple Feature	DVD	October 5, 2010	Daredevil, Elektra, Fantastic Four (2005)	
20th Century Fox Double Feature	DVD	October 5, 2010	Fantastic Four (2005), X-Men	
Fantastic Four / Fantastic Four: Rise of the Silver Surfer	Blu-ray	May 15, 2012	Fantastic Four (2005), Fantastic Four: Rise of the Silver Surfer	
Fantastic Four Double Feature	Blu-ray/Digital HD, DVD	March 8, 2016	Fantastic Four (2005), Fantastic Four: Rise of the Silver Surfer	

== Reception ==
=== Box office performance ===
Film	U.S. release date	Box office gross			Production budget	Ref.
Film	U.S. release date	North America	Other territories	Worldwide	Production budget	Ref.
Fantastic Four (2005)	July 8, 2005	$154,696,080	$178,839,854	$333,535,934	$87.5–100 million	
Fantastic Four: Rise of the Silver Surfer (2007)	June 15, 2007	$131,921,738	$169,991,393	$301,913,131	$120–130 million	
Fantastic Four (2015)	August 7, 2015	$56,117,548	$111,765,333	$167,882,881	$120–155 million	
The Fantastic Four: First Steps (2025)	July 25, 2025	$274,286,610	$247,572,118	$521,858,728	$200 million	
Totals		$617,021,976	$708,168,698	$1,325,190,674	$527.5–585 million	

The Fantastic Four film series has grossed over $608 million in North America and over $1.3 billion worldwide.

=== Critical and public response ===
Film	Critical		Public
Film	Rotten Tomatoes	Metacritic	CinemaScore
The Fantastic Four	33% (13 reviews)	—N/a	—N/a
Fantastic Four (2005)	28% (217 reviews)	40 (35 reviews)	B
Fantastic Four: Rise of the Silver Surfer	38% (173 reviews)	45 (33 reviews)	B
Fantastic Four (2015)	9% (260 reviews)	27 (40 reviews)	C−
The Fantastic Four: First Steps	86% (401 reviews)	65 (54 reviews)	A−

None of the pre-MCU Fantastic Four films received a positive critical reception. Scott Weinberg of eFilmCritic called the 1994 film "[a] painfully silly film, one with more heroic intentions than actual assets".

Rene Rodriguez of Miami Herald gave negative reviews to the Fantastic Four films directed by Tim Story. Regarding Rise of the Silver Surfer, he said that the "story does the same sort of efficient, impersonal job he did on the first film, keeping things at such a basic, almost childish level that it seems the movie is aimed squarely, if not exclusively, at the 12-and-under set". However, Roger Moore of Orlando Sentinel gave Story's Fantastic Four films good reviews. He called the first film a "popcorn popper" and a "cinematic sugar buzz" and the second film an "entertaining film that doesn't overstay its welcome".

The 2015 reboot film was the weakest reviewed in the series. It was criticized for its dark and humorless tone, its character arcs, designs (especially that of Dr. Doom), bland acting, and poorly written story. Director Josh Trank was not satisfied, posting a message on Twitter stating he had envisioned a better version of the film, which audiences would "probably never see". He later deleted the message.

First Steps was the first Fantastic Four film to receive mainly positive reviews.

== Cancelled films ==
=== Fantastic Four 3 ===
A third installment of the 2005 Fantastic Four series was stated to be under consideration. In May 2007, before the release of The Rise of the Silver Surfer, Tim Story, who directed the first two installments, expressed his interest in casting Djimon Hounsou as Black Panther. A month later, he stated he had wanted to feature the Puppet Master as a villain. By August 2009, a potential third Fantastic Four film was cancelled.

=== Doctor Doom ===
At the 2017 San Diego Comic-Con, Noah Hawley said that he was developing a film centered on Doctor Doom. Dan Stevens was also said to be involved with the film. In June 2018, Hawley said that the script was almost finished, but that there was "a little uncertainty" about whether it would be filmed due to his upcoming film Pale Blue Dot and the acquisition of 21st Century Fox by Disney. In 2019, Hawley revealed that he was still unsure about whether he would be continuing the project, as it had not been officially greenlit, but that he had spoken to Kevin Feige about it. That August, Hawley told Deadline that the movie "is done", implying that he was no longer working on it.

=== Silver Surfer ===
In 2007, after the release of Fantastic Four: Rise of the Silver Surfer, 20th Century Fox hired J. Michael Straczynski to write the screenplay for the Silver Surfer spin-off film. Straczynski said his script was a sequel, but also delved into the Silver Surfer's origins. It was later canceled after Fox decided to reboot the Fantastic Four film series.

In February 2018, a Silver Surfer film was in development with Brian K. Vaughan attached to the script.

=== Fantastic Four 2 ===
Before 2015's Fantastic Four began filming, 20th Century Fox announced plans for a sequel with a scheduled release date of July 14, 2017. Fox then rescheduled the release for June 2, 2017, with War for the Planet of the Apes taking its place on the July 14, 2017, slot. It changed the release date again to June 9, 2017, to be two weeks after Star Wars: The Last Jedi's initial scheduled release date of May 26, 2017. Due to Fantastic Four's poor box office performance of and negative reviews, Pamela McClintock of The Hollywood Reporter said that it "throws into question whether Fox will move ahead with a sequel". In November 2015, the sequel was removed from Fox's release schedule. When asked by Collider whether they would make another Fantastic Four film, Kinberg stated: "I have no idea. I think the truth is we would not do another Fantastic Four movie until it was ready to be made. One of the lessons we learned on that movie is we want to make sure to get it 100% right, because we will not get another chance with the fans".

Concept artist Alexander Lozano revealed that Trank's iteration of the Fantastic Four were considered for cameo appearances in Tim Miller's take on Deadpool 2.
