= Carl Ciarfalio =

American actor and stuntman (1953–2025)

- Born: Carl Nick Ciarfalio; November 12, 1953; Alhambra, California, U.S.
- Died: November 19, 2025 (aged 72); Huntsville, Alabama, U.S.
- Occupations: Actor; stuntman
- Years active: 1979–2025
- Website: carlciarfalio.com

Carl Nick Ciarfalio (November 12, 1953 – November 19, 2025) was an American actor and stuntman. In a career spanning over four decades, he appeared in over 300 film and television projects. He is best known for portraying the Thing in the Roger Corman produced, but unreleased film The Fantastic Four.

== Life and career ==
Ciarfalio started his career as a plumber's associate when he was invited by one of his wrestling associates to join him at Knott's Berry Farm, as they were looking for big and tall actors to perform for audiences. Ciarfalio took the job for the summer before he would enroll in Cal State Fullerton that September, but he found himself enjoying it. "[W]ithin a couple of months I had a cowboy hat and a gun and I was on stage and people were applauding and laughing, and I told my parents, 'I'll go back to school one day'." Ciarfalio never returned to school and instead embarked on his long career as a stuntman. He began appearing in numerous film and television projects over the years such as Fight Club, Mission: Impossible III and The Amazing Spider-Man.

The most notable role of his career occurred in 1993, when Ciarfalio received a call from his agent to appear in a Roger Corman produced film adaptation of Marvel Comics Fantastic Four. "They were looking for a stunt man. They were looking for somebody about six feet tall and weighed about 220 pounds or so...So, I went to the audition and we talked a little bit and they thought I was the guy, which was, you know, very cool." While the actor who was playing Ben Grimm (Michael Bailey Smith) was tall, he was unable to fit in the Thing suit. Ciarfalio was brought in to wear the costume, which he found "the hottest fucking thing" he ever wore.

On October 20, 2014, Ciarfalio launched a Kickstarter campaign to have a biography book published. He reached his goal at $11,055 and in September 2015 published Stars, Stunts and Stories: A Hollywood Stuntman's Fall to Fame. The book was co-written by his wife Teri Ryan.

On November 19, 2025, it was announced by Ciarfalio’s wife Teri Ryan that Ciarfalio had passed away at the age of 72 in Huntsville, Alabama.

== Filmography ==
=== Stunts ===
Television roles
Year	Title	Note
1979	B.J. and the Bear	Episode: "The Eyes of Texas"; Stunt performer; uncredited
1984	Scarecrow and Mrs. King	Episode: "Fearless Dotty"; Stunt performer
1985	Wes Craven's Chiller	TV movie; Stunt double: Paul Sorvino
1985	J.O.E. and the Colonel	TV movie; uncredited
1988	In the Heat of the Night	Episode: "Road Kill"; uncredited
1988	Simon & Simon	Episode: "First, Let's Kill All the Lawyers"; uncredited
1989	Fair Game	TV Pilot; Stunt performer; uncredited
1990	The Great Los Angeles Earthquake	TV movie
1991	They Came from Outer Space	Episode: "Play Doctor"; uncredited
1991	The Flash	Episode: "Alpha"; uncredited
1991–1995	Murder, She Wrote	3 episodes; uncredited
1992	Quantum Leap	2 episodes; uncredited
1995	Family Matters	Episode: "The Substitute Son"; uncredited
1995	Alien Nation: Body and Soul	TV movie
1998	Dallas: War of the Ewings	TV movie
1998	Babylon 5: Thirdspace	TV movie; uncredited
1999	Velocity Trap	TV movie
2001	2001 ABC World Stunt Awards	TV special; Stunt coordinator
2001–2003	The Wayne Brady Show	7 episodes; Stunt coordinator
2003	The Bold and the Beautiful	1 episode; Stunt double
2005	The O.C.	Episode: "The O.C. Confidential"; Stunt performer
2006	ER	Episode: "Twenty-One Guns"; Stunt performer
2006	Without a Trace	Episode: "The Calm Before"; Stunt performer
2012	Fact Checkers Unit	Episode: "James Franco Is Preggers"; Stunt coordinators
2014	Isa	TV movie; Stunt coordinator
2014	Sharknado 2: The Second One	TV movie; Utility stunts
2014–2015	Justified	2 episodes; Stunt performer
2015	Community	Episode: "Modern Espionage"; uncredited
2015	Rellik	TV movie
2016	Westworld	Episode: "Dissonance Theory"; uncredited
2019	The Adventures of Gin and Sapphy	Episode: "Pharoahs Catacomb Part Two"; Stunt Supervisor

Film roles
Year	Title	Note
1979	Do It in the Dirt	
1983	The Osterman Weekend	
1983	D.C. Cab	
1984	Against All Odds	Stunt double: Alex Karras
1985	The Zoo Gang	
1985	Commando	
1985	To Live and Die in L.A.	Stunt player
1985	Runaway Train	
1986	Police Academy 3: Back in Training	
1986	Invaders from Mars	Stunt marine
1987	Number One with a Bullet	
1987	Extreme Prejudice	Uncredited
1987	Real Men	Stunt player
1987	Zebra Force	Stunt player
1987	Death Wish 4: The Crackdown	Stunt player
1988	Aloha Summer	
1988	Beetlejuice	
1988	Halloween 4: The Return of Michael Myers	
1989	Kinjite: Forbidden Subjects	Stunt player
1989	Criminal Act	
1989	No Holds Barred	Stunt player
1989	Lock Up	
1989	Cage	
1989	Johnny Handsome	
1989	Glory	Stunt player
1989	Think Big	
1990	Lionheart	Stunt double: Voyo Goric
1990	The Hunt for Red October	
1990	King of New York	
1990	RoboCop 2	Unnamed gun store robber
1990	State of Grace	
1990	Death Warrant	Stunt player
1990	The Rookie	
1991	Shakes the Clown	Additional stunts
1991	29th Street	
1992	Leather Jackets	
1992	Wayne's World	
1992	Class Act	
1992	Rapid Fire	
1992	Sneakers	
1992	The Public Eye	
1992	CIA Code Name: Alexa	Stunt player
1992	Sweet Justice	
1993	Trouble Bound	
1993	Best of the Best II	
1993	Street Knight	
1993	Ring of Fire 2: Blood and Steel	Uncredited
1993	Joshua Tree	Stunt double: Beau Starr
1993	RoboCop 3	Unnamed resistance fighter against OCP
1993	Private Wars	Direct-to-video
1993	CIA II: Target Alexa	
1993	Sister Act 2: Back in the Habit	
1993	No Escape, No Return	
1994	Monkey Trouble	Stunt player
1994	Direct Hit	Direct-to-video
1994	Beverly Hills Cop III	Stunt performer
1994	Zero Tolerance	
1994	Blankman	
1994	The Specialist	
1994	Stranger by Night	Direct-to-video
1994	A Low Down Dirty Shame	
1994	T-Force	
1994	Ring Of Fire 3: Lion Strike	
1995	For Better or Worse	
1995	Excessive Force II: Force on Force	
1995	Cover Me	Direct-to-video
1995	Mallrats	
1995	Get Shorty	
1995	Drifting School	Stunt coordinator and stunt performer
1995	Chameleon	
1996	One Tough Bastard	
1996	Foxfire	
1996	Feeling Minnesota	
1996	Crossworlds	Direct-to-video
1996	Santa with Muscles	Stunt double: Don Stark
1997	Romy and Michele's High School Reunion	Stunt limo driver
1997	Batman & Robin	
1997	Lolita	
1998	Vampires	
1998	Out of Sight	
1998	Memorial Day	
1999	Angel's Dance	
1999	Fight Club	Stunt performer
2001	A.I. Artificial Intelligence	
2001	Megiddo: The Omega Code 2	
2001	Corky Romano	
2002	Men in Black II	Uncredited
2002	Serving Sara	
2002	Leaving the Land	Stunt coordinator
2003	Daredevil	
2003	A Man Apart	
2003	Daddy Day Care	
2003	Bruce Almighty	
2003	Wonderland	Utility stunts
2003	Bad Santa	Stunt performer
2004	Starsky & Hutch	
2004	El Padrino	
2004	After the Sunset	
2005	Wedding Crashers	Stunt performer
2005	Shackles	Direct-to-video
2006	Mission: Impossible III	Uncredited
2006	The Fast and the Furious: Tokyo Drift	Direct-to-video
2007	Reno 911!: Miami	
2007	Redline	xStunt performer
2007	Forced Alliance	Short film; Stunt coordinator
2007	Shoot 'Em Up	
2008	The Hustle	Stunt coordinator
2008	Kemper: The CoEd Killer	Direct-to-video; uncredited
2008	Crazy Girls Undercover	Stunt player
2009	The Grind	Stunt coordinator
2009	Dark Moon Rising	
2009	Ballistica	
2010	Chain Letter	Stunt coordinator
2010	The Book of Eli	Stunt double: Joe Pingue
2011	The Green Hornet	Stunt performer; uncredited
2011	Kill the Irishman	
2012	The Amazing Spider-Man	Stunt performer; uncredited
2012	Total Recall	
2012	The Misadventures of the Dunderheads	Stunt performer
2012	Set Apart	Documentary short; Stunt performer
2013	Channeling	Stunt coordinator
2013	Extraction	Stunt performer; uncredited
2013	A Truth in Silence	Short film; Stunt coordinator
2013	Out of the Furnace	Stunt performer; uncredited
2014	Ride Along	Precision driver
2014	Swelter	Additional stunts; Stunt performer
2014	Come Back to Me	Stunt coordinator
2014	The Extendables	Stunt coordinator
2014	Mercenaries	Stunt performer
2014	Isa	Short film; Stunt coordinator
2014	Some Kind of Beautiful	Precision driver
2014	Tell	
2014	Taken 3	Stunt coordinator
2014	The Spy Who Came to Brunch	Short film; Stunt coordinator
2015	Frankenstein	Stunt rigger
2015	Tooken	Stunt co-coordinator
2015	Pontiac Angel	Short film; Stunt coordinator
2015	Sharknado: Heart of Sharkness	Direct-to-video
2015	Chaser	Short film; Stunt coordinator
2016	Meet the Blacks	Stunt coordinator
2016	Black Mass	Short film; Stunt coordinator
2017	Wyrm	Short film; Stunt coordinator
2018	Searching	Stunt driver
2018	Almost Home	Stunt coordinator
2019	I Hate Kids	Stunt coordinator
2019	American Bistro	Stunt coordinator
2020	Big America	Stunt coordinator
2021	The Little Things	Uncredited
2022	Tribute	Stunt coordinator

=== Actor ===
Film roles
Year	Title	Role	Note
1982	Cannery Row	Tackle	
1986	Black Moon Rising	Ringer's Man #1	
1987	Number One with a Bullet	Monte	
1987	Death Wish 4: The Crackdown	Henchman At Roller Rink	Uncredited
1989	Licence to Kill	Warehouse Guard #2	
1989	Cage	Hood #1	
1989	Think Big	Edwards	
1989	Lock Up	Prison Guard	Uncredited
1990	Fatal Charm	Cellblock Officer	Direct-to-video
1991	Eve of Destruction	Trooper Sergeant	
1991	The Perfect Weapon	Man In Alley	
1991	Scissors	Attacker	
1991	Out for Justice	Paulie	
1991	Beastmaster 2: Through the Portal of Time	Policeman #2	
1992	Freejack	Bonejacker #3	
1992	Far and Away	Italian Boxer	
1992	Death Ring	Pax, Bar Bully	Direct-to-video
1992	Rapid Fire	Gunman	Uncredited
1993	Trouble Bound	Ted	
1993	The Hit List	Second Hitman	
1993	Bounty Tracker	Hook	Direct-to-video
1993	Excessive Force	Guard #1	
1993	In the Line of Fire	CIA Agent Collins	
1993	No Escape, No Return	Bouncer At Club	
1994	Forced to Kill	Unknown	
1994	The Fantastic Four	The Thing	Officially starred
1994	Natural Born Killers	Mallory's Guard #2	
1994	The Specialist	Ned's Thug In Hotelroom	Uncredited
1994	Stranger by Night	Hank	Direct-to-video; uncredited
1994	Ring of Fire 3: Lion Strike	Vito	
1995	Night of the Running Man	Thug	
1995	Scanners: The Showdown	Lobby Cop #2	Direct-to-video
1995	Candyman: Farewell to the Flesh	Bartender	
1995	Casino	Tony 'Dogs'	
1995	Drifting School	Police #1	
1996	Spy Hard	Thug #1	
1996	The Trigger Effect	Security Guard	
1996	The Undercover Kid	Terrorist #2	
1996	The Assault	Lou	
1997	Con Air	Con #1	
1997	Executive Power	Thug	Direct-to-video
1999	BitterSweet	'Puss'	Direct-to-video
1999	The Limey	Warehouse Thug	
1999	Fight Club	Lou's Body Guard	
2000	Traffic	Ruiz's Assistant	
2003	National Security	Stanton	
2003	Wonderland	Hit Man #1	Uncredited
2004	The Whole Ten Yards	Goon #1	
2005	Guess Who	Traffic Cop	
2006	Stump the Band	Guido	
2008	This Life	Man	
2009	From Mexico with Love	Jake	
2009	The Grind	The Punisher	
2009	Wrong Turn at Tahoe	Thug 3	
2011	3 Musketeers	Agent Flowers	Direct-to-video
2012	The Misadventures of the Dunderheads	Pink Suit Gambler	
2013	Out of the Furnace	Man At Drive In	
2014	The Extendables	A.D.	
2014	Mercenaries	Driver	
2014	Chasing the Past	Zach's Boss (voice)	Short film
2015	Pontiac Angel	John Yoder	Short film
2016	Surge of Power: Revenge of the Sequel	Diamond	
2019	American Bistro	Man #1	

Television roles
Year	Title	Role	Note
1980	The Incredible Hulk	Biker	Season 3: episode 15: "Long Run Home" uncredited
1980	The Incredible Hulk	Swingtime Patron	Season 4: episode 4: "Dark Side" uncredited
1981	The Incredible Hulk	Brad's friend	Season 4: episode 13: "The First: Part 2" uncredited
1984	The Fall Guy	Unknown	Episode: "Baja 1000"
1985	Scarecrow and Mrs. King	Henchman #1	Episode: "A Relative Situation"
1985	Shadow Chasers	Thompson	Episode: "Parts Unknown"
1986	Magnum, P.I.	Scott, Second Hitman	Episode: "Summer School"
1986	Misfits of Science	Joe	Episode: "The Avenging Angel"
1986	The New Mike Hammer	Reed	Episode: "Mike's Baby"
1986	MacGyver	Gorman	Episode: "Silent World"
1987	Blood Vows: The Story of a Mafia Wife	Unknown	TV movie
1987	1st & Ten	Mark	Episode: "The Bulls Change Hands"
1987	The Golden Girls	Black Crow	Episode: "The Housekeeper"
1987	Sledge Hammer!	Sokolsky	Episode: "Comrade Hammer"
1987	Sledge Hammer!	Man In Restaurant	Episode: "Vertical"; uncredited
1987	Sledge Hammer!	Party Guest	Episode: "Hammer Hits the Rock"
1987	Sledge Hammer!	Unknown	Episode: "Hammeroid"
1988	Beauty and the Beast	Hopkins	Episode: "Temptation"
1988	The Incredible Hulk Returns	Barner	TV movie
1988	Dynasty	Truck Driver	Episode: "Broken Krystle"
1988	Falcon Crest	Fireman #2	Episode: "Dust to Dust"
1989	Nick Knight	Pure Melrose	TV movie
1989	Falcon Crest	Deputy Sheriff #1	Episode: "Charley"
1989	The Nutt House	Sailor #1	Episode: "The Nutt Cracker Suite"
1990	Voices Within: The Lives of Truddi Chase	Colin	TV movie
1990	The New Adam-12	Gunman	Episode: "211 Cabs"
1991	They Came from Outer Space	Bruno	Episode: "Play Doctor"
1991	Jake and the Fatman	Rick	Episode: "Every Time We Say Goodbye"
1992	Married... with Children	Man	Episode: "Rites of Passage"
1992	Step by Step	Ted Davis	Episode: "Stuck on You"
1992	Baywatch	Riggs	Episode: "Princess of Tides"
1992	Red Shoe Diaries	Biker	Episode: "Double or Nothing"
1993	The Fire Next Time	Claude	Miniseries
1993	Walker, Texas Ranger	Gergen	Episode: "End Run"
1994	Babylon 5	Poker Participant	Episode: "The Quality of Mercy"; uncredited
1995	Family Matters	Arm Wrestler	Episode: "The Substitute Son"
1995	Vanishing Son	Unknown	Episode: "Jersey Girl"
1995	The Rockford Files: A Blessing in Disguise	Brother Bob	TV movie
1995	Renegade	Parking Supervisor	Episode: "Another Place and Time"
1995	Walker, Texas Ranger	Sanders	Episode: "On Sacred Ground"
1995	Walker Texas Ranger	Computer Chip Dealer	Episode: "Whitewater Part 1"; uncredited
1996	Dr. Quinn, Medicine Woman	Garrett	Episode: "If You Love Someone..."
1996	Baywatch Nights	Thug #1	Episode: "Thin Blood"
1996	Sisters	Thug #2	Episode: "Dreamcatcher"
1996	Walker, Texas Ranger	Bood Holland	Episode: "Lucky"
1997	Dark Skies	Supervisor	Episode: "The Last Wave"
1997	Melrose Place	Security Guard	Episode: "Screams from a Marriage"
1997	Spy Game	Roth	Episode: "What, Micah Worry?"
1997	Walker, Texas Ranger	Riley	Episode: "A Woman's Place"
1998	Babylon 5	Drazi Vendor	Episode: "Meditations on the Abyss"
1998	Babylon 5: Thirdspace	Bar Patron	TV movie; uncredited
1998	Seven Days	Cadre Member #1	Pilot: Part 1
1998	The Practice	Officer #3	Episode: "Line of Duty"
1999	Sons of Thunder	Cowboy Guy	Episode: "Daddy's Girl"
1999	Walker, Texas Ranger	Murphy	Episode: "Team Cherokee: Part 1"
2000	Walker, Texas Ranger	McKnight	Episode: "Turning Point"
2001	18 Wheels of Justice	Sal Primavera	Episode: "A Family Upside Down"; uncredited
2001	The Practice	Morris	Episode: "Vanished: Part 1"
2002	Alias	Vatican Guard	Episode: "The Prophecy"; uncredited
2002	Charmed	Huntsman	Episode: "Happily Ever After"; uncredited
2002	24	Marshall Goren	Episode: "Day 2: 8:00 a.m.-9:00 a.m."
2003	Return to the Batcave: The Misadventures of Adam and Burt	Slim, The Henchman	TV movie
2003	The Agency	Sammy Banachi	Episode: "Spy Finance"
2004	Monk	First Goon	Episode: "Mr. Monk Meets the Godfather"
2006	The Minor Accomplishments of Jackie Woodman	Gunman	Episode: "Turning Manure Into Soy"
2006	Heroes	Jumpsuit	Episode: "Chapter Two 'Don't Look Back'"
2007	Day Break	Bus Driver	Episode: "What If It's Him?"; uncredited
2007	CSI: Crime Scene Investigation	Hank Connors	Episode: "Leapin' Lizards"
2010	The Forgotten	Eric Boden	Episode: "Patient John"
2011	Mega Python vs. Gatoroid	Billy	TV movie
2011	CSI: NY	Carlo	Episode: "Party Down"
2011	The Mentalist	Officer #1	Episode: "Strawberries and Cream: Part 1"
2011	The Whole Truth	Rikers Guard	Episode: "The End"
2013	Cleaners	'Scarface'	Episode: "It's a Classic"
2014	Extant	Service Truck Driver	Episode: "A Pack of Cards"
2015	Community	Cook #2	Episode: "Modern Espionage"
2015	Ominous	Cook	TV movie
2016	The GPS Zone	Randy	TV movie
2020	Shoot from the Hip	The Cooler	Episode: "Rage of the Phantom"

Video game role
Year	Title	Role
1993	Ground Zero: Texas	Card Player #2
