= Cyborg 3: The Recycler =

- Official DVD cover
- Directed by: Michael Schroeder
- Written by: Barry Victor; Troy Bolotnick; Straw Weisman
- Produced by: Diane Mehrez; Gary Jude Burkart; Steve Rockmael; Alexander Tabrizi
- Starring: Khrystyne Haje; Zach Galligan; Malcolm McDowell; Michael Bailey Smith; Rebecca Ferratti
- Cinematography: Phil Parmet
- Edited by: Barry Zetlin
- Music by: Kim Bullard; Julian Raymond
- Distributed by: Prism Leisure Corporation; Warner Vision Entertainment
- Release date: December 19, 1995
- Running time: 90 minutes
- Country: United States
- Language: English

Cyborg 3: The Recycler is a 1994 American direct-to-video film and is sequel to Cyborg 2 (1993) starring Malcolm McDowell and Khrystyne Haje. Released on home video in 1995, the film is directed by Michael Schroeder. It is the third installment in the Cyborg film series.

== Plot ==
The film is set in a desolate post-apocalyptic world where a once–thriving age of man and cyborgs has come to an end. Cyborgs are now hunted for their parts. Cash (Haje), a female cyborg learns from Doc Edford (Margaret Avery) that she is somehow pregnant.

She searches for the fabled city of Cytown to find Evans (Zach Galligan), a creator of cyborgs, to find out more about her condition. She is followed by Anton Lewellyn (Richard Lynch) and his assistant Jocko (Andrew Bryniarski). Lewellyn is able to sustain himself by hunting cyborgs for their parts. Though he has long wanted to find Cytown (the last haven for cyborgs), he becomes obsessed in getting Cash and her child.

== Cast ==
- Malcolm McDowell as Lord Talon
- Khrystyne Haje as Casella "Cash" Reese Cyborg
- Zach Galligan as Evans
- Richard Lynch as Anton Lewellyn
- Andrew Bryniarski as Jocko Cyborg
- Michael Bailey Smith as Donovan Cyborg
- William Katt as Decaf Cyborg
- Rebecca Ferratti as Elexia Cyborg
- Margaret Avery as Dr. Edford
- Raye Hollitt as Finola Cyborg
- Kato Kaelin as Beggar
- Evan Lurie as El-Sid Cyborg
- Bill Quinn as Hale Cyborg
- David McSwain as Ahab Cyborg
