= NightCaster II: Equinox =

2002 video game

- Developer: Jaleco
- Publisher: Jaleco
- Platform: Xbox
- Release: December 2002
- Genre: Action role-playing
- Modes: Single-player, multiplayer

NightCaster II: Equinox is a third-person, action role-playing game (RPG) for the Xbox, that was developed and published by Jaleco. It is the direct sequel to NightCaster.

== Gameplay ==
NightCaster II features a unique dual analog control system that lets a player manoeuvre their character in one direction while accurately aiming spells in another direction. It also features two-player cooperative gameplay where players can battle armies of enemies, made up of 35 different creatures, using melee attacks and more than 32 spells from four elementally opposed schools of magic: Fire & Water, and Dark & Light.

== Reception ==
Reception

Aggregate score
Aggregator	Score
Metacritic	46/100

Review scores
Publication	Score
AllGame	2/5
Game Informer	5.75/10
GamePro	3.5/5
GamesMaster	47%
GameSpot	1.9/10
GameZone	4.6/10
IGN	3.7/10
Official Xbox Magazine (UK)	4.5/10
Official Xbox Magazine (US)	7.9/10
X-Play	1/5

NightCaster II: Equinox received "generally unfavorable reviews" according to the review aggregation website Metacritic. Matthew Gallant of GameSpot called it "a big step backward for the series in just about every respect."
