= The Fantastic Four (unreleased film) =

Unreleased film

- Theatrical release poster
- Directed by: Oley Sassone
- Screenplay by: Craig J. Nevius; Kevin Rock
- Based on: Fantastic Four by: Stan Lee; Jack Kirby
- Produced by: Steven Rabiner
- Starring: Alex Hyde-White; Jay Underwood; Rebecca Staab; Michael Bailey Smith; Carl Ciarfalio; Ian Trigger; Joseph Culp; Kat Green; George Gaynes
- Cinematography: Mark Parry
- Edited by: Glenn Garland
- Music by: David Wurst; Eric Wurst
- Production companies: Constantin Film; New Concorde
- Release dates: May 31, 1994 (announced, later pulled)
- Running time: 90 minutes
- Countries: United States; Germany
- Language: English
- Budget: $1 million

The Fantastic Four is an unreleased 1994 American superhero film based on the Marvel Comics characters, created by Stan Lee and Jack Kirby with principal photography taken place in 1992. The film features the team's origin and first battle with Doctor Doom. Executive-produced by low-budget specialist Roger Corman and Constantin Film president Bernd Eichinger, it was made to allow Eichinger to keep the Fantastic Four film rights. It was not officially released, although pirated copies have circulated since 1994, as well as various clips being available online.

== Plot ==
Reed Richards and Victor Von Doom are college friends who use the opportunity of a passing comet called Colossus to try an experiment. It goes horribly wrong, leaving Victor believed dead. Susan and Johnny Storm are two children living with their mother, who owns a boarding house where Reed lives. Ben Grimm is a family friend and a college buddy of Reed's.

Ten years later, Reed, Susan, Johnny, and Ben participate in a mission in an experimental spacecraft of Reed's as the same comet passes Earth. Unbeknownst to them, a crucial diamond component designed to protect them from the comet's cosmic rays has been replaced with an imitation by a criminal named The Jeweler, leaving them exposed to the radiation.

After crash-landing on Earth, they discover that the cosmic rays have given them special powers: Reed's bodily structure has become elastic, Susan can become invisible, Johnny can generate fire on demand, and Ben has transformed into a creature with stone-like skin.

They are later captured by men posing as Marines and are taken to Victor, who has become the villainous monarch Dr. Doom. They escape and meet at the Baxter Building, trying to decide how to move forward with their superpowers. An angry Ben leaves them to go out on his own, feeling he has become a freak. He is found by homeless men and joins them in the lair of the Jeweler.

The Jeweler has his henchmen kidnap blind artist Alicia Masters, whom he plans to force into being his bride, intending to use the stolen diamond as his wedding gift to her. Doom, who has his own plans for the diamond, sends his henchmen to The Jeweler to make a deal for it, but to no avail. Doom seizes the diamond himself, and a gun battle breaks out between his men and the Jeweler's. When Ben enters the fray, Doom takes Alicia hostage. When Ben threatens to "clobber" Doom, Alicia begs him not to risk it and confesses her love for him. Her confession changes Ben back to human form, and he flees into the city streets. Frustrated at his helplessness, he reverts to the Thing.

When Ben returns to his friends, Reed has learned that Doom is actually Victor. Doom contacts them and threatens to use the diamond to power a laser cannon that will destroy New York City unless they surrender to him. Realizing they are the only ones who can stop him, they don costumes and travel to Doom's castle, where they confront waves of his military forces. As Reed battles him, Doom manages to fire his laser but is knocked off a balcony wall. As he clings to the wall, Reed tries to rescue him, but Doom's gauntlet comes loose, and he falls into the fog below. His gauntlet (still on the balcony) starts to move on its own. Meanwhile, Johnny has become the Human Torch and flies off to intercept the laser's shot, deflecting away from the city and into outer space. Ben frees Alicia and finally introduces himself to her. She feels the rocky surface of his face but is not fazed by his altered appearance. The Fantastic Four dedicate themselves to fighting evil, and Reed and Susan marry.

== Cast ==
- Alex Hyde-White as Reed Richards / Mr. Fantastic
- Rebecca Staab as Susan Storm / Invisible Woman
  - Mercedes McNab as young Susan
- Jay Underwood as Johnny Storm / Human Torch
  - Phillip Van Dyke as young Johnny
- Michael Bailey Smith as Ben Grimm
  - Carl Ciarfalio as The Thing
- Joseph Culp as Victor Von Doom / Dr. Doom
- Kat Green as Alicia Masters
- Ian Trigger as The Jeweler
- Chuck Butto as Weasel
- Howard Shangraw as Kragstadt
- David Keith Miller as Trigorin
- Robert Alan Beuth as Dr. Hauptman
- Annie Gagen as May Storm

== Production ==
In 1983, German producer Bernd Eichinger met with Marvel Comics' Stan Lee at Lee's Los Angeles home to explore obtaining an option for a movie based on the Fantastic Four. The option was not available until three years later, when Eichinger's production company Constantin Film obtained it for a price the producer called "not enormous" and which has been estimated to be $250,000. Despite some interest from Warner Bros. Pictures and Columbia Pictures, budget concerns precluded any production, and with the option scheduled to expire on December 31, 1992, Constantin asked Marvel for an extension. With none forthcoming, Eichinger planned to retain his option by producing a low-budget Fantastic Four film. In September 1992, he teamed with B-movie specialist Roger Corman, who agreed to produce the film on a $1 million budget, to be released by his distribution company New Horizons Pictures. Director Oley Sassone claimed the budget may have been closer to $750,000.

Principal photography began on December 28, 1992, under the direction of music video director Oley Sassone, lasting for between 21 and 25 days

Storyboards were drawn by artist Pete Von Sholly. The movie was shot on the Concorde Pictures sound stage in Venice, California, as well as in Agoura, California for a spacecraft-crash scene, the Loyola Marymount University campus for a lab-explosion scene, and the former Pacific Stock Exchange building in downtown Los Angeles for team-meeting scenes.

Costume designer Réve Richards recalled in 1993 going to Golden Apple Comics on Melrose Avenue in Los Angeles to buy Fantastic Four comic books for research. Upon explaining his task, "these people in the store just swarmed me and said, 'You are going to be faithful to it?' And I told them, 'This is why I am buying these books.'" Paul Ahern was hired as weapons consultant, and Scott Billups for computer visual effects. The special-effects makeup was by John Vulich and Everett Burrell of Optic Nerve. Stuntman Carl Ciarfalio, who wore a rubber suit to portray the monstrous superhero Thing, worked with actor Michael Bailey Smith, who played the Thing's human self, Ben Grimm, so that their mannerisms would match. During the months of post-production, music composers David and Eric Wurst personally contributed $6,000 to finance a 48-piece orchestra for the soundtrack.

== Marketing and release plans ==
A 1993 magazine article gave a tentative release date of Labor Day weekend 1993. During that summer, trailers ran in theaters and on the video release of Corman's Carnosaur and Little Miss Millions. The cast members hired a publicist, at their own expense, to help promote the film at a clips screening at the Shrine Auditorium in Los Angeles and at San Diego Comic-Con, and the film appeared as a cover story on an issue of Film Threat magazine. By this time, the world premiere was announced to take place at the Mall of America in Bloomington, Minnesota, on January 19, 1994, with proceeds from the event earmarked for the charities Ronald McDonald House and Children's Miracle Network.

Suddenly, the premiere was halted, the actors received a cease and desist order on all promotion from the producers, and the studio confiscated the negatives. Eichinger then informed Sassone that the film would not be released. Speculation arose that the film had never been intended for release, but had gone into production solely as a way for Eichinger to retain rights to the characters; Stan Lee said in 2005 that this was indeed the case, insisting that the movie "was never supposed to be shown to anybody," and adding that the cast and crew had been left unaware. Corman dismissed Lee's claims, stating "We had a contract to release it, and I had to be bought out of that contract [by Eichinger]". Eichinger called Lee's version of events "definitely not true. It was not our [original] intention to make a B movie, that's for sure, but when the movie was there, we wanted to release it." He said that Avi Arad, then a Marvel executive, "calls me up and says, 'Listen, I think what you did was great, it shows your enthusiasm for the movie and the property, and ... I understand that you have invested so-and-much, and Roger has invested so-and-much. Let's do a deal.' Because he really didn't like the idea that a small movie was coming out and maybe ruining the franchise.... So he says to me that he wants to give me back the money that we spent on the movie and that we should not release it."

Arad recalled in 2002 that while on a trip to Puerto Rico in 1993, a fan noticing Arad's Fantastic Four shirt expressed excitement over the film's upcoming premiere, of which Arad said he was unaware. Concerned how the low-budget film might cheapen the brand, he said he purchased the film "for a couple of million dollars in cash" and, not having seen it, ordered all prints destroyed to prevent its release.

Although never officially released to the general public, The Fantastic Four has been subject to bootleg recordings, which had been made available online for free.

== Reception ==
On the review aggregator website Rotten Tomatoes, 31% of 13 critics' reviews are positive, with an average rating of 4.1/10. Clint Morris of Film Threat magazine said of a copy of the film he obtained, "[Y]es it's terribly low-budget and yes it's derisorily campy and feebly performed, but at the same time there's also something inquiringly irresistible about this B comic tale that makes you wonder why it didn't get a release somewhere along the line. Even if it does resemble Toxic Avenger [more] than, say, Spider-Man ... The script isn't actually all that bad, and some of the actors—notably Michael Bailey Smith—are actually quite good here, and with an extra polish, I think they might have been able to release this thing." Neil Calloway of Flickering Myth said "the production values are of a 1990s daytime soap, with some rather clunky dialogue."

== Aftermath ==
Eichinger continued negotiations to produce a big-budget adaptation, speaking with directors including Chris Columbus, Peyton Reed, and Peter Segal. After pre-production briefly went underway in 1996, Eichinger and his company began production in 2004 of Fantastic Four, released by 20th Century Fox in 2005, with an estimated $90 million budget, and released to commercial success despite negative reception. Following that film's 2005 release, Eichinger and Constantin produced a $130 million sequel, Fantastic Four: Rise of the Silver Surfer in 2007, to both critical and commercial disappointment.

A critically panned reboot for the franchise, named Fantastic Four, was released by 20th Century Fox in 2015. The Walt Disney Company, through its acquisition of 20th Century Fox's owner 21st Century Fox in 2019, made Marvel regain the film rights to the Fantastic Four. Joseph Culp, who portrayed Doctor Doom in the unreleased film, released a petition on Change.org in February 2024 in an attempt to have the film released by Marvel Studios.

Marvel Studios subsequently produced a second reboot set in the Marvel Cinematic Universe (MCU), entitled The Fantastic Four: First Steps in 2025, to positive critical reception and box office success. The four principal actors of the 1994 film – Alex Hyde-White, Rebecca Staab, Jay Underwood, and Michael Bailey Smith – all made cameo appearances in that film.

== Documentary film ==
A documentary about the film was released on July 10, 2015. Titled Doomed!: The Untold Story of Roger Corman's The Fantastic Four, it featured interviews with Corman and others in the cast and crew explaining what transpired with the film and its production.
