= Fantastic Four (2005 film) =

2005 film by Tim Story

- Theatrical release poster
- Directed by: Tim Story
- Written by: Mark Frost; Michael France
- Based on: Fantastic Four by: Stan Lee; Jack Kirby
- Produced by: Avi Arad; Ralph Winter; Bernd Eichinger
- Starring: Ioan Gruffudd; Jessica Alba; Chris Evans; Michael Chiklis; Julian McMahon; Kerry Washington
- Cinematography: Oliver Wood
- Edited by: William Hoy
- Music by: John Ottman
- Production companies: 20th Century Fox; Constantin Film; Marvel Enterprises, Inc.; 1492 Pictures
- Distributed by: 20th Century Fox (Worldwide); Constantin Film (Germany)
- Release date: July 8, 2005
- Running time: 106 minutes
- Countries: Germany; United States
- Language: English
- Budget: $87.5—100 million
- Box office: $333.5 million

Fantastic Four (sometimes stylized as Fantastic 4) is a 2005 superhero film based on the Marvel Comics superhero team created by Stan Lee and Jack Kirby. It was directed by Tim Story and written by Mark Frost and Michael France. The film stars Ioan Gruffudd, Jessica Alba, Chris Evans, Michael Chiklis, Julian McMahon, and Kerry Washington. The film follows the origins of the titular team as they learn to come to terms with their newfound abilities following their exposure to cosmic rays in space.

This was the second live-action Fantastic Four film to be produced. A previous attempt, titled The Fantastic Four, was a B movie produced by Roger Corman that ultimately went unreleased. Fantastic Four was released in the United States on July 8, 2005, by 20th Century Fox. The film received generally mixed reviews from critics; it grossed $333.5 million worldwide, and has gone through some re-evaluation over the years after its release. A sequel, Fantastic Four: Rise of the Silver Surfer, was released in 2007. A reboot was released in 2015, while another, set in the Marvel Cinematic Universe (MCU), was released in 2025. Evans, who would later portray Captain America in the MCU, reprised his role as Johnny Storm / Human Torch in the MCU film Deadpool & Wolverine (2024).

== Plot ==
Dr. Reed Richards, along with his friend, Ben Grimm, convinces Dr. Victor von Doom, CEO of Von Doom Industries, to allow him access to his space station to test the effects of exposure to clouds of cosmic energy on biological samples. Victor agrees and recruits his chief genetics researcher (and Reed's ex-girlfriend) Susan Storm and her reckless brother Johnny Storm.

They arrive in space to study the cosmic clouds, but the clouds arrive ahead of schedule. Reed, Susan, and Johnny leave the shielded station to rescue Ben, who is out on a spacewalk to place the samples, while Victor closes the shields behind them to protect himself. The storm breaks through the station and strikes the four. They return home but soon begin to develop strange powers: Reed can stretch like rubber, Susan can become invisible and create force fields, Johnny can engulf himself in fire, and Ben becomes a large, rock-based orange creature with superhuman strength and durability. Victor, meanwhile, faces backlash from his stockholders over publicity surrounding the failed mission.

On the Brooklyn Bridge, Ben accidentally causes a traffic pile-up while stopping a man from committing suicide. The four use their powers to contain the damage and save lives. While the public cheers them for their efforts, Debbie (Ben's fiancée) arrives to silently end their engagement, unable to accept him for his condition. Reed vows to a heartbroken Ben to reverse the effects. The media dubs them "The Fantastic Four," and Victor exploits the news story to his stockholders, but they decide to pull out of Von Doom Industries. The four move into Reed's lab in the Baxter Building to study their abilities and work on finding a cure. Victor offers his support in their efforts but blames Reed for the mission's failure.

Reed plans to construct a machine to re-create the storm and reverse their conditions. However, Johnny refuses to cooperate, insisting they should just embrace their powers and naming them the "Human Torch" (himself), the "Invisible Woman" (Sue), "Mr. Fantastic" (Reed), and "the Thing" (Ben). Meanwhile, Victor, also affected by the storm due to the shields' malfunction, begins mutating into organic metal capable of producing electricity, and plots to use his new powers to take revenge.

Victor drives a wedge between Ben and Reed, prompting Ben to walk out in a rage. This motivates Reed to attempt the machine on himself, but he cannot generate enough power to push the storm to critical mass. Victor hears this and brings Ben to the lab. Ben is placed in the machine, and Victor uses his abilities to produce the electricity needed to power it, turning Ben back to normal and accelerating Victor's condition, causing much of his body to turn to metal. Victor knocks the human Ben unconscious and kidnaps Reed.

Victor, now calling himself "Doom," tortures Reed using a super-cooling unit and fires a heat-seeking missile at the Baxter Building to kill Johnny. He flies through the city to evade it, lighting a garbage barge on fire to trick it. Sue rushes to free Reed and battles Doom, but is outmatched. Ben arrives to help, having transformed himself back into the Thing by reusing the machine. The battle spills into the streets, and the four assemble to battle Doom. Johnny and Sue combine their powers to wrap Doom in an inferno of intense flames, and Ben and Reed douse him with cold water, inducing thermal shock and freezing Doom in place.

In an epilogue, Ben tells Reed to forget about his experiment with the machine, as he has accepted his condition through his relationship with Alicia Masters, a blind artist. The team decides to embrace their roles as superheroes, and Reed proposes to Sue. Meanwhile, a frozen Doom is transported back to his homeland of Latveria.

== Cast ==
- Ioan Gruffudd as Reed Richards
- Jessica Alba as Sue Storm
- Chris Evans as Johnny Storm
- Michael Chiklis as Ben Grimm
- Julian McMahon as Victor von Doom
- Hamish Linklater as Leonard
- Kerry Washington as Alicia Masters
- Laurie Holden as Debbie McIlvane
- Kevin McNulty as Jimmy O'Hoolihan
- Maria Menounos as Sexy Nurse
- Michael Kopsa as Ned Cecil
- Stan Lee as Willie Lumpkin

As in almost all of the previous Marvel Comics-based films, Fantastic Four co-creator Stan Lee makes a cameo appearance, this time as Willie Lumpkin, the postal worker who greets the team on their way to the Baxter Building elevator. Hugh Jackman reprises his role as James Howlett / Logan / Wolverine from the X-Men film series in a scene in which Reed Richards changes his face to resemble Jackman's portrayal of Wolverine in an attempt to woo Susan Storm; the scene was deleted from the theatrical cut of Fantastic Four and was restored in the "Extended Cut" of the film. Canadian broadcasters Terry David Mulligan and Ben Mulroney, and American broadcaster Lauren Sánchez make cameos as reporters. Cameos during the X Games scenes include professional freestyle motocross riders Kenny Bartram and Brian Deegan, and reporter Jamie Little. David Parker and Pascale Hutton (the latter only appears in the extended version of the film) appeared as Ernie and Nightclub Girlfriend, respectively

== Production ==
In 1983, German producer Bernd Eichinger met with Stan Lee at his home in Los Angeles to explore obtaining an option for a movie based on the Fantastic Four. The option was not available until three years later, when Eichinger's Constantin Film company obtained it from Marvel Comics for a price the producer called "not enormous", and which has been estimated to be $250,000. Warner Bros. and Columbia Pictures showed interest, but were cautious of Eichinger's $40–45 million budget. With the option scheduled to expire on December 31, 1992, Eichinger asked Marvel for an extension. With none forthcoming, Eichinger planned to retain his option by producing a low-budget Fantastic Four film, reasoning, he said in 2005, "They didn't say I had to make a big movie." In 1992, he approached B-movie director and producer Roger Corman on the idea of producing the film on a $5 million budget to keep the rights, which he eventually decided to bring down to $1 million. In 1994, the adaptation, titled The Fantastic Four had its trailer released to cinemas, and its cast and director went on a promotional tour, however the film was not officially released. The film was accused of being an ashcan copy, meaning it was only made to keep the license. Lee and Eichinger stated that the actors had no idea of the situation, instead believing they were creating a proper release. Marvel Comics, along with Avi Arad and close friend Ralph Winter, paid in exchange for the film's negative, so 20th Century Fox could go ahead with the big-budget adaptation, as well as a possible spin-off film starring the Silver Surfer for summer 1998.

Fox hired Chris Columbus to write and direct Fantastic Four in 1995. He developed a screenplay with Michael France, but decided to step down as director and focus on producing Fantastic Four under his 1492 Pictures company. In 2025, he revealed he was actually fired from the project after telling the executives to make the movie using conceptual art based on Jack Kirby and Marvel's Silver Age. Peter Segal was hired to direct in April 1997, and was replaced by Sam Weisman by the end of the year. Fox brought in Sam Hamm to rewrite the script in April 1998 in an attempt to lower the $165 million projected budget. In February 1999, with development taking longer than expected, Eichinger and Fox signed a deal with Marvel to extend the control of the film rights for another two years, with a summer 2001 release planned, and hiring Raja Gosnell to direct. However, Gosnell decided to do Scooby-Doo (2002) instead and dropped out in October 2000.

In April 2001, Peyton Reed signed on to direct Fantastic Four, and Mark Frost was brought on board for another rewrite. Reed departed the project in July 2003, explaining in 2015, "I developed it for the better part of a year with three different sets of writers. But it became clear after a while that Fox had a very different movie in mind and they were also chasing a release date ... so we ended up parting company." Reed's version was described as being influenced by A Hard Day's Night (1964). Reed would later reuse his ideas for the film for the Marvel Cinematic Universe (MCU) film Ant-Man and the Wasp: Quantumania (2023). Mads Mikkelsen auditioned for Reed Richards / Mr. Fantastic, but Ioan Gruffudd was cast instead; he recalled his audition as "humiliating". Andrew Walker auditioned for the role of Johnny Storm, which eventually went to Chris Evans. Other actors joined the film; Jessica Alba as Sue Storm / Invisible Woman, Michael Chiklis as Ben Grimm / The Thing (who was portrayed entirely through practical effects rather than CGI by the actor's own insistence) and Julian McMahon as Dr. Victor von Doom. Sean Astin was one of the candidates to direct the movie, his reasoning for wanting to direct it, despite never having directed a feature before and not being familiar with the comics, was that he wanted to step up in filmmaking and felt that doing a Fantastic Four film would allow him to leave a mark. Despite not getting the job, Tom Rothman was impressed with his determination and hoped to work with him on a future project. Robert Downey Jr. was initially considered for the role of Doom; he would later be cast as the character in the MCU where he appeared in The Fantastic Four: First Steps in July 2025. Astin wanted to cast Christina Aguilera and Michael Chiklis to portray Sue Storm and The Thing respectively, while he approached Cameron Diaz for Sue, but she declined as she did not want to wear superhero makeup.

Tim Story was signed to direct in April 2004, after Fox was impressed with his early cut of Taxi (2004) and him being a fan of the comics. Simon Kinberg wrote uncredited drafts of the script. After seeing The Incredibles (2004), Story decided to make significant script changes and add more special effects to avoid similarities.

In 2025, Alba stated that she felt humiliated when she filmed a nude scene for the film.

== Music ==
Professional ratings
Review scores
Source	Rating
IGN	6.9/10
Allmusic	2/5 stars

Fantastic 4: The Album is the official soundtrack to the movie Fantastic Four. The soundtrack features two supergroups that were formed specifically for the album: Loser (former Marilyn Manson guitarist/writer John 5) and T.F.F. (featuring Brody Dalle of The Distillers, Chris Cester of Jet, Nick Zinner of The Yeah Yeah Yeahs, and Dolf de Datsun of the Datsuns).

No.	Title	Writer(s)	Producer(s)	Length
1.	"Come On, Come In" (Velvet Revolver)	Scott Weiland; Slash; Duff McKagan; Matt Sorum; Dave Kushner	Doug Grean; Nick Raskulinecz; Velvet Revolver	3:58
2.	"Error Operator" (Taking Back Sunday)	Taking Back Sunday	Ariel Rechtshaid	3:09
3.	"Relax" (Chingy)	Howard Bailey; Kwamé B. Holland	K1 Mil	3:31
4.	"What Ever Happened to the Heroes" (Joss Stone)	Alecia Moore; Billy Mann; Christopher Rojas	Beau Dozier	3:56
5.	"Waiting (Save Your Life)" (Omnisoul)	Derek A.E. Fuhrmann	Gregg Wattenberg	4:02
6.	"Always Come Back to You" (Ryan Cabrera)	Ryan Cabrera; Guy Chambers	Guy Chambers	3:33
7.	"Everything Burns" (Ben Moody featuring Anastacia)	Ben Moody	Ben Moody; Jay Baumgardner	3:41
8.	"New World Symphony" (Miri Ben-Ari featuring Pharoahe Monch)	Miri Ben-Ari; Kanye West; Troy Jamerson	Miri Ben-Ari; Kanye West	4:01
9.	"Die for You (Fantastic Four Mix)" (Megan McCauley)	Megan McCauley; Bob Marlette	Bob Marlette	3:49
10.	"Noots" (Sum 41)	Deryck Whibley; Greig Nori	Greig Nori	3:49
11.	"Surrender" (Simple Plan)	Rick Nielsen	Simple Plan	2:58
12.	"I'll Take You Down" (T.F.F)	Brody Dalle; Josh Deutsch; Andrew Wyatt	Josh Deutsch	2:50
13.	"On Fire" (Lloyd Banks)	Holland; Christopher Lloyd; Curtis Jackson; Harry Palmer; Marshall Mathers; Luis Resto	K1 Mil; Eminem (co.); Luis Resto (add.)	3:07
14.	"Reverie" (Megan McCauley)	McCauley; Will Baker; Pete Woodruff	Will Baker; Pete Woodruff	3:55
15.	"Goodbye to You" (Breaking Point)	Justin Rimer; Brett Erikson; Ben Schigel	Ben Schigel	3:51
16.	"Shed My Skin" (Alter Bridge)	Mark Tremonti	Ben Grosse; Alter Bridge (co.)	5:08
17.	"In Due Time" (Submersed)	Donald Carpenter; TJ Davis; Eric Friedman; Kelan Luker; Don Gilmore	Don Gilmore	4:04
18.	"Disposable Sunshine" (Loser)	John 5; Joe Grah; Marlette	Bob Marlette	3:27
19.	"Now You Know" (Miss Eighty 6 featuring Classic)	Ali Theodore; Zach Danziger; Sarai Howard	Ali Dee; Zach Danziger	3:03
20.	"Kirikirimai (Fantastic Four Remix)" (Orange Range)	Orange Range	Josh Deutsch	3:14

An album of John Ottman's score was released by Varèse Sarabande on July 12, 2005.

Additionally, Gabin's song "Bang Bang to the Rock n' Roll" was featured in the film, but not used on the soundtrack.

== Release ==
=== Marketing ===
The teaser trailer was shown at screenings of Elektra, debuting on January 14, 2005. A new trailer was released on May 19, 2005, in front of Star Wars: Episode III – Revenge of the Sith. The American premiere of Fantastic Four was moved from July 1, 2005, to the week of July 8 to avoid competition with Steven Spielberg's film War of the Worlds, during its first week. Fantastic Four opened in 3,602 movie theaters in the United States, and increased to 3,619 theaters in the following week.

=== Home media ===
The main version of Fantastic Four on VHS and DVD was released on December 6, 2005. Included in the Special Features is a preview for the 2006 film X-Men: The Last Stand.

This version had some changes from the one shown in cinemas. Some of these changes included the following:

- There is a scene where Reed and Susan are in a storage room of the Baxter Building. On one of the shelves is a robot that is supposed to be H.E.R.B.I.E. from the Fantastic Four animated cartoon series from 1978.
- The biggest change is in the scene with Jessica Alba and Ioan Gruffudd's characters looking toward the Statue of Liberty. Similar lines are used in the DVD version, but the version on DVD replaces that with the pair in the planetarium, where they discuss their feelings for each other. Instead of Reed forming a square jaw, as he does in the theatrical version, he makes his skin look like that of Wolverine from the X-Men comics. Actor Gruffudd breaks the fourth wall and looks directly at the camera as he does this. This scene was created in hopes of creating a shared cinematic universe between this film, Fox's X-Men, and Sony's Spider-Man. Wolverine was also set to appear in a cameo in Spider-Man 2. The extended cut includes this as part of the movie, along with a longer version of the scene in the planetarium.

The movie was also released on VHS the same day. It was later released on Blu-ray on November 14, 2006.

=== Extended Edition ===
In June 2007, an extended cut DVD of Fantastic Four was released. It incorporated about 20 minutes of deleted scenes, and also included a preview of the sequel, Fantastic Four: Rise of the Silver Surfer. The DVD expanded on The Thing's relationships with Alicia Masters, Doom's scheming to break up the group, and the Human Torch's womanizing backfiring on him.

== Reception ==
=== Box office ===
Fantastic Four finished at the top position at the box office with $56.1 million from 3,602 cinemas over its first weekend. By the end of 2005, Fantastic Four had accumulated a gross income of $330.6 million, with $154.7 million of this coming in the United States. It was the highest-grossing superhero movie by an African-American director until Ryan Coogler's Black Panther (2018).

=== Critical response ===
On the review aggregator website Rotten Tomatoes, 28% of 213 critics' reviews are positive, with an average rating of 4.6/10. The website's consensus reads: "Marred by goofy attempts at wit, subpar acting, and bland storytelling, Fantastic Four is a mediocre attempt to bring Marvel's oldest hero team to the big screen." Metacritic, which uses a weighted average, assigned the film a score of 40 out of 100, based on 35 critics, indicating "mixed or average" reviews. Audiences polled by CinemaScore gave the film an average grade of "B" on an A+ to F scale.

Stephen Hunter of The Washington Post noted that it was "a movie more based on character than plot" and "mostly an origins tale". He called it "a funky, fun film version of the famous Marvel superhero[s]" but was critical of the last twenty minutes. Joe Leydon of Variety called the film "unpretentious" but also "wildly uneven".

James Berardinelli of ReelViews, having been a fan of the comics, found the film disappointing, writing, "This movie is more like a B-grade comic book adaptation than the A-list production it should have been." Berardinelli praised Chiklis for a standout performance despite being buried in makeup, summarizing: "Fantastic Four has its good points—there are individual scenes that work" and said there are "moments of surprise and excitement ... but the tempo's off, beats are missed, and the production ends up sounding out-of-tune." Entertainment Weekly's Owen Gleiberman described the film as "like something left over from the '60s" and compared it unfavorably to other contemporary films such as Spider-Man 2, Batman Begins, and The Incredibles.

The film has since earned a more positive reevaluation after the failure of the 2015 reboot film.

=== Accolades ===
At the Saturn Awards, Fantastic Four was nominated for Best Science Fiction Film, but lost the trophy to Star Wars: Episode III – Revenge of the Sith (2005). It was given two nominations at the 2006 MTV Movie Awards including Best Hero for Jessica Alba (she lost to Christian Bale for Batman Begins) and Best On-Screen Team for Alba, Michael Chiklis, Chris Evans and Ioan Gruffudd (they lost to Vince Vaughn and Owen Wilson for Wedding Crashers). Alba was nominated for a Razzie Award for Worst Actress for her performances in both this film and Into the Blue, but lost to Jenny McCarthy for Dirty Love. The film won the Stinker Award for Worst Screenplay for a Film Grossing Over $100M.

== Novelization ==
Fantastic Four received a novelization written by popular Marvel Comics writer Peter David, which included several scenes not present in the movie.

== Franchise ==
=== Sequel ===
A sequel, Fantastic Four: Rise of the Silver Surfer, was released on June 15, 2007, with director Tim Story and the cast returning. The film had a slightly improved critical reception but a lower financial gross than its predecessor.

=== Reboot ===
When plans for a third film fell through, 20th Century Fox rebooted the series with 2015's Fantastic Four. The film experienced a worse critical reception than the original films and failed at the box office, leading to the cancellation of a sequel planned for a 2017 release.

=== Marvel Cinematic Universe ===
In 2019, after Disney successfully acquired Fox, the film rights of the Fantastic Four were reverted to Marvel Studios, with plans to integrate the characters, along with the X-Men and Deadpool, into the Marvel Cinematic Universe (MCU). Jon Watts was originally attached to direct, but later stepped down after expressing his desire to take a "break" from superhero films. The Fantastic Four: First Steps was released in the United States on July 25, 2025, as the second film of Phase Six of the MCU. The cast includes Pedro Pascal as Reed Richards, Vanessa Kirby as Sue Storm, Joseph Quinn as Johnny Storm, and Ebon Moss-Bachrach as Ben Grimm.

An alternate universe version of Reed Richards, portrayed by John Krasinski, appears in the 2022 film Doctor Strange in the Multiverse of Madness.

Chris Evans reprised his role as Johnny Storm in the 2024 film Deadpool & Wolverine.

== See also ==
- Fantastic Four (2005 video game)
- Fantastic Four in film
