= Thing (Marvel Comics) =

Marvel Comics superhero

- Thing as seen on the variant cover of Fantastic Four #7 (January 2026). Art by Jack Kirby and Joe Jusko.

Publication information
- Publisher: Marvel Comics
- First appearance: Fantastic Four #1 (November. 1961)
- Created by: Stan Lee (writer); Jack Kirby (artist)

In-story information
- Full name: Benjamin Jacob "Ben" Grimm
- Species: Human mutate
- Team affiliations: Fantastic Four; Avengers; Guardians of the Galaxy; Future Foundation
- Notable aliases: Blackbeard the Pirate; Angrir: Breaker of Souls; Dr. Josiah Verpoorteen; El Morrito
- Abilities: Superhuman strength, stamina, and durability; Immortality

The Thing (Benjamin Jacob "Ben" Grimm) is a superhero appearing in American comic books published by Marvel Comics. He is a founding member of the Fantastic Four. The Thing was created by writer-editor Stan Lee and artist Jack Kirby, and he first appeared in Fantastic Four #1 (cover-dated Nov. 1961). Known for his trademark rocky appearance, he has superhuman strength, a sense of humor, and the battle cry and catchphrase "It's clobberin' time!".

The Thing's personality and background is heavily modeled by Kirby's own background. A key feature throughout his character arc is his struggle to accept his newfound powers and form, an experience which often parallels real-world experiences of disfigured people and those with body dysmorphic disorder. This arc culminates in his returning to his human form before again going back to his mutated form. Eventually, the Thing came to accept his mutated form and found love with the blind sculptor Alicia Masters, with whom he was married and adopted two alien children. He has been depicted as an Ashkenazi Jew.

The Thing has appeared in other notable media, including live-action films, with Michael Bailey Smith and Carl Ciarfalio playing the character in his human and mutated forms respectively in the unreleased film The Fantastic Four, Michael Chiklis in the 2005 Fantastic Four film and its 2007 sequel Fantastic Four: Rise of the Silver Surfer, Jamie Bell in the 2015 reboot, and Ebon Moss-Bachrach in the Marvel Cinematic Universe film The Fantastic Four: First Steps (2025), who will reprise the role in Avengers: Doomsday (2026) and Avengers: Secret Wars (2027).

== Publication history ==
Created by writer-editor Stan Lee and artist Jack Kirby, the character first appeared in The Fantastic Four #1 (Nov. 1961). Although Thing's speech patterns are loosely based on Jimmy Durante, Kirby modeled the character after himself.

In addition to appearing in the Fantastic Four, the Thing has been the star of Marvel Two-in-One, Strange Tales (with his fellow Fantastic Four member the Human Torch), and two incarnations of his own eponymous series, as well as numerous miniseries and one-shots.

=== Strange Tales ===
The Thing joined his Fantastic Four partner and frequent rival the Human Torch in Strange Tales #124 (1964), which previously featured solo adventures of the Human Torch and backup Doctor Strange stories. The change was intended to liven the comic through the always humorous chemistry between the Torch and the Thing. They were replaced in #135 (1965) with the "modern-day" version of Nick Fury, Agent of S.H.I.E.L.D., who had already been appearing in Sgt. Fury and his Howling Commandos.

=== Marvel Two-in-One (1974–1983) ===
After a 1973 try-out in two issues of Marvel Feature, the Thing starred in the long-running series Marvel Two-in-One. In each issue, Ben Grimm would team up with another character from the Marvel Universe, often an obscure or colorful character. The series helped to introduce characters from Marvel's lineup, by way of teaming up with the more recognizable Thing. In 1992, Marvel reprinted four Two-in-One stories (#50, 51, 77 and 80) as a miniseries under the title The Adventures of the Thing. The series was cancelled after 100 issues and seven Annuals to make way for a solo series.

=== The Thing (1983–1986) ===
The cancellation of Marvel Two-in-One led to the Thing's first completely solo series, which ran for 36 issues. The Thing was originally written by John Byrne and later, Mike Carlin. The series also featured art by Ron Wilson and later by Paul Neary. It elaborated on Ben Grimm's poor childhood on Yancy Street in its early issues, and chronicled the Thing's later foray into the world of professional wrestling. It also featured a major storyline offshoot from Marvel's Secret Wars event, in which the Thing elects to remain on the Beyonder's Battleworld after discovering that the planet enables him to return to human form at will. A full third of the series' stories take place on Battleworld.

=== 2002–present ===
In 2002, Marvel released The Thing: Freakshow, a four-issue miniseries written by Geoff Johns and illustrated by Scott Kolins, in which the Thing travels across the United States by train, inadvertently stumbling upon a deformed Romanian boy he once ridiculed as a teenager, who is now the super-strong main attraction of a troupe of traveling circus freaks. He later discovers a town full of alien Kree and Skrull warriors fighting over a Watcher infant.

In 2003, Marvel released a four-issue miniseries written by Evan Dorkin and illustrated by Dean Haspiel, The Thing: Night Falls on Yancy Street. The story was more character-driven than the stories that usually feature the Thing. Tom Spurgeon found its outlook on relationships "depressing".

After the success of the 2005 Fantastic Four feature film and events in the comics series that resulted in Grimm becoming a millionaire, the Thing was once again given his own series in 2005, The Thing, written by Dan Slott and penciled by Andrea Di Vito and Kieron Dwyer. It was canceled with issue #8 in 2006.

The Thing was a member of the New Avengers, when that team debuted in their self-titled second series in 2010. He appeared as a regular character throughout the 2010–2013 New Avengers series, from issue #1 (Aug. 2010) through its final issue #34 (Jan. 2013).

The Thing had another solo series in 2021, written by Walter Mosley and illustrated by Tom Reilly, which lasted for six issues. A new limited series, Clobberin' Time, was launched in 2023, written and illustrated by Steve Skroce. The series sees Thing teaming up with various heroes.

== Fictional character biography ==
=== Background ===
Born on Yancy Street in New York City's Lower East Side, to a Jewish family, Benjamin Jacob "Ben" Grimm has an early life of poverty and hardship, shaping him into a tough, streetwise scrapper. His older brother Daniel, whom Ben idolizes, is killed in a street gang fight when Ben is eight years old. This portion of his own life is modeled on that of Jack Kirby, who grew up on tough Delancey Street, whose brother died when he was young, whose father was named Benjamin, and who was named Jacob at birth. Following the death of his parents, Ben is raised by his Uncle Jake (who married a much younger wife, Petunia, who becomes a frequent reference used by the character until her death). He comes to lead the Yancy Street gang at one point.

Excelling in football as a high school student, Ben receives a full scholarship to Empire State University, where he first meets his eventual lifelong friend in a teenaged genius named Reed Richards, as well as future enemy Victor von Doom. Despite their being from radically different backgrounds, science student Richards describes to Grimm his dream of building a space rocket to explore the regions of space around Mars; Grimm jokingly agrees to fly that rocket when the day comes.

The details of his life story have been modified over the decades. Prior to the stories published in the 1970s, Grimm, after earning multiple advanced degrees in engineering, serves in the United States Marine Corps as a test pilot during World War II. These exploits are chronicled to a limited extent in Captain Savage and his Leatherneck Raiders #7. While in the military, Nick Fury sends him, Logan, and Carol Danvers to Vladivostok on a secret surveillance mission. Following this, he becomes an astronaut for NASA, taking part in attempts to reach the Moon, occurring at a time before any crewed spaceship had escaped Earth's gravity.

==== Religion ====
In keeping with an early taboo in the comic superhero world against revealing a character's religion, the fact that Grimm is Jewish was not explicitly revealed until four decades after his creation, in the story "Remembrance of Things Past" in Fantastic Four vol. 3, #56 (Aug. 2002) by Karl Kesel and Stuart Immonen. In this story, Grimm returns to his old neighborhood to find Mr. Sheckerberg, a pawn shop owner he knew as a child. Flashbacks during this story reveal Grimm's Jewish heritage. He recites the Shema, an important and oft-recited Jewish prayer (which, translated to English, begins "Hear, O Israel") over the dying Sheckerberg, who eventually recovers. In a later story, Grimm celebrates his Bar Mitzvah, as it has been 13 years, the age a Jewish boy celebrates his Bar Mitzvah, since he began his "second life" as the Thing. To celebrate the ceremony, he organizes a poker tournament and invites every available superhero.

In the 2004 Fantastic Four story "Hereafter Part 1: A Glimpse of God", the Thing is killed by an energy weapon wielded by Reed Richards, but is resurrected by God.

Out of universe, Jack Kirby featured the Thing on his family's 1976 Hanukkah card.

=== The Thing ===
Some years later, Reed Richards, now a successful scientist, once again makes contact with Grimm. Richards has built his spaceship, and reminds Grimm of his promise to fly it. After the government denies him permission to fly the spaceship himself, Richards plots a clandestine flight piloted by Grimm and accompanied by his future wife Susan Storm, who had helped provide funding for the rocket, and her younger brother Johnny Storm, who helped the group gain access to the launch system. Although reluctant to fly the rocket, Ben is persuaded to do so by Sue, for whom he has a soft spot. During this unauthorized ride into the upper atmosphere of Earth and the Van Allen Belts, they are pelted by a cosmic ray storm and exposed to radiation against which the ship's shields offer no protection. Upon crashing down to Earth, each of the four learn that they have developed fantastic superhuman abilities. Grimm's skin is transformed into a thick, lumpy orange hide, which gradually evolves into his now-familiar craggy covering of large rocky plates. Richards proposes the quartet band together to use their new abilities for the betterment of humanity, and Grimm, in a moment of self-pity, adopts the super-heroic sobriquet, the Thing. The team clashes with the Mole Man in their first appearance.

Trapped in his monstrous form, Grimm is an unhappy yet reliable member of the team. He trusts in his friend Reed Richards to one day develop a cure for his condition. However, when he encounters blind sculptor Alicia Masters, Grimm develops an unconscious resistance to being transformed back to his human form. Subconsciously fearing that Masters prefers him to remain in the monstrous form of the Thing, Grimm's body rejects various attempts by Richards to restore his human form, lest he lose Masters' love. Grimm has remained a stalwart member of the Fantastic Four for years. The Thing first fought the Hulk early in his career, with many such further clashes over the years. Not long after that, he is first reverted to his human form, but is then restored to his Thing form to battle Doctor Doom.

Grimm has been temporarily replaced on the team twice. First, after Grimm temporarily lost his powers and reverted to human form, Reed Richards hired Luke Cage (then using the code name "Power Man") to take his place until Richards had completed a Thing-suit for Ben (however, Ben unexpectedly reverted into the actual Thing again later on).

Years later, after Grimm chose to remain on Battleworld in the aftermath of the "Secret Wars" due to his apparent control over his transformation between his human and mutated states, he asked the She-Hulk to fill in for him. Mister Fantastic did leave him with the device needed to return to Earth when it comes time. The Thing's time on Battleworld lasted until Ben eventually decides to return home after defeating Ultron and slaying his manifested dark side Grimm the Sorcerer. Once he left, the planet had no more reason to exist and so it broke apart.

On returning to Earth, he learns that Alicia had become romantically involved with his teammate Johnny Storm during his absence (it is eventually revealed that this Alicia was the Skrull impostor Lyja). An angry Grimm wallows in self-pity for a time, later on accompanying the West Coast Avengers, and actually joining the team for a while. Eventually, he returns to his surrogate family as leader of the Fantastic Four when Mr. Fantastic and the Invisible Woman leave the team to raise their son Franklin, at which point Ben invites Crystal and Ms. Marvel II (Sharon Ventura) to fill their slots. Soon after Sharon and Ben are irradiated with cosmic rays, Sharon becomes the She-Thing, lumpy much like Ben was in his first few appearances, while Ben mutates into a new rockier, more powerful form.

After being further mutated into the more monstrous rocky form, Ben is briefly changed back to his human form, and returned leadership of the Fantastic Four to Reed Richards. Grimm once more returned to his traditional orange rocky form out of love for Ms. Marvel. He remains a steadfast member of the Fantastic Four.

=== In the 21st century ===
In a Fantastic Four comic published in 2005, Ben learns that he is entitled to a large sum of money, his share of the Fantastic Four fortune, which Reed Richards had never touched, as he had the shares of the other teammates (who were family members) to pay off various debts of the group.

The Thing uses his newfound wealth to build a community center in his old neighborhood on Yancy Street, the "Grimm Youth Center". Thinking the center is named after the Thing himself, the Yancy Street Gang plans to graffiti the building exterior, but discovers the building was actually named after Daniel Grimm, Ben's deceased older brother and former leader of the gang. The relationship between the Yancy Streeters and the Thing is then effectively reconciled, or at least changed to a more good-natured, playful rivalry (as exemplified by the comic ending, with the Yancy Streeters spray-painting the sleeping Thing).

Some personality traits of the cantankerously lovable, occasionally cigar-smoking, Jewish native of the Lower East Side are popularly recognized as having been inspired by those of co-creator Jack Kirby, who in interviews has said he intended Grimm to be an alter ego of himself.

=== Civil War/The Initiative ===
Initially in the 2006 storyline "Civil War", Ben is a reluctant member of the pro-registration side of the controversy over the Superhuman Registration Act (SHRA), until he witnesses a battle on Yancy Street in which Captain America's forces try to rescue captured allies held by Iron Man's forces. The Fantastic Four's foes the Mad Thinker and the Puppet Master try to escalate the battle, using a mind-controlled Yancy Streeter to deliver a bomb. The young man dies and the Thing verbally blasts both sides for not caring about the civilians caught in the conflict. He announces that, while he thinks the registration is wrong, he is also not going to fight the government and is thus leaving the country for France. While in France, he meets Les Héros de Paris ("The Heroes of Paris").

Ben returns to New York as both sides of the SHRA battle in the city. Indifferent to choosing sides, Ben focuses on protecting civilians from harm.

In Fantastic Four #543 (March 2007), Ben celebrates the Fantastic Four's 11th anniversary along with the Human Torch, and latecomers Reed and Sue. The aftermath of the Civil War is still being felt in this issue, as Ben and Johnny (and even Franklin Richards) consider the future of the team and Reed and Sue's marriage. When Reed and Sue arrive near the issue's end, they announce that they are taking a break from the team and have found two replacement members: the Black Panther, and Storm of the X-Men. The title of the story in this issue is a quote from Ben, "Come on, Suzie, don't leave us hangin'."

Ben Grimm served as one of the pallbearers at the memorial service for Captain America, along with Tony Stark, Ms. Marvel, Rick Jones, T'Challa and Sam Wilson.

Ben has been identified as Number 53 of the 142 registered superheroes who appear on the cover of the comic book Avengers: The Initiative #1.

=== "World War Hulk" ===
Ben once again tries to take on the Hulk within the events of the 2007 storyline "World War Hulk" to buy Reed Richards the time he needs to complete his plans for the Hulk. Ben gives his best shots, but the Hulk takes his punches without slowing down. The Hulk proceeds to knock out Ben by punching both sides of his head simultaneously. He is later seen captive in Madison Square Garden, which the Hulk has turned into a gladiatorial arena, with an obedience disk fitted on him.

Released from his imprisonment, Ben, Spider-Man, and Luke Cage attack the Warbound, with Ben fighting Korg. Their battle is brought to an abrupt end when Hiroim repairs the damage to Manhattan Island, drawing energy from Ben and Korg to do so.

=== Secret Invasion ===
In the Secret Invasion: Fantastic Four miniseries, the Skrull Lyja, posing as Sue, sends the Baxter Building, with Ben, Johnny, Franklin, and Valeria Richards inside, into the Negative Zone. Not long after their arrival, Ben has to protect Franklin and Valeria from an impending onslaught of giant insects. With the aid of the Tinkerer, who Ben broke out of the Negative Zone Prison, they, with the exception of Lyja who stayed behind, were able to return to the regular Marvel Universe just after the invasion was over.

=== Heroic Age ===
Following the Siege of Asgard, Luke Cage asks Ben to serve on his New Avengers team. Although Ben states that his loyalty will always be to the Fantastic Four, Cage confirms that he is not asking Ben to resign from his original team, merely suggesting that Ben split his time between the two teams, as Wolverine divides his time between the X-Men and the Avengers.

=== "Fear Itself" ===
During the 2011 "Fear Itself" storyline, Ben lifts one of the seven fallen hammers of the Serpent and becomes Angrir: Breaker of Souls. In this form, he then destroys Yancy Street and Avengers Tower, and battles Spider-Man, Mister Fantastic and Invisible Woman, before confronting Thor, who seriously wounds him. Franklin then uses his powers to restore Ben to his normal self, free from the Serpent's possession.

=== "Original Sin" ===
In the 2014 "Original Sin" storyline, after learning from the eye of the murdered Uatu that Johnny Storm unintentionally sabotaged an experiment that could have allowed Grimm to become human again, Ben is found having apparently murdered the Puppet Master; the crime was committed in a sealed room that even Reed Richards could barely penetrate, with Alicia Masters as the only witness. Although Ben claims innocence, his depression over recent events prompts him to accept incarceration in the Raft. Although power-dampeners in the Raft restrict his strength to a more manageable level, he is attacked by various other thick-skinned superhumans — including the Armadillo and Ironclad — on orders of the current 'boss' of the prison, Sharon Ventura, the She-Thing. Eventually, Ben forms an alliance with the Sandman and manages to escape the prison with the aid of a plan coordinated by the She-Hulk and Ant-Man, allowing him to rejoin Sue and Johnny to investigate Reed's recent abduction, revealing that the dead Puppet Master came from the alternate Earth Franklin had created.

=== Post-Secret Wars ===
As the Fantastic Four disbanded in the aftermath of the "Secret Wars" storyline, the Thing is working with the Guardians of the Galaxy, and the Human Torch is acting as an ambassador with the Inhumans and becoming part of the Uncanny Avengers.

During the 2017 "Secret Empire" storyline, the Thing appears as a member of the Underground, which is a resistance movement against Hydra ever since they took over the United States, until the real Captain America returns, ending Hydra's empires and defeating his Hydra counterpart.

=== Fantastic Four Return ===
To help the Thing cope with Mister Fantastic and the Invisible Woman's disappearance, the Human Torch takes him on a journey through the Multiverse, using the Multisect to find them. They have not been able to find Mister Fantastic and the Invisible Woman, as they return to Earth-616 empty-handed. The Thing and the Human Torch were reunited with Mister Fantastic and the Invisible Woman to help alongside other superheroes who were part of the Fantastic Four (including X-Men member Iceman) fight the Griever at the End of All Things after Mister Fantastic persuaded the Griever to let him summon the Thing and the Human Torch. As the Thing and his teammates finally return to 616, while the Future Foundation stays behind to keep learning about the Multiverse, the Thing reveals to them that he and Alicia proposed their wedding and are about to get married soon. Although the Baxter Building is now owned by a new superhero team, Fantastix, the Thing allows his teammates to use his hometown in Yancy Street as their current operation base.

== Relationships ==
The Thing is generally well liked by other heroes within the Marvel Universe. Grimm's relationship with his teammates has been a close but occasionally edgy one given his temper. He and Johnny Storm (the Human Torch) often argue and clash but they do respect each other.

Grimm's first love interest is the blind Alicia Masters, and he is intensely protective of her. When Johnny starts a relationship of his own with Alicia and they become engaged, Grimm is upset. However, he has to concede that, unlike himself and his stone-covered body, Johnny can "be a man". He agrees to act as best man at their wedding. The relationship between Alicia and Johnny ends with the revelation that the Alicia that Johnny fell in love with is actually Lyja, a member of the shape-changing alien race known as the Skrulls. The real Alicia, who was kept in suspended animation, is rescued by the Fantastic Four and reunited with the Thing.

Ben begins dating a teacher named Debbie Green. Ben soon asks Debbie to marry him, which she accepts. He later leaves her at the altar when he realizes the dangers of the wives of superheroes.

Ben and Alicia, on the other hand, do get married, despite an attack by Galactus. Later, in the aftermath of conflict between the Kree, the Skrulls and the Cotati, Ben and Alicia adopt two orphans, Kree boy Jo-Venn and Skrull girl N'Kala.

Grimm is best friends with Reed Richards, whom he addresses with the nickname "Stretch", due to Richards' natural height and his ability to stretch his body. However, Grimm also holds Reed responsible for his condition, since Richards had dismissed the potential danger of the cosmic rays that gave them their powers, although Grimm had taken them very seriously. At times of real frustration towards Reed, Grimm refers to him simply as "Richards".

Grimm is the godfather of Reed and Sue's son Franklin, who affectionately calls him "Unca Ben".

== Powers and abilities ==
The Thing's primary superhuman power is his great physical strength. Over the years, as a result of further mutation and rigorous training on machines designed by Reed Richards, his strength has increased dramatically.

He is capable of surviving impacts of great force without sustaining injury, as his body is covered with an orange, flexible, rock-like hide. He is also able to withstand gunfire from high-caliber weapons as well as armor-piercing rounds. It is possible to breach his exterior, and he does bleed as a result. One such instance involved Wolverine's adamantium claws scarring The Thing's face.

The Thing's highly advanced musculature generates fewer fatigue toxins during physical activity, granting him superhuman levels of stamina. When in his Thing form, he has only four fingers on each hand and four toes on each foot. The loss of one digit of each hand and foot, aside from the increase in volume of the remainder, does not affect his manual dexterity. That said, he has been shown doing things like holding a pencil and using it to dial a phone (even with rotary dials), or to push buttons on a keypad, to use devices that would ordinarily be too small for him.

Although he very rarely does so, the Thing is capable of performing super-human leaps several stories high.

Aside from his physical attributes, the Thing's senses can withstand higher levels of sensory stimulation than an ordinary human, with the exception of his sense of touch. His lungs are possessed of greater efficiency and volume than those of an ordinary human. As a result, the Thing is capable of holding his breath for much longer periods of time.

The Thing is a skilled pilot due to his time spent as a test pilot in the United States Marine Corps. As a founding member of the Fantastic Four, he is also a skilled hand-to-hand combatant. His fighting style incorporates elements of boxing, wrestling, judo, jujitsu, and street-fighting techniques, as well as hand-to-hand combat training from the military.

On occasion, when Ben Grimm regained his human form and lost his Thing powers, he used a suit of powered battle armor designed by Reed Richards that simulated the strength and durability of his mutated body, albeit to a weaker degree. Wearing the suit, which was designed to physically resemble his rocky form, Ben continued to participate in the Fantastic Four's adventures. The first exo-skeletal Thing suit was destroyed after Galactus restored Ben's natural powers and form. A second suit was built (presumably by Richards) and used sporadically when Ben had been returned to his human form again.

Reed has failed many times to restore Ben permanently to human form. When Doom reverses Sharon Ventura's similar cosmic-ray transformation, he uses both science and magic. Ben is almost immortal when in his Thing form, as he only ages when he is human. After Franklin and Valeria create a formula that allows Ben to become human for one week each year, Reed and Nathaniel traveled over 3,000 years into the future to see Ben still alive after all that time.

== Other versions ==
Several alternate universe versions of the Thing have appeared throughout the character's publication history.

=== Age of Apocalypse ===
In "Age of Apocalypse", Ben Grimm is a human member of the Human High Council, a group opposing Apocalypse.

=== Earth-818 ===
On Earth-818, which was conquered by Black Skull, a version of Ben Grimm called Infinity Thing, who has multicolored skin, appears as a member of the resistance against Black Skull and later joins the Avengers.

=== Fantastic Four: The End ===
In Fantastic Four: The End, the Thing is married to Alicia Masters, has three super-powered children, and resides on Mars with the Inhumans. He is now capable of shifting between his human and powered forms at will.

=== House of M ===
In House of M, Ben Grimm is the sole survivor of Reed Richards' voyage to space. Dubbed the It, Grimm becomes one of the Fearsome Four, though he is treated like an animal and often the victim of Doctor Doom's frustrations.

=== Marvel 1602 ===
In Neil Gaiman's Marvel 1602, Ben Grimm is the captain of the ship The Fantastick and is associated with the classical element of earth.

=== MC2 ===
In the alternative future of the MC2 imprint, the Thing is the ex-husband of Sharon Ventura.

=== Ultimate Marvel ===
In the Ultimate Marvel universe, Ben gained his powers from an accident involving Reed Richards' teleportation device. He later evolves into a form closer to his original human self, giving him purple glowing skin. This version also marries Sue and the two have a daughter together.

=== Ultimate Universe ===
In the Ultimate Universe imprint, Ben Grimm was killed after the Ultimate Marvel version of Richards, who had since become the Maker, sabotaged the space flight that would have given the Fantastic Four powers.

=== What If ===
Thing was featured in different "What If" stories:

- In What If? #11, Jack Kirby becomes the Thing along with fellow Marvel Comics employees Stan Lee, Sol Brodsky, and Flo Steinberg.
- In What If? #31, Ben refuses to join the other three in forming the Fantastic Four and instead unintentionally prevents the origins of Spider-Man, Thor, Iron Man, and Hulk as he rampages throughout New York.
- In What If? (vol. 2) #11, the origins of the Fantastic Four are retold in four stories, each showing how the heroes' lives would have changed if all four had each gained the same powers as the individual members of the original Fantastic Four.

== In other media ==
=== Television ===
- The Thing appears in Fantastic Four (1967), voiced by Paul Frees.
- The Thing appears in The New Fantastic Four (1978), voiced by Ted Cassidy.
- Benjy Grimm / the Thing appears in Fred and Barney Meet the Thing, voiced by Wayne Morton and Joe Baker respectively. This version is a teenager who can transform into the Thing with his "Thing rings".
- The Thing appears in Fantastic Four (1994), voiced by Chuck McCann.
- The Thing appears in the Spider-Man: The Animated Series three-part episode "Secret Wars", voiced by Patrick Pinney.
- The Thing appears in The Incredible Hulk episode "Fantastic Fortitude", voiced again by Chuck McCann.
- The Thing appears in Fantastic Four: World's Greatest Heroes, voiced by Brian Dobson.
- The Thing appears in The Super Hero Squad Show, voiced by Dave Boat.
- The Thing appears in The Avengers: Earth's Mightiest Heroes, voiced by Fred Tatasciore. This version is a member of the Fantastic Four and New Avengers whose rivalry with the Hulk stems from him being unable to defeat the latter in combat.
- The Thing appears in the Ultimate Spider-Man episode "The Incredible Spider-Hulk", voiced again by Dave Boat.
- The Thing appears in Hulk and the Agents of S.M.A.S.H., voiced again by Dave Boat.
- The Thing appears in the Avengers Assemble episode "Hulk's Day Out", voiced again by Dave Boat.
- The Thing appears in Spidey and His Amazing Friends, voiced by Andy Milder.
- The Thing appears in Lego Marvel Avengers: Mission Demolition, voiced by Roger Craig Smith.

=== Film ===
- Ben Grimm / the Thing appears in The Fantastic Four (1994), portrayed by Michael Bailey Smith and Carl Ciarfalio respectively.
- The Thing appears in Fantastic Four (2005), portrayed by Michael Chiklis. This version is from Brooklyn and was engaged before his transformation. After his fiancée leaves him, unable to accept his new form, he meets Alicia Masters and later comes to terms with his condition.
- The Thing appears in Fantastic Four: Rise of the Silver Surfer, portrayed again by Michael Chiklis.
- The Thing appears in Fantastic Four (2015), portrayed by Jamie Bell. This version was transformed by radiation from an alternate dimension called Planet Zero. This version gets his catchphrase from his abusive older brother.
- The Fantastic Four (2015) incarnation of the Thing was intended to appear in Deadpool 2. While 20th Century Fox approved the character's appearance, he was dropped after Tim Miller exited the project and the Thing was replaced with Colossus.
- The Thing appears in the Marvel Cinematic Universe (MCU) film The Fantastic Four: First Steps, portrayed by Ebon Moss-Bachrach. Notably, this version lacks the character's signature Brooklyn accent.
- The Thing will appear in the MCU films Avengers: Doomsday and Avengers: Secret Wars, portrayed again by Ebon Moss-Bachrach.

=== Video games ===
- The Thing appears in Questprobe featuring Human Torch and the Thing.
- The Thing appears as an assist character in Spider-Man (1995).
- An evil clone of the Thing appears in Marvel Super Heroes in War of the Gems.
- The Thing appears as a playable character in Fantastic Four (1997).
- The Thing appears as a playable character in Fantastic Four (2005), voiced by Michael Chiklis. Additionally, his "classic" design appears in bonus levels, voiced by Fred Tatasciore.
- The Thing appears as a playable character in Marvel Nemesis: Rise of the Imperfects, voiced by Mark Gibbon.
- The Thing appears as a playable character in Marvel Ultimate Alliance, voiced by Gregg Berger.
- The Thing appears as a playable character in Fantastic Four: Rise of the Silver Surfer, voiced by Joey Camen.
- The Thing appears in Marvel: Ultimate Alliance 2, voiced again by Fred Tatasciore.
- Ben Grimm as the Thing and Angrir, Breaker of Souls appears in Pinball FX 2, voiced by Zach Hanks.
- The Thing appears in Marvel Super Hero Squad, voiced by Dave Boat.
- The Thing appears as a playable character in Marvel Super Hero Squad Online, voiced again by Dave Boat.
- The Thing appears in LittleBigPlanet via the "Marvel Costume Kit 1" DLC.
- The Thing appears as a playable character in Marvel Heroes, voiced again by Dave Boat.
- The Thing appears as a playable character in Lego Marvel Super Heroes, voiced again by Dave Boat.
- The Thing appears as a playable character in Marvel: Contest of Champions.
- The Thing appears as a playable character in Marvel: Future Fight.
- The Thing appears as a playable character in Marvel Puzzle Quest.
- The Thing appears as a downloadable playable character in Marvel Ultimate Alliance 3: The Black Order via the "Shadow of Doom" DLC, voiced again by Dave Boat.
- The Thing appears as a playable character in Marvel Rivals, voiced by Andrew Morgado.
- The Thing appears in Fortnite as part of a promotional shop item for The Fantastic Four: First Steps.
- The Thing appears as a DLC character in Marvel Cosmic Invasion.

=== Miscellaneous ===
The Thing appears in the BBC radio adaptation of the Spider Man comics, voiced by Gary Martin.

== In popular culture ==
- The Thing appears in the Saturday Night Live episode "Superhero Party", portrayed by an uncredited actor.
- The Thing makes non-speaking cameo appearances in The Simpsons.
- The Thing appears in the Robot Chicken episode "Monstourage", voiced by Michael Chiklis.
- Professional wrestler CM Punk uses The Thing's catchphrase "it's clobberin' time!" as part of his ring entrance.

== Reception ==
In 2011, IGN ranked the Thing 18th in the "Top 100 Comic Book Heroes", and 23rd in their list of "The Top 50 Avengers" in 2012. The Thing was named Empire magazine's tenth of "The 50 Greatest Comic Book Characters" in 2008.

The Thing was ranked #2 on a listing of Marvel Comics' monster characters in 2015.

In 2022, Screen Rant included The Thing in their "MCU: 10 Most Desired Fan Favorite Debuts Expected In The Multiverse Saga" list.

Lee later noted that The Thing was the most popular character in the Fantastic Four; he surmised that the character fit the classic grotesque archetype, much as Quasimodo was more popular than Claude Frollo, Esmeralda or the more "glamorous" characters in The Hunchback of Notre-Dame. For his next superhero creation, he deliberately drew on that popularity in creating the similarly monstrous Hulk.

== Collected editions ==
Title	Material collected	Published date	ISBN
Thing Classic Vol. 1	Thing (vol. 1) #1–10	March 2011	978-0785153085
Thing Classic Vol. 2	Thing (vol. 1) #11–22, Fantastic Four #274	August 2012	978-0785159797
Thing Omnibus	Thing (vol. 1) #1–36; Fantastic Four #274, 277, 296; Secret Wars II #7; West Coast Avengers (vol. 2) #10; Questprobe #3; Marvel Tales #198; The Incredible Hulk and the Thing: The Big Change and material from Marvel Fanfare #15, Marvel Super-Heroes #5	November 2022	978-1302945787
Hulk & Thing: Hard Knocks	Hulk & Thing: Hard Knocks #1–4, Giant-Size Super Stars #1	February 2005	978-0785115762
Fantastic Four: Clobberin' Time	Tales of The Thing #1–3, Marvel Age Fantastic Four Tales #1, Spider-Man Team-Up Special #1	June 2005	978-0785117384
The Thing: Freakshow	Thing: Freakshow #1–4, Thing & She-Hulk: The Long Night #1	July 2005	978-0785119111
Stan Lee Meets	Stan Lee Meets the Thing #1 and Stan Lee Meets the Amazing Spider-Man #1, Stan Lee Meets Doctor Strange #1, Stan Lee Meets Doctor Doom #1, Stan Lee Meets Silver Surfer #1; Amazing Spider-Man (vol. 1) #87, Fantastic Four (vol. 1) #79, 87, Marvel Premiere #3, Silver Surfer (vol. 1) #14.	March 2007	978-0785122722
Thing: Idol of Millions	Thing (vol. 2) #1–8	September 2006	978-0785118138
Thing: The Next Big Thing	Thing (vol. 3) #1–6	September 2022	978-1302927998
Clobberin' Time	Clobberin' Time #1–5	October 2023	978-1302934668
