= Memorial Day (1999 film) =

American slasher film

- DVD released by Maverick Entertainment Group
- Directed by: Christopher Alender
- Written by: Marcos Gabriel
- Produced by: Harry Perry III; Marissa Messier
- Starring: Adam Sterritt; Derek Nieves; Jasmine Trice; Erin Gallagher; Marcos Gabriel; Andrew Williams; Therese Fretwell
- Cinematography: Kathryn Schmidt
- Edited by: Marcos Gabriel; Christopher Alender
- Music by: Rob Wallace
- Production company: Soapbox Films
- Distributed by: Maverick Entertainment Group
- Release date: June 30, 1999 (United States)
- Running time: 79 minutes
- Country: United States
- Language: English
- Budget: $4,000

Memorial Day (also known as Memorial Day Killer) is a 1999 slasher film directed by Christopher Alender and written by Marcos Gabriel.

== Plot ==
The night before Memorial Day, Tyra and Trevor are stabbed to death in their apartment by a cloaked figure in a black and white papier-mâché mask. The next day, Rachel, her cousin Leo, and their five friends (Mickey, Cindy, Seth, Reagan, and Jeremy) head to Memorial Lake Campground for the first time since Rachel's adopted brother Danny accidentally drowned there three years ago. After reaching the camp and setting up, the group drinks around a campfire and tells ghost stories, though Seth goes back to the cabins to watch television, and catches a news broadcast mentioning the murders of Tyra and Trevor, who were supposed to come along on the trip. Seth rushes back to the others and tells them about what happened to Trevor and Tyra, just as a booby trap launches a spear into Jeremy, killing him, and scattering the group.

Seth tries to drive to safety, but runs out of gas, and is confronted by the killer who sends a man he had earlier captured out to tell Seth to get out of his car. Seth refuses to get out, so the killer persuades him by shooting the hostage. Back at the camp, Mickey bludgeons a masked man with a baseball bat, unmasking him afterward to discover it was Seth, who was gagged and had his hands tied together. The killer then attacks Reagan, killing her by forcing her to crawl across razor blades while he beats her with a hot piece of rebar. Next, Cindy is shot, and Mickey is tortured to death with fish hooks, nails, and a knife.

Rachel and Leo regroup, and a hysterical Rachel blames herself for everything that has happened, confessing that she was the one who brought Danny out on the boat the night he drowned. This causes Leo to reveal that he is the killer, and that Danny (who was his biological brother) has been "speaking" to him, ordering him to avenge his death by murdering everyone involved in it. Leo tries to kill Rachel, but she shoots him with his own gun, revealing before she does so that she purposely drowned Danny, who she hated.

In a post-credits scene, Rachel is shown walking away from the camp as Leo gets up, and puts his mask on after it is pushed across the floor by an invisible force. A distorted voice is then heard wailing, "We're coming for you!"

== Cast ==
- Marcos Gabriel as Leo
- Therese Fretwell as Rachel
- Andrew Williams as Mickey
- Erin Gallagher as Cindy
- Derek Nieves as Seth
- Jasmine Trice as Reagan Childs
- Adam Sterritt as Jeremy
- John Hayden as Trevor Daniels
- Martine Shandles as Tyra Scott
- Randy Weinstein as Man
- Bill Orr as Newscaster
- Dave Smith as Stalker
- Peter Marsha as Stalker Voice

== Reception ==
Brian Solomon of Bloody Disgusting derided the film, deeming it an "originality-challenged endeavor".
