= Michael Bailey Smith =

American actor

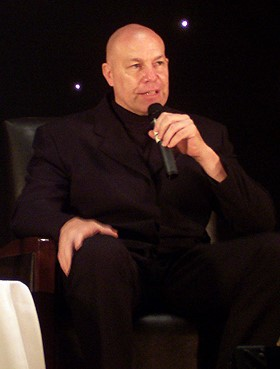
- Smith at a Charmed convention in 2006
- Born: Alpena, Michigan, U.S.
- Education: Eastern Michigan University
- Occupations: Actor, VP of World Global IoT Sales
- Years active: 1989–present
- Website: michaelbaileysmith.com

Michael Bailey Smith is an American actor. He is best known for his appearances on the television series Charmed, where he played Belthazor, a Grimlock leader and Shax.

== Early life ==
Smith was born in Alpena, Michigan, to an Air Force family, who lived in Tehran, Iran, during his last two years of high school. He graduated from Tehran American School. After working for Westinghouse, he joined the United States Army where he served in the 82nd Airborne Division as a paratrooper. He then attended college at Eastern Michigan University, where his athletic talents earned him a spot as a free agent with the Dallas Cowboys in 1985. Smith's football career was cut short by injury and he returned to Eastern Michigan University, where in 1988 he earned a bachelor of science degree in computer aided design.

== Career ==
Smith stumbled upon acting when he accompanied a friend to an audition for the 1989 film A Nightmare on Elm Street 5: The Dream Child. Smith landed the role of Super Freddy. Smith would appear three years later in a small role in Renegade playing PJ Butler. In 1994, he appeared in an unreleased Marvel Comics adaptation of The Fantastic Four as Ben Grimm. Smith was also cast in Cyborg 3: The Recycler alongside Malcolm McDowell.

Smith appeared in many TV series, such as Diagnosis: Murder, Star Trek: Voyager, Wings and Conan the Adventurer. In 1999, Smith had small roles as guards in Donald Petrie's My Favorite Martian and The X-Files. Smith appeared 18 times in the hit TV show Charmed, where he played Belthazor, The Source, Grimlock and Shax. Also in 2002, he appeared in the hit sequel Men in Black II, where he portrayed the character Creepy. In 2003, Smith was the brother of Bob (Monster Man) in the hit movie Monster Man. Around that time, he appeared in the TV series The O.C. and Desperate Housewives.

In 2006, Smith was cast as villain Pluto in the remake of The Hills Have Eyes. In 2007, he played villain Papa Hades in The Hills Have Eyes 2. He also starred in the 2010 horror film Chain Letter, alongside Nikki Reed, and Noah Segan, directed by Deon Taylor.

== Filmography ==
=== Film and television ===
- 1989 A Nightmare on Elm Street 5: The Dream Child as Super Freddy
- 1992 CIA Code Name: Alexa as Vlad
- 1992 Renegade as P.J. Butler
- 1993 Silk Stalkings as Lonnie Brill
- 1994 Cyborg 3: The Recycler as Donovan Cyborg
- 1994 Ice as Jimmy, The Courier
- 1994 Cage II as Sampo Fighter (uncredited)
- 1994 The Fantastic Four as Ben Grimm / The Thing
- 1995 The Best of the Best 3: No Turning Back as "Tiny"
- 1995 Babylon 5 as G'Dok
- 1995–1996 Murphy Brown as Wrestler Secretary #74 and Secretary #74
- 1995 The Home Court as Man #2
- 1996 Family Matters as "Snap"
- 1996 The Drew Carey Show as Big Guy #1
- 1996 Wings as Jaffra
- 1996 Space Marines as Gunther
- 1996 Star Trek: Voyager as Alien #1
- 1997 Lawless as Bob "Obituary Bob"
- 1997 Malcolm & Eddie as Steven
- 1997 Conan as Gokrey
- 1998 Diagnosis: Murder as Guard #1
- 1998 Between Brothers as The Guy
- 1998 Arli$$
- 1998 Whatever It Takes as Kevin Thompson
- 1998–1999 Seven Days as Brenneman
- 1999 My Favorite Martian as Big Guard
- 1999 Unconditional Love
- 1999 The X-Files as Guard
- 1999 L.A. Heat as Terry King
- 1999 Final Voyage as Erickson
- 1999 Martial Law as Lead Henchman
- 2000 Little Man on Campus as Chuck
- 2000 V.I.P. as "Tomahawk"
- 2000 Submerged as Lieutenant Nick Stuart
- 2000 Buffy the Vampire Slayer as Toth
- 2000 Love Her Madly as "Big Red"
- 2000 Bad Guys as Right Hand Man
- 2000–2001 Nash Bridges as Mike "Iron Mike" Willis
- 2000–2002 Charmed as Belthazor / Shax / Grimlock / The Source / Janor
- 2001 Roswell as Casino Guard
- 2001 Town & Country as Guard #2
- 2001 To Protect and Serve as Chuck
- 2001 Circuit as Mike
- 2001 Philly as George
- 2002 Grounded for Life as Jack
- 2002 Malcolm in the Middle as Coach
- 2002 The Division as "Skull" Corbett
- 2002 Undisputed as Willard Bechtel
- 2002 Inside as Bo
- 2002 Purpose as The Bouncer
- 2002 Men in Black II as "Creepy"
- 2002 The Master of Disguise as Henchman
- 2002 Blood Shot as Vampire
- 2002 Fastlane as Thick Neck Who's Talking (uncredited)
- 2002 Black Mask 2: City of Masks as "Hellraiser" Ross
- 2002 The Truth About Beef Jerky as Dick
- 2003 She Spies as Lucus Winter
- 2003 In Hell as Valya
- 2003 Monster Man as Monster Man
- 2004 Oliver Beene as Mauler Madson
- 2004 Short Fuse: A collection of Explosive Shorts as Bo
- 2005 The O.C. as Joe
- 2005 Candy Paint as Rick Adler
- 2005 The Unknown as Manny
- 2005 Jane Doe: The Wrong Face as Jackson
- 2005 Desperate Housewives as Bob
- 2006–2007 My Name Is Earl as Skinhead #1 / Skinhead Prisoner
- 2006 Spymate as Hugo
- 2006 The Hills Have Eyes as Pluto
- 2006 Pepper Dennis as Police Officer
- 2007 Careless as Neighbor #2
- 2007 The Hills Have Eyes II as Papa Hades
- 2009 Thirsty as The Thrill Killer
- 2010 Chain Letter as Chain Man
- 2010 Days of Our Lives as Bernie
- 2010 Bad Ass as Brooklyn Bridges
- 2010 Crime Scene X: Creepy Crawlies as Detective Dan Houston
- 2010 Crime Scene X-Flames of Execution as Detective Dan Houston
- 2010 The Visitation as Gabe
- 2011 Chuck as Vlad
- 2011 Pair of Kings as Zadoc
- 2011 House as Sullivan
- 2011 Two and a Half Men as Dave
- 2012 Southland as Bobby Bedford
- 2012 Shameless as Man In Dress
- 2012 Eagleheart as The Bouncer
- 2013 Blood Show as Vampire
- 2014 Revelation Road: The Black Rider as Salinas
- 2015 Black-ish as Security Guard
- 2015 Cocked as Gunman
- 2015 Kids vs. Monsters as Mr. Beet
- 2016 Bus Driver as Jace
- 2025 The Fantastic Four: First Steps as Power Plant Worker #2

=== Video games ===
- 1998 Cyber Strike 2
- 2000 MechWarrior 4: Vengeance as Tarquin Cardona
- 2002 Emperor: Battle for Dune as Burseg
- 2002 Nightcaster: Defeat the Darkness
