= NightCaster =

2002 video game

- Developer: VR1 Entertainment
- Publisher: Microsoft Game Studios
- Producer: Brett Close
- Designers: David Osborne, Adam Maxwell, Chris Holtorf
- Programmer: John Ramsey
- Artist: Steven Morrison
- Writer: Chris Zirpoli
- Composer: Heather Sowards
- Platform: Xbox
- Release: NA: January 22, 2002; EU: May 31, 2002
- Genre: Action-adventure
- Mode: Single-player

NightCaster: Defeat the Darkness is a 2002 third-person, single-player, action-adventure game for the Xbox, developed by VR1 Entertainment and published by Microsoft. Players take the role of Arran, a novice wizard whose magical power grows as he ages throughout his quest to collect spells and rid the world of eternal night. Following tepid pre-release coverage, NightCaster was released to mixed reviews. Reception of the game has remained mixed following release. A sequel, NightCaster II: Equinox, was released in December 2002.

== Gameplay ==
The player directly controls Arran from a third person perspective. Spells are aimed using the orb (who also is the guide character who provides narration and objectives). There are four classes of spells: fire, water, light, and dark. Creatures have varying degrees of vulnerability to each type of spell (a "dark" creature is more vulnerable to light spells). As the player progresses, Arran finds more spells, and can cast them at higher levels by charging them.

== Plot ==
The start of the story mode introduces the player to Arran, a young boy living in a small village. One day, Arran creeps into a forest whilst playing hide and seek with his friends, and stumbles upon a glowing floating orb. The orb informs him that he must go on a quest to defeat the evil 'Night Caster'. Arran is then placed in suspended animation (even though he still ages) by the orb, presumably so that he 'will be ready' to fight the Nightcaster.

Arran wakes up, having aged to around the mid-twenties, to find his world devastated by darkness and the legions of monsters under the reign of the Nightcaster spreading terror over the populace. Arran's parents are supposedly dead when Arran finds his home to be a smoldering wreckage, at which point the orb informs him that 'it is the Nightcaster['s doing]'. So he starts his quest facing many creatures and as he ages his spells are stronger, more effective and more expansive.

== Development and release ==
NightCaster was developed by VR-1 Entertainment, a Boulder, Colorado based subsidiary of Pacific Century Cyber Works. The game was the first console release for the studio, which had developed online games since 1998 including the Fighter Ace series. Lead designer David Osbourne stated that the studio aimed to create a purely action-focused design "in the heritage [of] the traditional shooter". NightCaster featured the first use of the Tesla game engine created by the developer. Publisher Microsoft announced the game on 13 March 2001, coinciding with the presentation of the game at Gamestock, an industry convention displaying games in the publisher's lineup, although the game was not included as part of the event's main presentation and received less attention than other titles. The game was also showcased at the Microsoft booth at E3 in May 2001. The game was the last release by VR-1 Entertainment, who were merged by PCCW into a new company, Jaleco Entertainment, in October 2002.

== Reception ==
Reception

Aggregate score
Aggregator	Score
Metacritic	61/100

Review scores
Publication	Score
AllGame	2/5
Edge	3/10
Electronic Gaming Monthly	4/10
Game Informer	5.5/10
GamePro	3.5/5
GameRevolution	B−
GameSpot	6.8/10
GameSpy	63%
GameZone	7/10
IGN	7.3/10
Official Xbox Magazine (US)	4.9/10

=== Pre-release ===
Prior to release, press expectations for NightCaster were tempered. Hyper expressed that it at first appeared in previews "to be nothing more than a very generic fantasy game", raising concerns that the game "doesn't seem to really offer anything new". Electronic Gaming Monthly similarly expected "hack-and-slash gameplay in your run-of-the-mill fantasy role-playing world". Reflecting the game was from an "unknown" developer, GameSpot stated that it "is not the Xbox's killer app, but doesn't have any designs to be either". Similarly, XBM qualified "this may not offer the depth of some RPG games but then this isn't what NightCaster is all about", hoping its role-playing elements would prevent the game from "becoming too monotonous". Several compared the game to the announced Xbox title Azurik: Rise of Perathia, with Game Informer and IGN describing the game as the "other action-adventure game" slated for the console. However, some expressed that the game could fill an action-roleplaying niche in the console's launch, although others implied the game would not be a compelling draw.

=== Reviews ===
Upon release, NightCaster received "mixed" reviews according to review aggregation website Metacritic.

=== Retrospective ===
Retrospective reception of NightCaster has been mixed, with many sources commenting that the game was an example of the weak Xbox launch lineup and action-adventure catalog. Several critics restated mixed opinions about the game upon release of its sequel. Xbox Nation stated the game had "ambitious RPG posturing" but was "noting more than a glorified shoot-em-up", considering the sequel repeated the same errors as the debut. However, Play considered that NightCaster was a "gorgeous, addicting action game" that received a "raw deal in the press". Later reviews shared similarly mixed assessments. IGN praised the game's "unique" story, "dark and ominous" tone and "interesting" combat, but expressed the game was a "little too linear" and its characters needed "more personality". GamePro discussed that the game was an example of the overuse of classical elements as a fantasy trope. Games Asylum considered that whilst the game was "designed to fill the role of being the Xbox's launch-day RPG", the game had more in common with Gauntlet and other western role-playing games and was poorly received. TheGamer viewed the game "had a lot of potential", highlighting its "huge selection of spells" but failed to stand out due to being "quite short and simple in terms of level design and gameplay mechanics".
