= Fantastic Four: Rise of the Silver Surfer =

2007 film by Tim Story

- Theatrical release poster
- Directed by: Tim Story
- Screenplay by: Don Payne; Mark Frost
- Story by: John Turman; Mark Frost
- Based on: Fantastic Four by: Stan Lee; Jack Kirby
- Produced by: Avi Arad; Bernd Eichinger; Ralph Winter
- Starring: Ioan Gruffudd; Jessica Alba; Chris Evans; Michael Chiklis; Julian McMahon; Kerry Washington; Andre Braugher
- Cinematography: Larry Blanford
- Edited by: William Hoy; Peter S. Elliot
- Music by: John Ottman
- Production companies: 20th Century Fox; Constantin Film; Marvel Entertainment (Note: The company is credited as Marvel Studios, despite not being a part of the Marvel Cinematic Universe. The rights to the Fantastic Four would eventually revert to the actual Marvel Studios following the acquisition of 21st Century Fox by Disney in 2019.); 1492 Pictures; Ingenious Film Partners; Dune Entertainment
- Distributed by: 20th Century Fox (Worldwide); Constantin Film (Germany)
- Release dates: June 13, 2007 (Premiere (Note: First released in Bahrain, Egypt, Indonesia, Jamaica, Kuwait, Oman, the Philippines, and Trinidad and Tobago)); June 15, 2007 (United Kingdom and United States); August 14, 2007 (Germany)
- Running time: 92 minutes
- Countries: Germany; United Kingdom; United States
- Language: English
- Budget: $120–130 million
- Box office: $301.9 million

Fantastic Four: Rise of the Silver Surfer (Note: Stylized as Fantastic 4: Rise of the Silver Surfer on home media, and simply 4: Rise of the Silver Surfer onscreen) is a 2007 superhero film based on the Marvel Comics superhero team the Fantastic Four. The sequel to Fantastic Four (2005), it was directed by Tim Story, from a screenplay by Don Payne and Mark Frost. The film stars Ioan Gruffudd, Jessica Alba, Chris Evans, and Michael Chiklis as the title characters, with Julian McMahon, Kerry Washington, Andre Braugher, Beau Garrett, Doug Jones and Laurence Fishburne in supporting roles. The plot follows the Fantastic Four, alongside Doctor Doom, as they confront the Silver Surfer to save Earth from Galactus.

The film was released in the United States on June 15, 2007, to mixed reviews, with many deeming it an improvement over its predecessor. Although the film was a commercial success, earning $301.9 million worldwide, it was less than its predecessor, which grossed $333.5 million worldwide. A third film was planned but ultimately cancelled. The series was rebooted in 2015 with the release of Fantastic Four to poor critical and commercial reception. Marvel Studios eventually reclaimed the film rights of the characters, along with the X-Men, after the acquisition of 21st Century Fox by Disney. Evans, who would go on to star as Captain America in the Marvel Cinematic Universe (MCU), reprised his role as Johnny Storm / Human Torch in the 2024 film Deadpool & Wolverine.

== Plot ==
The US government asks Reed Richards to track a mysterious, meteor-like object that has entered Earth's atmosphere, is creating large craters and is seemingly causing fluctuations in the weather and power outages. Meanwhile, Reed and his fiancée, Susan Storm, who have been preparing for their upcoming wedding, consider ending their activities with the Fantastic Four.

Reed and Susan's wedding ceremony is interrupted when the phenomenon approaches New York City; Johnny Storm pursues it, discovering it to be a humanoid alien on a flying surfboard, subsequently dubbed the Silver Surfer. Johnny confronts the Surfer, who overpowers him; he is later examined by Reed, who discovers that his exposure to the Surfer has set Johnny's molecular structure in passive flux, allowing him to switch superpowers with the others through physical contact.

Reed traces the Surfer's cosmic energy, discovering a series of planets the Surfer previously visited that have all been destroyed, and determining that it will strike next in London. The Four fail to stop the Surfer from creating another crater, which drains the River Thames. Meanwhile, the Surfer also passes over Latveria, freeing Victor von Doom from his frozen state. (Note: As depicted in Fantastic Four (2005)) Doom confronts the Surfer in the Russell Glacier; the Surfer defeats Doom, but in doing so restores Doom's human form.

Doom leverages his experience with the Surfer over the US military, who force the Four to work with him. Deducing that the Surfer's board is the source of his power, Reed develops a pulse generator that will separate him from it. They track the Surfer to the Black Forest, where he informs Susan that he is not the one trying to destroy Earth before the pulse is activated, separating the Surfer from his board.

The weakened Surfer is imprisoned by the military in Siberia and tortured. Susan sneaks into the Surfer's cell, where she learns he is serving Galactus, a giant cosmic entity that feeds on life-bearing planets. His service to Galactus prevents his own world from being destroyed, and the Surfer's board serves as a homing beacon leading Galactus to Earth. Doom steals the Surfer's board and uses it to escape to China; the Four free the Surfer and pursue Doom in the Fantasticar, confronting him in Shanghai, where he impales Sue. With the Surfer powerless, Johnny absorbs the combined powers of the team to battle Doom and, with the assistance of Ben Grimm, defeats him and retrieves the board.

As Galactus approaches Earth, the Surfer regains control of his board, is inspired by Sue's humanity, revives her, and vows to end Galactus' destructive path. With help from Johnny, the Surfer flies into the stratosphere and confronts Galactus, where a massive blast of energy engulfs them both. Johnny's second exposure to the Surfer leaves him no longer able to switch powers. Reed and Sue decide they no longer want to leave the Fantastic Four for a normal life and are then married in Japan, before they, Johnny, and Ben are summoned to an emergency in Venice. In a mid-credits scene, the lifeless Silver Surfer floats through space until his eyes open and his board flies back to him.

== Cast ==
- Ioan Gruffudd as Reed Richards
- Jessica Alba as Sue Storm
- Chris Evans as Johnny Storm
- Michael Chiklis as Ben Grimm
- Julian McMahon as Victor Von Doom
- Kerry Washington as Alicia Masters
- Andre Braugher as General Hager
- Laurence Fishburne as Voice of the Silver Surfer
- Doug Jones as Silver Surfer
- Beau Garrett as Captain Raye
- Brian Posehn as Wedding Minister
- Zach Grenier as Mr. Sherman/Rafke
- Kenneth Welsh as Dr. Jeff Wagner
- Vanessa Minnillo as Johnny's Wedding Date
- Stan Lee as Rejected Wedding Guest

== Production ==
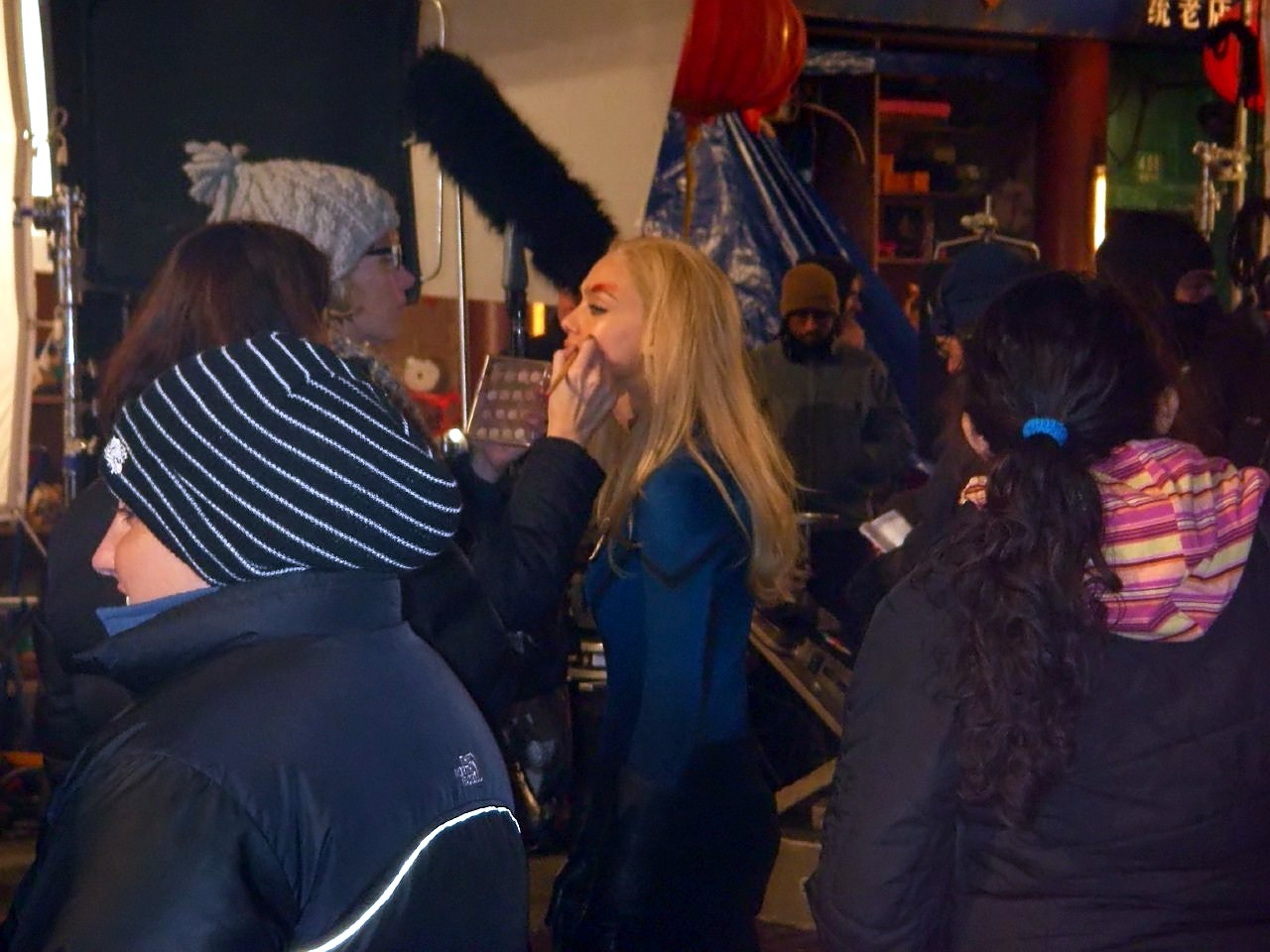
Jessica Alba getting her makeup retouched on the film set

With Fantastic Four grossing $330 million worldwide, 20th Century Fox hired director Tim Story and screenwriter Mark Frost in December 2005 to return for the sequel. Screenwriters Frost and Don Payne were hired to create the screenplay. Payne has said the film is based on "The Galactus Trilogy", as well as comic issues 57–60 in which Doom steals the Surfer's power. Payne has also said the film takes inspiration from the Ultimate Marvel limited series Ultimate Extinction. As of March 2, 2007, Galactus' design was not yet done, and by April 18, until hiring Laurence Fishburne to perform the voice, the filmmakers were unsure of whether the character would speak. Doug Jones was chosen to physically portray the Surfer; both this film and Hellboy remain the only two films where he has been dubbed over in English.

The film includes the Fantasticar, a larger role for Kerry Washington's character Alicia Masters, and in June 2006, the Silver Surfer was announced to appear in the sequel as a "villain/hero". The Silver Surfer has been created by combining the performance of actor Doug Jones, a grey-silver suit designed by Jose Fernandez and created by VFX shop Spectral Motion which has then been enhanced by a new CGI system designed by Weta Workshop.

The sequel, whose working title was Fantastic Four 2, was officially titled Fantastic Four: Rise of the Silver Surfer in August 2006, with filming beginning on August 28 in Vancouver and set for a release date of June 15, 2007. Michael Chiklis' prosthetics as The Thing were also redesigned to allow him to take it off in between takes and for better ventilation.

In August 2006, actor Andre Braugher dropped out of an ER supporting role to be cast in Rise of the Silver Surfer. Braugher was cast as General Hager, whom director Story described as "an old acquaintance of Reed Richards and one of the major additions to the movie". Director Tim Story said the script originally contained Nick Fury, but the role eventually became that of General Hager, as having Fury would have forced Fox to purchase that character's rights from Marvel. Some of Hager's lines in the film originate from Fury in Ultimate Extinction. In September, Jones was confirmed to portray the Silver Surfer in addition to Julian McMahon reprising his role as Doctor Doom. The Baxter Building was also redesigned.

During filming the scene where Sue shows emotions, Story asked Alba to cry pretty as he thought it looked "too real" and "too painful", he also told her that they could CGI her tears.

== Release ==
=== Marketing ===
The teaser trailer was initially exclusively attached to Night at the Museum. It was released to the general public online on December 26, 2006, on the film's official website. The theatrical trailer was scheduled to appear during the film Disturbia on April 13, 2007, but errors occurred and Tim Story announced that it would be released with Spider-Man 3 on May 4, 2007. The theatrical trailer was finally released online on April 30, 2007, on Apple Trailers' website. 20th Century Fox launched an outdoor advertising campaign at the end of February. The cast also made an appearance at the Coca-Cola 600 Nextel Cup NASCAR race in Charlotte over Memorial Day weekend.

In late May 2007, 20th Century Fox struck a deal with the Franklin Mint to promote the movie by altering 40,000 U.S. quarters and releasing them into circulation. All of the altered quarters were minted in 2005 and honor the state of California as part of the 50 State Quarters program created by the U.S. Mint. The altered quarters feature the Silver Surfer on the reverse, along with a URL to the movie's official website. Once the U.S. Mint became aware of the promotion, it notified the studio and the Franklin Mint that it was breaking the law by turning government-issued currency into private advertising. The federal mint did not indicate whether a penalty would be effected.

=== Home media ===
The film was released October 2, 2007 on DVD and Blu-ray. Also included in the release is a 2-movie collection box set with the first film.

== Reception ==
=== Box office ===
On its opening weekend, the film was the highest-grossing movie at the U.S. box office, reaching approximately $58 million, $2 million more than its predecessor. By its second weekend, the film suffered a 66% drop and a 54% drop in its third weekend. The film grossed $301.9 million worldwide, including a $131.9 million gross in the United States and in Canada. The budget was $120–130 million.

=== Critical response ===
On review aggregator Rotten Tomatoes, the film holds an approval rating of 38% based on 173 reviews, with an average rating of 5.1/10. The website's critics consensus reads: "While an improvement on its predecessor, Fantastic Four: Rise of the Silver Surfer is nevertheless a juvenile, simplistic picture that has little benefit beyond its special effects." On Metacritic, the film has a weighted average score of 45 out of 100, based on 33 critics, indicating "mixed or average" reviews. Audiences polled by CinemaScore gave the film an average grade of "B" on an A+ to F scale, the same grade as its predecessor.

The New York Times critic Manohla Dargis called the film an "amalgam of recycled ideas, dead air, dumb quips, casual sexism and pseudoscientific mumbo jumbo". Joe Morgenstern of The Wall Street Journal said the film was "more fun than in the original" but "fails to sustain its modest running time of 87 minutes." James Berardinelli of ReelViews.com called the film "so lackluster it makes Spider-Man 3 feel like a masterpiece by comparison".

Kevin Maher of The Times liked the film's light tone saying "the film is everything you'd expect from a movie that began in the pages of a 1960s comic book – garish, giddy, emotionally simplistic, boldly idiotic and mercifully short". New York Daily News liked the movie: "It's almost a surprise that the sequel is actually better — much better — than the original."

=== Accolades ===
Rise of the Silver Surfer was nominated for fifteen awards, winning two. The film won the 2008 Golden Trailer Award for "Best Teaser Poster", against competition from Saw IV, and Quantum of Solace, among others. At the 2008 Kids' Choice Awards, Jessica Alba won for "Favorite Female Movie Star", over Keira Knightley of Pirates of the Caribbean: At World's End, and Kirsten Dunst of Spider-Man 3. Rise of the Silver Surfer was nominated for five additional Kids' Choice awards.

Fantastic Four: Rise of the Silver Surfer lost to Cloverfield for the Academy of Science Fiction, Fantasy, and Horror Films' 2008 Best Science Fiction Film award, just as it lost in the "Best Summer Movie You Haven't Seen Yet" category, presented by the MTV Movie Awards to Transformers. The United Kingdom's National Movie Awards, additionally, selected Harry Potter and the Order of the Phoenix over Rise of the Silver Surfer in its 2007 "Best Family" category. The film was nominated in eight categories during the Teen Choice Awards ceremonies of 2007, but won no award.

== Franchise ==
=== Cancelled sequel ===
The main four cast originally signed a three-movie deal, with Fox Studios and Julian McMahon also signed for a third film. Michael Chiklis was told Ben Grimm's relationship with Alicia Masters would have had a greater focus in a third film and Jessica Alba expressed interest in introducing Franklin Richards, while Beau Garrett wished to return as Nova. Tim Story said he was interested in directing a third and fourth film and writer Don Payne stated while he had not discussed a sequel with the studio, he was interested in working with more Fantastic Four characters saying "I've always loved the Inhumans, the Skrulls, the Puppet Master, and Annihilus and the Negative Zone". In May 2007, Story said he wanted Djimon Hounsou to play Black Panther. As Fantastic Four: Rise of the Silver Surfer performed less at the box office than the first film, 20th Century Fox was unsure of the series' future, and no script was in development. In March 2008, Chris Evans revealed, "I'm pretty sure we won't do another one. I'm assuming that one is a closed book."

=== Reboot ===
In August 2009, Fox announced plans to reboot the Fantastic Four film franchise, with Michael Green and Jeremy Slater writing, Seth Grahame-Smith polishing the film's script, and Akiva Goldsman and Matthew Vaughn producing. After the release of 2012's Chronicle, Josh Trank was linked to the reboot, and in mid July 2012, he was officially announced to be director. Filming started mid September 2013. As it is produced by Fox, the film is independent from the Marvel Cinematic Universe. Fantastic Four was released on August 7, 2015. The film experienced a worse critical reception than the original films and failed at the box office, leading to the cancellation of a sequel planned for a 2017 release.

=== Marvel Cinematic Universe ===
In 2019, after Disney successfully acquired Fox, the film rights of the Fantastic Four were reverted to Marvel Studios, with plans to integrate the characters, along with the X-Men and Deadpool, into the Marvel Cinematic Universe. Jon Watts was originally attached to direct, but later stepped down after expressing his desire to take a "break" from superhero films. The Fantastic Four: First Steps was released in the United States on July 25, 2025, as the first film of Phase Six of the MCU. The cast includes Pedro Pascal as Reed Richards, Vanessa Kirby as Sue Storm, Joseph Quinn as Johnny Storm and Ebon Moss-Bachrach as Ben Grimm.

John Krasinski portrayed an alternate version of Reed Richards in the Marvel Cinematic Universe film Doctor Strange in the Multiverse of Madness (2022).

In 2024, Chris Evans reprised his role as Johnny Storm in the Marvel Cinematic Universe film Deadpool & Wolverine.
