= The Fantastic Four: First Steps =

2025 Marvel Studios film

- Theatrical release poster
- Directed by: Matt Shakman
- Screenplay by: Josh Friedman; Eric Pearson; Jeff Kaplan; Ian Springer
- Story by: Eric Pearson; Jeff Kaplan; Ian Springer; Kat Wood
- Based on: Fantastic Four by: Stan Lee; Jack Kirby
- Produced by: Kevin Feige
- Starring: Pedro Pascal; Vanessa Kirby; Ebon Moss-Bachrach; Joseph Quinn; Julia Garner; Sarah Niles; Mark Gatiss; Natasha Lyonne; Paul Walter Hauser; Ralph Ineson
- Cinematography: Jess Hall
- Edited by: Nona Khodai; Tim Roche
- Music by: Michael Giacchino
- Production company: Marvel Studios
- Distributed by: Walt Disney Studios Motion Pictures
- Release dates: July 21, 2025 (Dorothy Chandler Pavilion); July 25, 2025 (United States)
- Running time: 114 minutes
- Country: United States
- Language: English
- Budget: $229.6 million (gross); $181 million (net)
- Box office: $521.9 million

The Fantastic Four: First Steps is a 2025 American superhero film based on the Marvel Comics superhero team the Fantastic Four. Produced by Marvel Studios and distributed by Walt Disney Studios Motion Pictures, it is the 37th film in the Marvel Cinematic Universe (MCU) and the second reboot of the Fantastic Four film series. The film was directed by Matt Shakman from a screenplay by Josh Friedman, Eric Pearson, and the team of Jeff Kaplan and Ian Springer. It features an ensemble cast including Pedro Pascal, Vanessa Kirby, Ebon Moss-Bachrach, and Joseph Quinn as the titular team, alongside Julia Garner, Sarah Niles, Mark Gatiss, Natasha Lyonne, Paul Walter Hauser, and Ralph Ineson. The film is set in the 1960s of a retro-futuristic world which the Fantastic Four must protect from the planet-devouring cosmic being Galactus (Ineson).

20th Century Fox began work on a new Fantastic Four film following the failure of Fantastic Four (2015). After the studio was acquired by Disney in March 2019, control of the franchise was transferred to Marvel Studios, and a new film was announced that July. Jon Watts was set to direct in December 2020, but stepped down in April 2022. Shakman replaced him that September when Kaplan and Springer were working on the script. Casting began by early 2023, and Friedman joined in March to rewrite the script. The film is differentiated from previous Fantastic Four films by avoiding the team's origin story. Pearson joined to polish the script by mid-February 2024, when the main cast and the title The Fantastic Four were announced. The subtitle was added in July, when filming began. It took place until November 2024 at Pinewood Studios in England, and on location in England and Spain.

The Fantastic Four: First Steps premiered at the Dorothy Chandler Pavilion in Los Angeles on July 21, 2025, and was released in the United States on July 25, as the first film in Phase Six of the MCU. It received generally positive reviews from critics and grossed $521.9 million worldwide, making it the highest-grossing Fantastic Four film. A sequel is in development.

== Plot ==
On Earth-828 in 1964, the world celebrates the fourth anniversary of astronauts Reed Richards, Sue Storm, Ben Grimm, and Johnny Storm becoming the superhero team known as the Fantastic Four after they gained superhuman abilities from exposure to cosmic rays during a space mission. Since then, the team have become celebrities and fought supervillains, while Reed's inventions have progressed technology and Sue's diplomacy via the Future Foundation has led to demilitarization and peace for much of the world. When Reed and Sue reveal that they are expecting a child, the world prepares for the new arrival and questions whether the child will also have superpowers.

Months later, the Silver Surfer comes to Earth and declares that it has been marked for destruction by Galactus, a planet-devouring cosmic being. Reed studies the disappearance of other planets and verifies this claim, and the team decides to return to space to stop Galactus from coming to Earth. They track the Silver Surfer's energy signature and, using faster-than-light (FTL) travel, arrive at a new planet just as it is destroyed by Galactus's ship. The team is captured and brought to Galactus, who reveals that he has an insatiable hunger that has driven him to consume planets for eons. Galactus senses that Reed and Sue's unborn child has an immense cosmic power and could take on his hunger, freeing himself from it. He offers to spare Earth in exchange for the child, and induces Sue to go into labor. The team refuses the offer and escapes from the ship. Using the gravity from a neutron star, which destroys their FTL system, the team delays the chasing Silver Surfer and propels themselves back to Earth. Sue gives birth to a boy, Franklin, on the way.

On their return to Earth a month later, Reed reveals the details of their encounter during a press conference. Their decision to save one child over the billions of other people on Earth leads to a public outcry, with many calling for Franklin to be sacrificed to Galactus. Johnny begins to decipher the Silver Surfer's native language using his interactions with her and some deep space transmissions Reed intercepted from her planet. They also have transmissions from planets that Galactus destroyed. As Galactus draws near and protests against the Fantastic Four escalate, Sue takes Franklin to meet with protesters. She explains that they will not sacrifice their child, but they will also not give up on the rest of humanity, regaining public trust. Using a teleportation system that he has been working on, Reed devises a plan to build large teleportation bridges across Earth so they can transport the entire planet to another solar system where Galactus cannot reach them. Through the Future Foundation, Sue organizes the world's nations to build the bridges and conserve the energy needed to use them.

As the bridges are being activated, the Silver Surfer returns and begins destroying them. Johnny stops her from destroying the last bridge in Times Square and reveals what he learned from the transmissions: her name is Shalla-Bal and she became Galactus's herald to spare her world, Zenn-La. Hearing transmissions from planets she helped destroy, Shalla-Bal expresses remorse but refuses to help and flees. Using Franklin as bait, the team plans to lure Galactus to the last bridge and teleport him away. Sue negotiates with Harvey Elder to evacuate New York City's citizens to Subterranea, his underground city. Galactus makes his way through the city and captures Franklin, avoiding the trap. Sue uses all of her power to push him towards the portal with a force field while Reed rescues Franklin. Johnny attempts to sacrifice himself to give Galactus a final push into the portal, but is stopped by Shalla-Bal. She pushes Galactus into the portal herself and it closes behind them. Sue dies from her efforts, but is revived by Franklin. The team later goes on a new mission as the world celebrates their fifth anniversary.

In a mid-credits scene set four years later, Sue is reading to Franklin at home and goes to get a different book. She returns to see him interacting with a man in a green cloak who is holding a metal mask. (Note: This scene was directed by Avengers: Doomsday (2026) directors Anthony and Joe Russo during the production of that film. The man was identified off-screen as Victor von Doom / Doctor Doom.)

== Cast ==
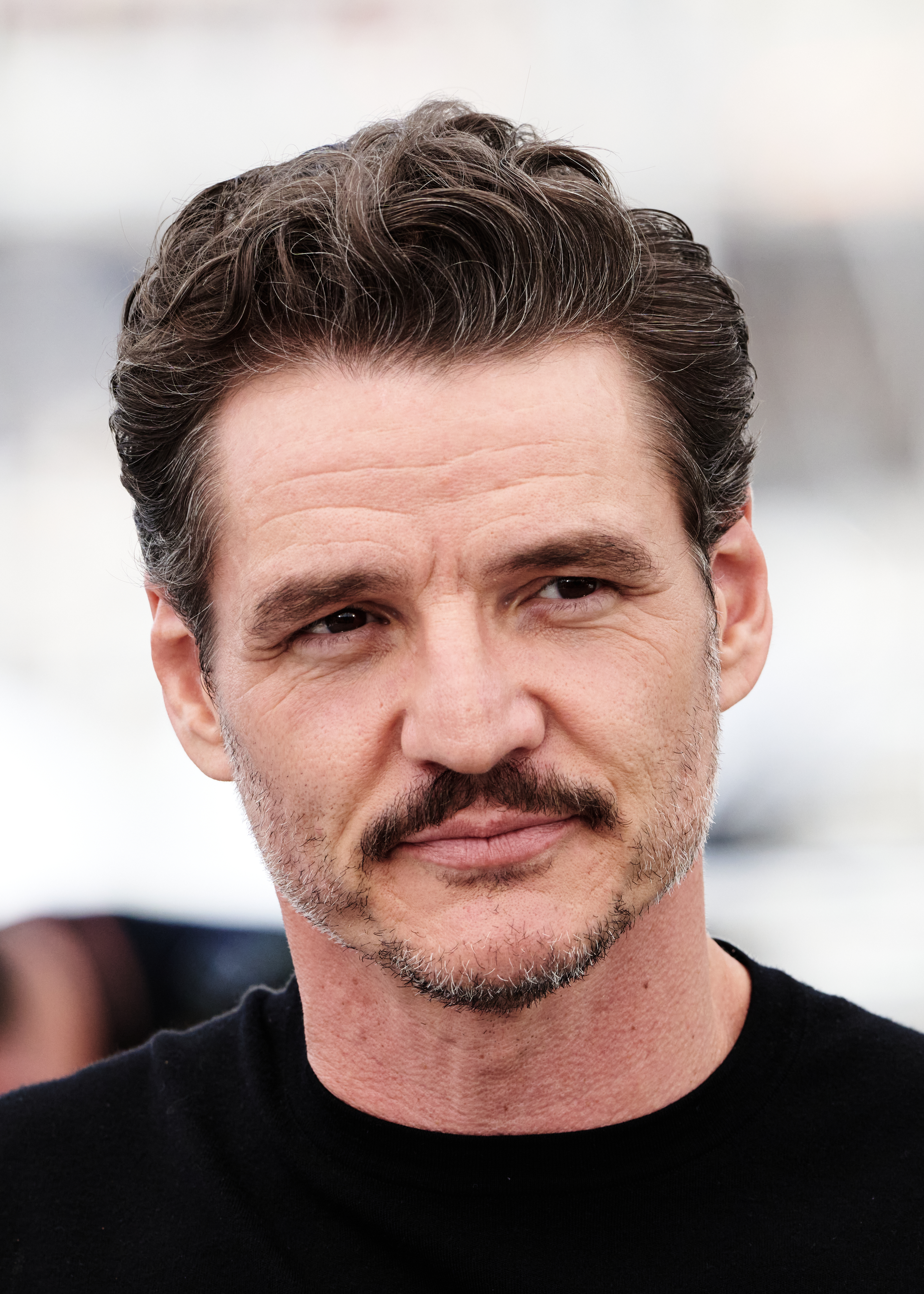
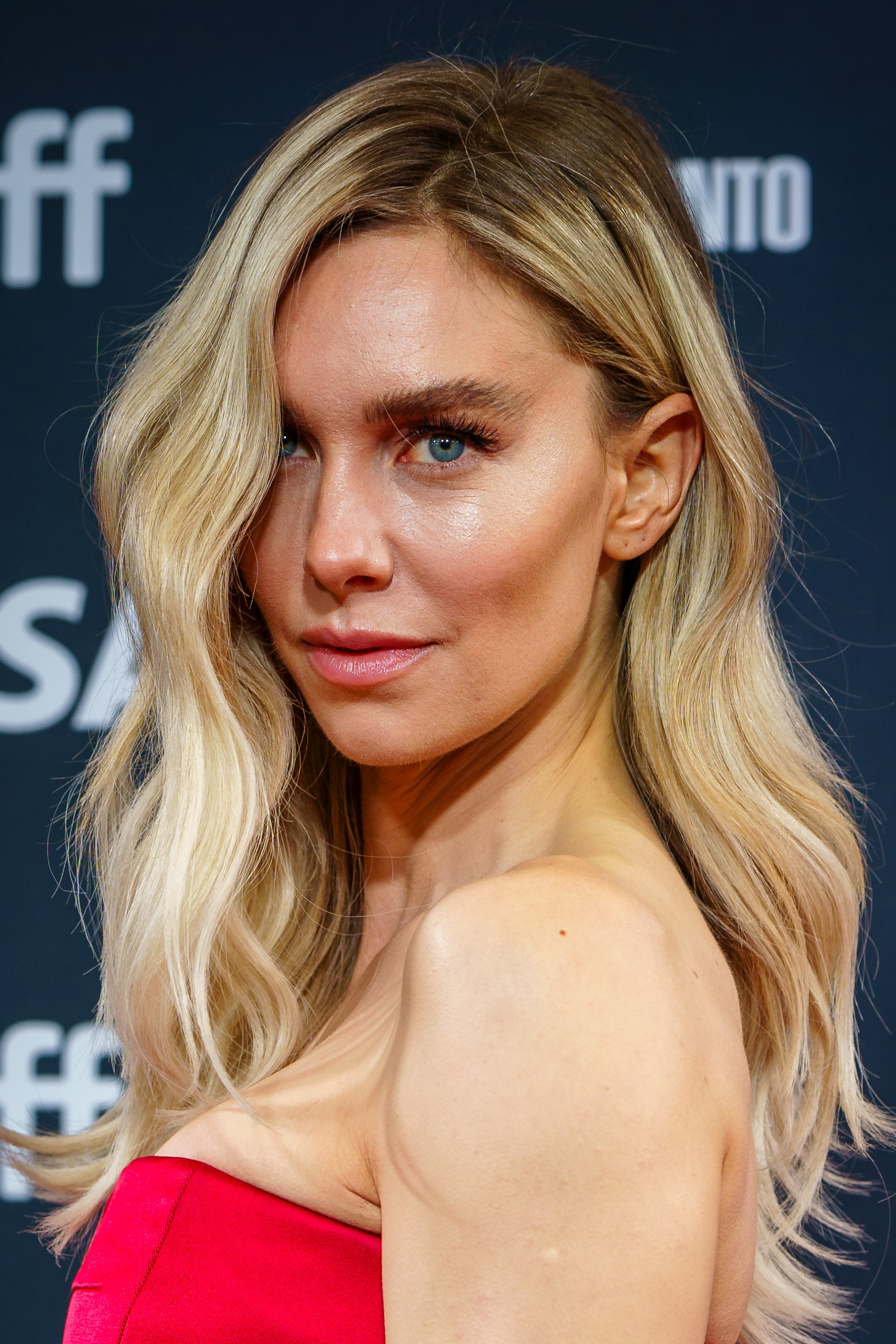
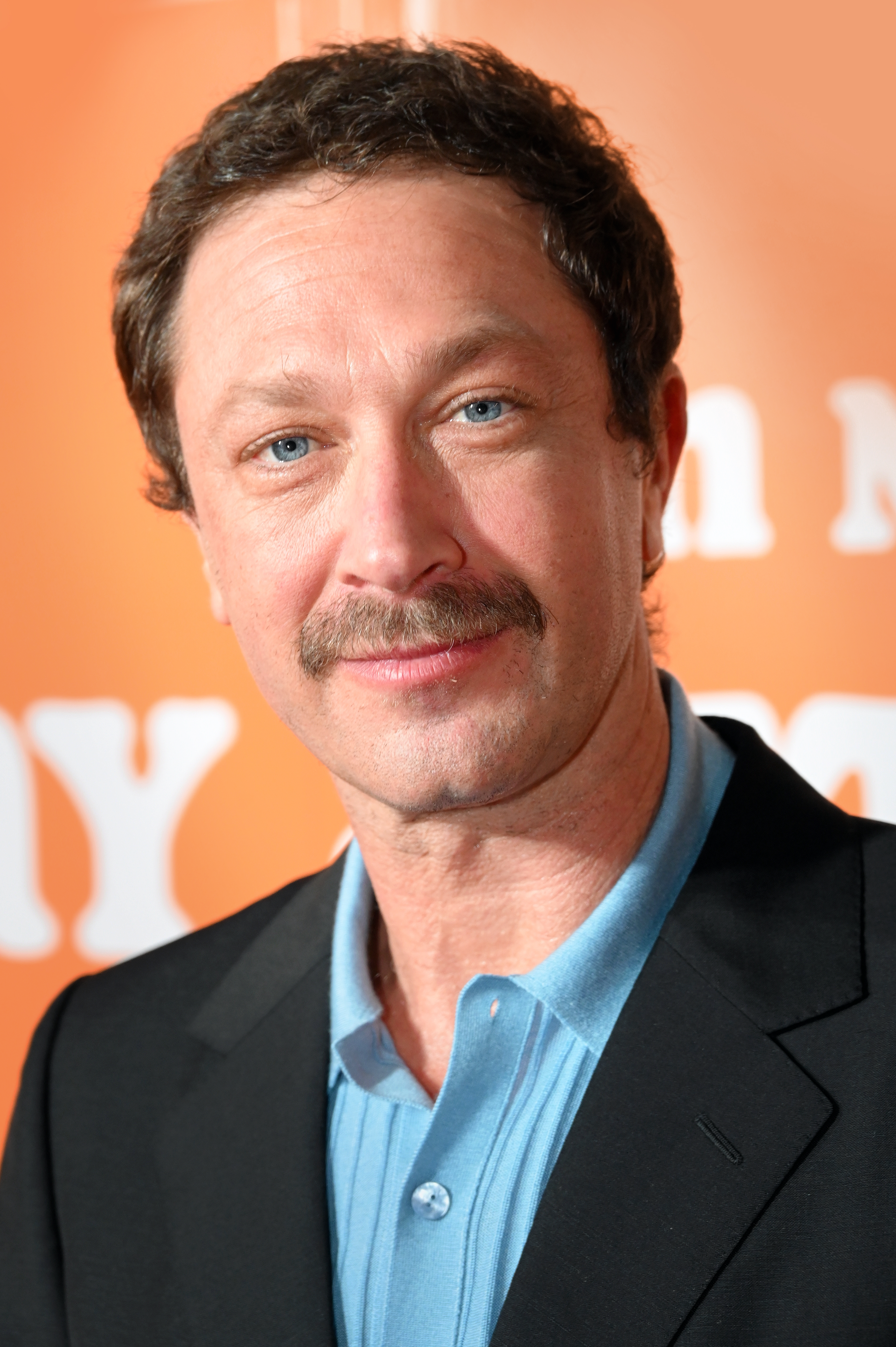
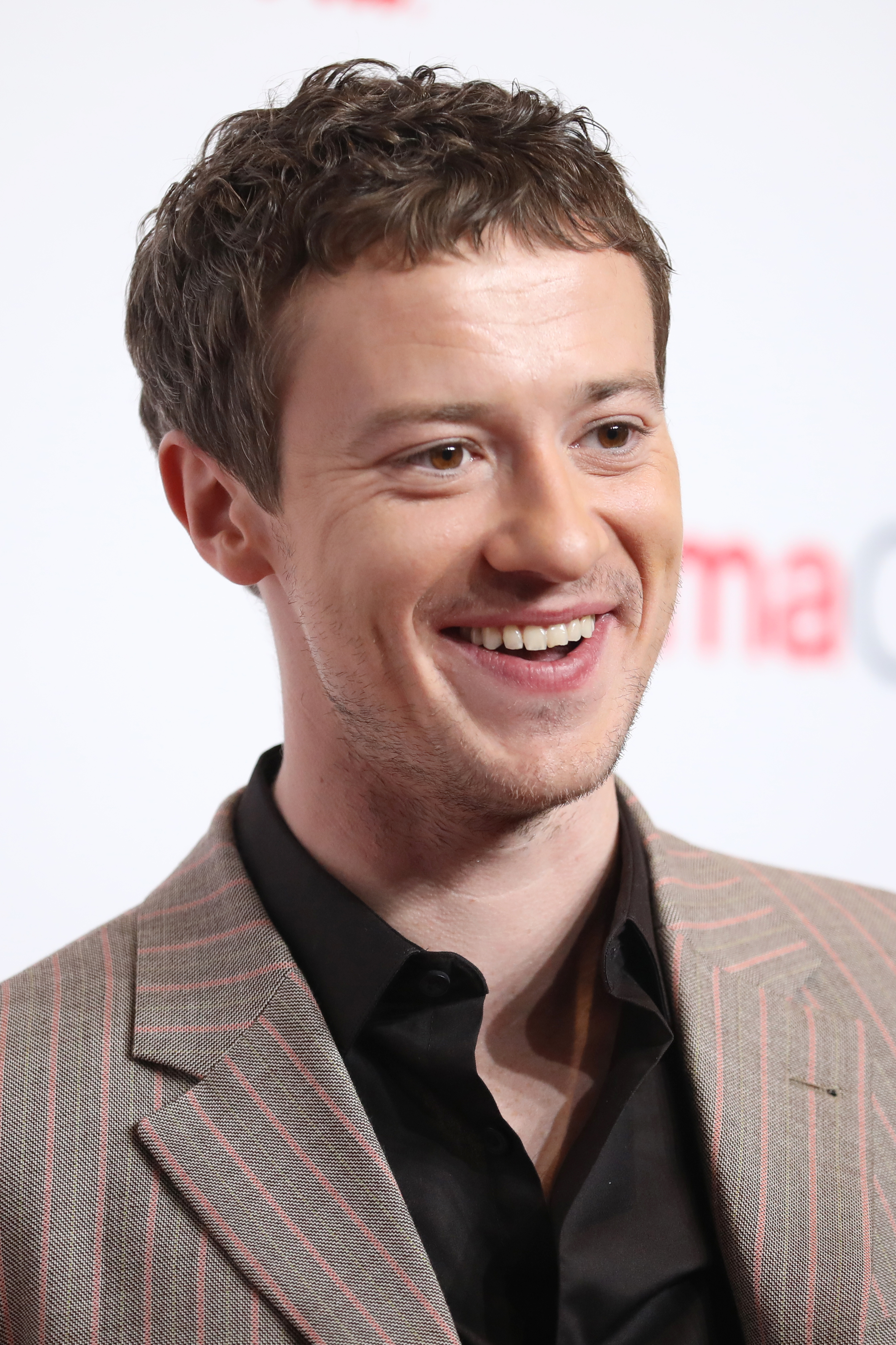
Pedro Pascal, Vanessa Kirby, Joseph Quinn, and Ebon Moss-Bachrach (clockwise from upper left) portray the eponymous team in the film.
- Pedro Pascal as Reed Richards / Mister Fantastic:
  A highly intelligent scientist and the leader of the Fantastic Four who can stretch any part of his body to great lengths. Director Matt Shakman described Reed as "the most scientifically intelligent person" on the planet, and a combination of Steve Jobs, Albert Einstein, and Robert Moses. Pascal said it was Reed's mind that was most important to him, rather than the character's physicality, and he considered "the brilliance of an octopus" when approaching the character. He also noted that he drew inspiration from many of the iterations of Reed from the comics, as opposed to previous portrayals of the character such as Ioan Gruffudd and Miles Teller in past Fantastic Four films, as well as John Krasinski in the Marvel Cinematic Universe (MCU) film Doctor Strange in the Multiverse of Madness (2022). Pascal wanted to give Reed a Mid-Atlantic accent, befitting the 1960s setting of First Steps, but Marvel Studios asked him to use his natural voice instead. Shakman said the character of Reed was the hardest to cast, but he found Pascal to be the best choice in part due to having a long-standing relationship working together in film.
- Vanessa Kirby as Sue Storm / Invisible Woman:
  Reed's pregnant wife, Johnny's older sister, and a member of the Fantastic Four who can generate force fields and turn invisible. She is the founder of the philanthropic organization Future Foundation, which has achieved global demilitarization and peace. Shakman described Sue as "the most emotionally intelligent person" on the planet. Kirby enjoyed synthesizing the various comic portrayals of Sue into her version of the character, focusing on motherhood as the through-line. The actress said she was obsessed with the comics run where Sue takes on the negative persona "Malice", and she included elements of that version in her portrayal so Sue would not be "the stereotype of a goody, sweet mother".
- Ebon Moss-Bachrach as Ben Grimm / The Thing:
  Reed's best friend, a former astronaut, and a member of the Fantastic Four whose skin has been transformed into a layer of near-impenetrable orange rock, granting him superhuman strength and durability. Throughout the film, the Thing grows a rocky beard, just like in the comics—specifically in Fantastic Four vol. 1 #605 (April 2012). Moss-Bachrach found comparisons between Grimm and his character Richie Jerimovich in the series The Bear (2022–2026), noting both were "deeply loyal people" and "fighters with a fierce sense of code, morality, and family". Moss-Bachrach portrays the Thing through motion capture and computer-generated imagery (CGI) rather than prosthetic makeup, and discussed that process with Mark Ruffalo, who portrays the Hulk in the MCU using the same technology. Portraying a character through motion capture was attractive to Moss-Bachrach because it gave him a freedom to experiment and "push [his] physicality as an actor". In addition to Moss-Bachrach performing his scenes in a motion-capture suit, some takes were re-filmed with the actor using different body extensions or a stand-in wearing a life-sized Thing costume to help the other actors reference the space that the character takes up. Moss-Bachrach felt it was beneficial to be on set with his other actors, who were able to look at him as Ben Grimm rather than the Thing. Shakman consulted scientists and studied desert rocks to find the best reference for the Thing's appearance; a specific desert rock that matched his desired look for the Thing, referred to as "Jennifer", was also filmed on set as a lighting reference for the visual effects team.
- Joseph Quinn as Johnny Storm / Human Torch:
  Sue's younger brother and a member of the Fantastic Four who can control fire and fly. While Quinn was a fan of Chris Evans's portrayal of the character in the 20th Century Fox films Fantastic Four (2005) and Fantastic Four: Rise of the Silver Surfer (2007), he did not base his portrayal on Evans's. Quinn and producer Kevin Feige discussed Johnny's womanizing in previous portrayals and concluded that this would not be considered "sexy" by modern audiences. Quinn wanted his version to be "less callous with other people's feelings" and more self-aware of his attention-seeking behavior, while still having a lot of bravado and humor. Shakman noted that Johnny is also smart and heroic, despite undercutting that with jokes.
- Julia Garner as Shalla-Bal / Silver Surfer:
  A former scientist from the utopian alien planet Zenn-La who agreed to become Galactus's latest herald in exchange for him sparing her planet. Shalla-Bal's entire body is coated in a "space polymer" that gives her a metallic appearance, and she travels through space on a surfboard-like craft in search of planets for Galactus to feed on. The Power Cosmic bestowed upon Shalla-Bal by Galactus grants her various abilities, including: superhuman strength, durability, and agility; faster-than-light (FTL) travel; energy manipulation; and intangibility. Garner portrays the Silver Surfer through motion capture. She said there was a "mysterious energy" to the character and her relationship with Galactus. To prepare for the role, Garner took surfing lessons, despite her fear of the ocean, to familiarize herself with the board and move like a surfer, as well as combining research on surfing poses with statuesque non-surf poses from the comics to have the character "[move] elegantly, like a dance".
- Sarah Niles as Lynne Nichols: The Chief of Staff of the Future Foundation
- Mark Gatiss as Ted Gilbert: The host of a popular talk show called The Ted Gilbert Show
- Natasha Lyonne as Rachel Rozman:
  A school teacher and Grimm's love interest. Commentators believed the character was named as a tribute to Rosalind "Roz" Goldstein, wife of Fantastic Four co-creator Jack Kirby.
- Paul Walter Hauser as Harvey Elder / Mole Man:
  A former enemy turned ally of the Fantastic Four and the human ruler of Subterranea, an underground society whose inhabitants refer to themselves as Moloids. Shakman compared Elder to a leader of a labor union with humanity and a focus on community and taking care of his people.
- Ralph Ineson as Galactus:
  A gigantic cosmic being who consumes the life force of planets to satiate his endless hunger. Galactus is the sole survivor of a dead universe that existed before the creation of Earth-828. Shakman called him a "humongous, 14-billion-year-old, planet-devouring cosmic vampire". Ineson did not think Galactus was evil, calling him a "god of sorts" and a "big, planet-eating guy, simply doing what a big, planet-eating guy does". The actor spent time "ruminating" at the top of tall buildings to prepare for the role. Feige loved Galactus's introduction in the comics—depicted in Fantastic Four vol. 1 #48–50 (1966), known as "The Galactus Trilogy"—and had long wanted to use him. Ineson stated that Galactus does not care about a planet's life since "it's his food", only sparing them if there is something that "interests" him there. Feige shared a clip of the character from the video game Fortnite Battle Royale (2017) as a reference for how he should be portrayed. The film uses a comic-accurate look for Galactus, in contrast to the cloud-like design with which he was portrayed in Rise of the Silver Surfer. A practical version of Galactus' purple and blue armor, weighing approximately 350 pounds (160 kg), was built for Ineson to wear, as it was important to Shakman that someone was "embodying the part". Ineson had a support crew to keep him cool between takes because of the armor, which was also intended to aid the motion capture process.

Additionally, Matthew Wood voices the Fantastic Four's robot companion H.E.R.B.I.E. (Humanoid Experimental Robot B-Type Integrated Electronics), who generally serves as Reed's assistant. Shakman said H.E.R.B.I.E. is charming, adorable, "slightly put-upon", and invaluable to the team, with the robot's capabilities varying according to the data tape inserted into his head. Ada Scott and several other babies portray Franklin Richards, the superpowered newborn son of Reed and Sue, while Shakman's daughter Maisie appears as a child Johnny saves. Alex Hyde-White, Rebecca Staab, Jay Underwood, and Michael Bailey Smith, who portrayed the eponymous team in the unreleased 1994 film The Fantastic Four, make cameo appearances: Hyde-White and Staab respectively play television journalists William Russell and Carolyn Haynes; Underwood and Smith play power plant workers who salute Johnny; and all four appear together as civilians thanking the Fantastic Four. Martin Dickinson and Greg Haiste appear as Timely Comics employees who are creating comics when the Silver Surfer arrives in Times Square. They are references to Fantastic Four creators Stan Lee and Jack Kirby. Robert Downey Jr. makes an uncredited cameo appearance in the mid-credits scene as Victor von Doom / Doctor Doom. While his face is not seen, Vanessa Kirby confirmed that Downey filmed the scene during the production of the MCU film Avengers: Doomsday (2026).

== Production ==
=== Background ===
After the critical and commercial failure of 20th Century Fox's 2015 film Fantastic Four, co-written and directed by Josh Trank and based on the Marvel Comics superhero team the Fantastic Four, Fox began looking at new directions to take the franchise. Having also produced two earlier Fantastic Four films directed by Tim Story a decade prior, the studio did not want to just make another Fantastic Four film. By June 2017, Seth Grahame-Smith was writing a new film that would shift focus to Franklin and Valeria Richards, the children of the original Fantastic Four leaders Reed Richards / Mister Fantastic and Sue Storm / Invisible Woman. Taking inspiration from the comic book series Ultimate Fantastic Four (2004–2009), the screenplay included original Fantastic Four members Ben Grimm / The Thing and Johnny Storm / Human Torch, and was described as kid-centric with a tone closer to the animated film The Incredibles (2004) than Trank's darker film. The basis of Grahame-Smith's screenplay came from a separate script that Carter Blanchard had written as an adaptation of the unpublished children's book Kindergarten Heroes by Mark Millar. Millar previously consulted with Fox on their Marvel-based films. In July 2017, Noah Hawley, the creator of the Marvel Television series Legion (2017–2019), was hired to develop a separate film focused on Victor von Doom / Doctor Doom, the Fantastic Four's primary antagonist in the comics and previous films. The Walt Disney Company officially acquired 21st Century Fox in March 2019 and gained the film rights for the Marvel Comics characters that Fox controlled for its subsidiary Marvel Studios, including the Fantastic Four. The Marvel-based films that Fox had been developing were placed "on hold".

=== Development ===
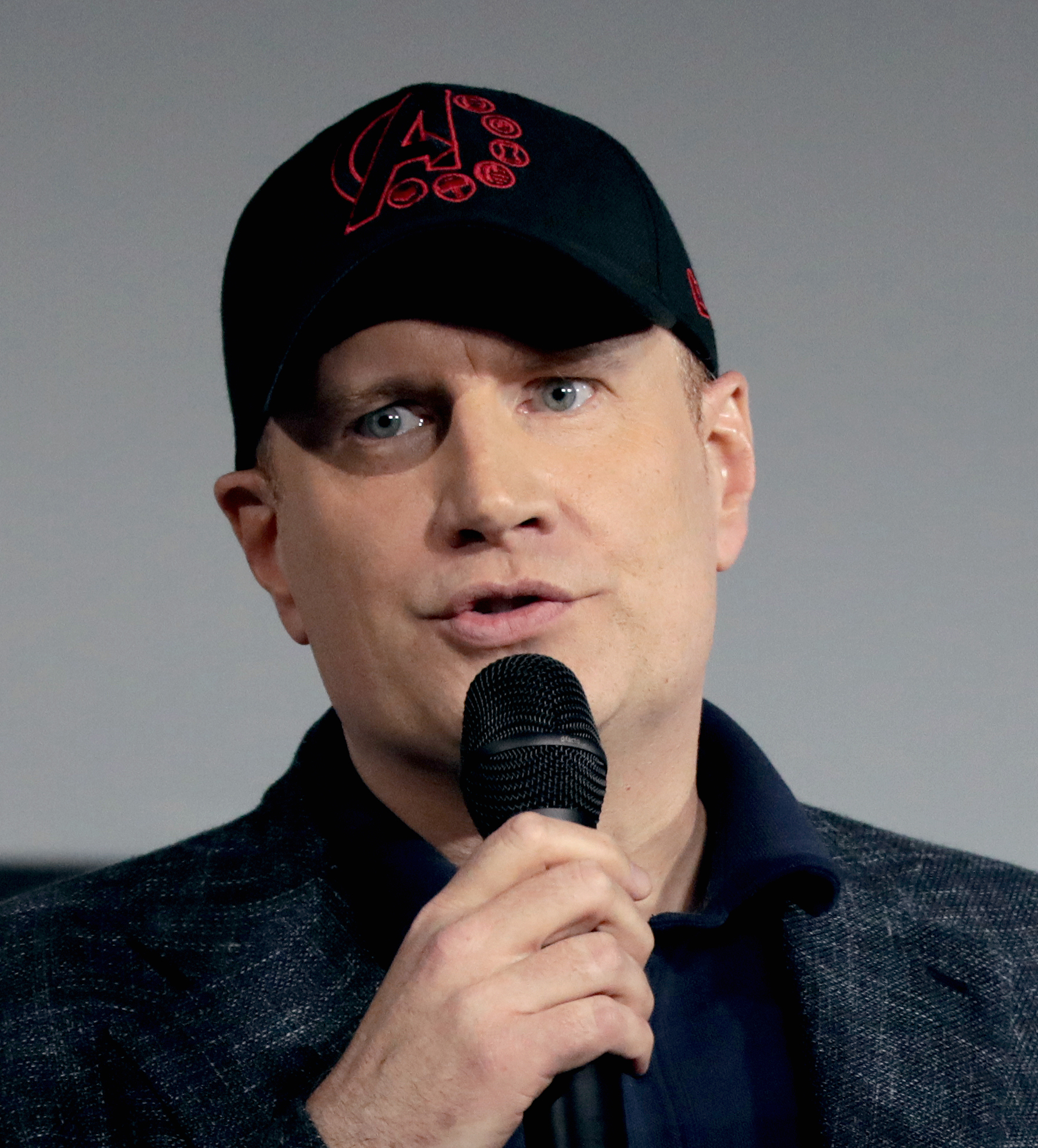
Producer Kevin Feige at San Diego Comic-Con in July 2019, where he confirmed that development had begun

Marvel Studios president Kevin Feige confirmed in July 2019 that the company was developing a new Fantastic Four film for their shared universe, the Marvel Cinematic Universe (MCU). Feige said he was excited about the characters and about "bringing Marvel's first family up to the sort of platform and level they deserve", wanting them to take their rightful place within the "pantheon of Marvel heroes" and bring the importance they had in the comic books like those that had inspired the MCU, such as Jim Starlin's "The Infinity Gauntlet" (1991) and Millar's "Civil War" (2006–2007) storylines, which included the Fantastic Four but whose MCU adaptations did not because of the film rights issues at the time. In December 2020, Feige announced that Jon Watts would direct the film after doing so for the first three MCU Spider-Man films (2017–2021). Marvel Studios began meeting with writers by February 2021. That June, Disney CEO Bob Chapek said Feige and Marvel Studios were planning to "mine" the Fantastic Four franchise. Watts stepped down as director in April 2022, choosing to take a break from the superhero genre after being "out of gas" from dealing with the COVID-19 protocols on the MCU film Spider-Man: No Way Home (2021) and its post-production process; he chose to direct the film Wolfs (2024) instead. Grant Curtis and Nick Pepin were producing the new Fantastic Four film after working on the Marvel Studios miniseries Moon Knight (2022).

John Krasinski portrays Reed Richards / Mister Fantastic in the MCU film Doctor Strange in the Multiverse of Madness (2022). Krasinski had been a popular suggestion for the role among fans for some time, and rumors that he had been cast as Reed had especially circulated since confirmation of the new film's development. The version of the character that he plays in Multiverse of Madness is from Earth-838—an alternate universe to the MCU's main timeline, Earth-616 (also referred to as the Sacred Timeline)—and is a member of the Illuminati. This version of Reed is killed, along with most of that team, by Wanda Maximoff / Scarlet Witch. Multiverse of Madness director Sam Raimi said Feige cast Krasinski as the character because it was for an alternate universe cameo appearance that was also an opportunity to deliver on a popular fan casting. This led to speculation about whether Krasinski's role was a one-off or if he would return to star in the new Fantastic Four film. Krasinski later said he appreciated the role, but there had been no discussions about him reprising it.

Marvel Studios was searching for a new director by June 2022, when the studio was not close to shortening their list of candidates. The list reportedly included high-profile filmmakers, and Feige was said to be looking for a director who could oversee the filming process without him needing to be on set, similar to Raimi. At San Diego Comic-Con (SDCC) the next month, Feige announced that the film would be released on November 8, 2024, as the first film in Phase Six of the MCU. Filming was set to begin in 2023. Matt Shakman was in early talks to direct by late August. He and Michael Matthews were considered the finalists in a search that also considered Reid Carolin. Deadline Hollywood said Shakman was the person to beat given his familiarity with Feige after directing the Marvel Studios miniseries WandaVision (2021). Shakman's pitch to Marvel Studios involved telling a family-centric story of the Fantastic Four, with Reed and Sue becoming parents after they were well-known superheroes; executives were convinced Shakman was the best choice after he showed a picture of him holding his newly born daughter in a meeting while negotiating. Shakman subsequently exited a planned Star Trek film due to the schedule for Fantastic Four, choosing to work on the latter because he did not want to pass up the opportunity and was excited by its focus on family, optimism, and technology. Feige confirmed that Shakman would direct at Disney's D23 convention in September. Jeff Kaplan and Ian Springer were writing the script with Feige for some time before Shakman's hiring. The four were set to align their visions for the film while Feige and Shakman began casting. In October, the release date was pushed back to February 14, 2025.

=== Pre-production ===
==== Casting start and search during the 2023 labor strikes ====
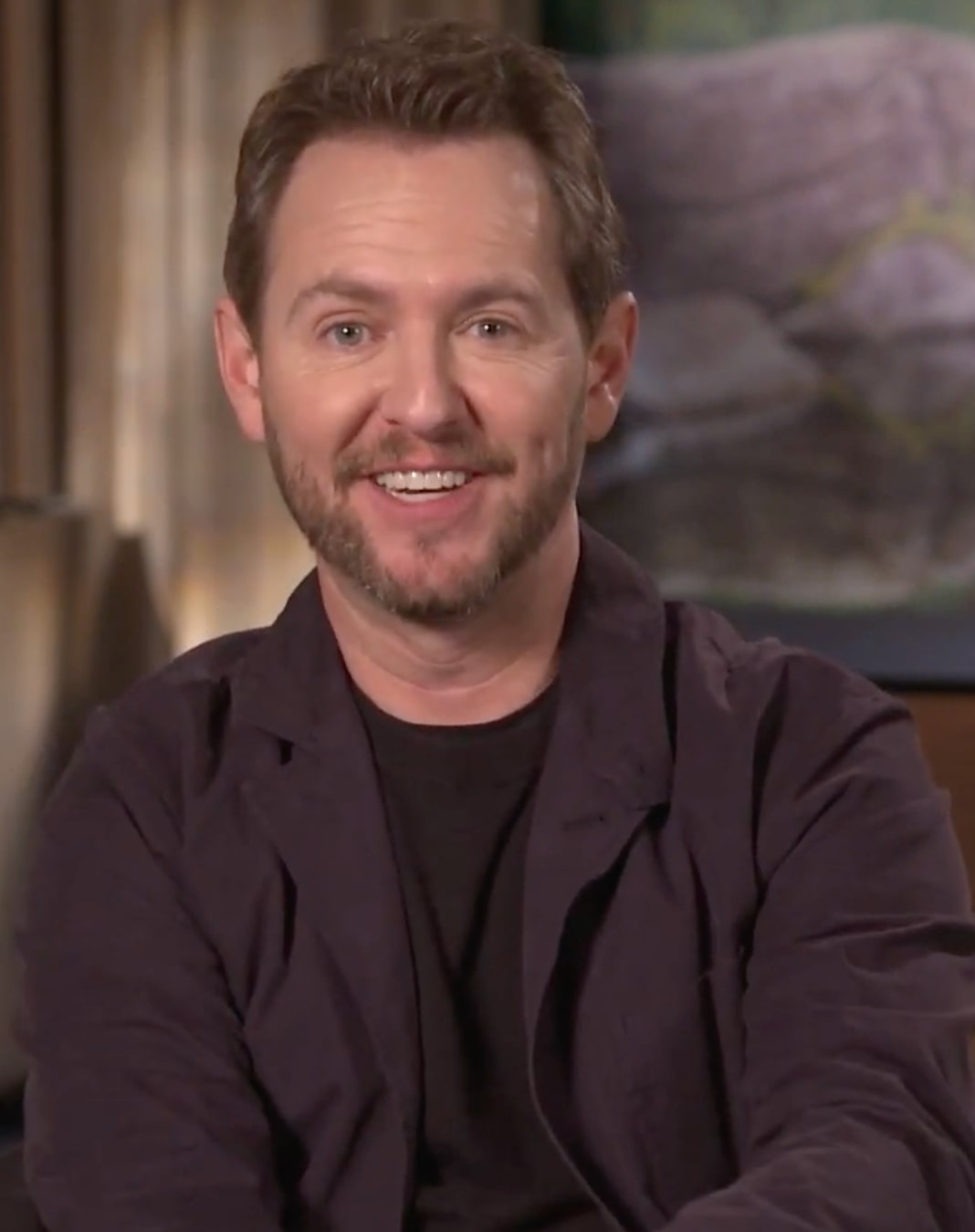
Matt Shakman was hired to direct the film by September 2022.

Casting for the Fantastic Four began by February 2023, with a focus on casting the role of Sue Storm / Invisible Woman first. Shakman said the casting process was the biggest challenge because they wanted to find actors who could convey the team's family dynamics. Feige said the group would be a big pillar in the MCU moving forward, and the studio had "set a very high bar for ourselves" in wanting to live up to the group's long history in the comics going back to 1961. Josh Friedman was hired to rewrite the script at the end of March. Borys Kit of The Hollywood Reporter believed Friedman's hiring indicated a possible tonal shift, because he had written many science fiction projects while Kaplan and Springer were known more for comedy. Journalist Jeff Sneider reported that Friedman was hired to bring the film closer to Feige and Shakman's vision to heavily feature cosmic elements from the 1960s comic books, including the characters Galactus and Silver Surfer. Shakman noted that previous Fantastic Four adaptations combined an origin story for the team with Doctor Doom, a character who "takes up a lot of air", as the villain. By avoiding a re-telling of the origin story—the film begins four years after the team gains their powers—and using Galactus as the antagonist, he felt they were bringing a fresh perspective to the film. Feige said the decision to avoid re-telling the origin story was similar to how the MCU introduced Peter Parker / Spider-Man without retelling his well-known origin story. Another difference is the introduction of Reed and Sue's son Franklin Richards, who was not included in previous film adaptations. Sneider reported that Victor von Doom / Doctor Doom could have a small role such as a cameo appearance in a post-credits scene, and Marvel Studios wanted a major star to play the character.

By the start of the 2023 Writers Guild of America strike in May, filming was planned to begin in January 2024 in London. Sneider reported that Marvel Studios wanted Adam Driver and Emma Stone to portray Reed and Sue, but they both declined offers in part because the studio did not want to pay the high salaries they asked for; Sneider said Feige wanted to contain the studio's talent spending. In June, the release date was pushed back to May 2, 2025. Before the start of the 2023 SAG-AFTRA strike in July, Marvel Studios held screen tests for Reed with several actors, including Christopher Abbott and Jamie Dornan, which Sneider said "did not go very well". The studio offered the role to Jake Gyllenhaal, who previously portrayed Quentin Beck / Mysterio in the MCU film Spider-Man: Far From Home (2019), but he also asked for a salary that Marvel did not want to pay. They were considering non-white actors for Reed and Pedro Pascal became interested, though he would not engage in conversations during the strike. In August, Ebon Moss-Bachrach was offered the role of Ben Grimm / The Thing, after playing David Lieberman / Micro in the first season of the MCU television series The Punisher (2017). Marvel Studios was committed to casting a Jewish actor like Moss-Bachrach as the Thing, who is depicted as Jewish in the comics but was not portrayed by Jewish actors in the previous Fantastic Four films. David Krumholtz met with Shakman about the role after campaigning for it online, but was unsuccessful. He began campaigning to portray the villain Harvey Elder / Mole Man instead. Sneider reported that Marvel Studios was looking at Vanessa Kirby and Joseph Quinn to portray Sue and her younger brother Johnny Storm / Human Torch. Nicholas Galitzine was also rumored to be portraying Johnny and had conversations about the role. Marvel approached Matt Smith about portraying Reed, but that was not expected to work out, and they were instead looking for "a bona fide movie star". Tom Ellis was also asked to audition for the role. A Latino actor was expected to be hired as Galactus.

In October 2023, Shakman said they planned to start filming in early 2024 at Pinewood Studios in England, and the cast would be announced once the SAG-AFTRA strike ended. During the strikes, the crew worked on production design and early tests of the visual effects for the team's abilities. Kasra Farahani returned as production designer from the Marvel Studios series Loki (2021–2023) and Alexandra Byrne returned as costume designer from several MCU films. The filmmakers chose to embrace the line design of Fantastic Four co-creator Jack Kirby from the comics, and worked with the production designer to get more Kirby designs into shots and backgrounds, such as in Galactus's helmet. The costumes worn by the Fantastic Four in the film are pale blue and, with the exception of Reed's, have white necklines, similar to the designs introduced in the comics with Fantastic Four vol. 1 #256 (1983) and those worn in Roger Corman's unreleased The Fantastic Four film (1994). The team briefly wears their original costumes from the comics at the beginning of the film. They also wear two different sets of space suits that Byrne said were inspired by those used in NASA's Gemini and Mercury programs during the 1950s and 1960s. Concept artist Seth Engstrom helped conceive the design for the comic book character H.E.R.B.I.E., a robot companion to the Fantastic Four, and stated that Marvel Studios wanted to "hold true to the classic [H.E.R.B.I.E.] while exploring different possibilities for what the robot could be". Engstrom added that household appliances and other everyday items served as inspiration for H.E.R.B.I.E.'s appearance.

==== Post-labor strikes and cast announcement ====
Following the conclusion of the actors' strike in November 2023, Pascal entered talks to portray Reed and was negotiating his schedule around other commitments. Marvel Studios was expected to make offers for the other lead roles soon after, having deemed it essential to find the actor for Reed first. According to Shakman, Reed was the most difficult role to cast. Moss-Bachrach was the first actor officially cast in the film. Quinn sought advice on the film from Pascal during the production of their film Gladiator II (2024), not knowing that Pascal was in talks to play Reed. Pascal had not planned to take on such a role and said the film changed his plans "in a very sudden way". Javier Bardem was being eyed to portray Galactus after Antonio Banderas was linked to the character, though Bardem had a potential scheduling conflict with the film F1 (2025). Sneider reported that the studio was looking to cast a woman as the Silver Surfer, who is usually the male character Norrin Radd. In January 2024, Sneider reported that filming had been delayed to a start between July and September, causing Pascal to exit his role in the film Weapons (2025).

The Valentine's Day–themed artwork released by Marvel Studios in February 2024 to confirm the casting for the titular team. This led to speculation about the film's 1960s-inspired setting.

On February 14, 2024, Marvel Studios released a Valentine's Day–themed announcement that confirmed the casting of Pascal as Reed, Kirby as Sue, Quinn as Johnny, and Moss-Bachrach as the Thing. The film, officially titled The Fantastic Four, was delayed to July 25, 2025, swapping places with the MCU film Thunderbolts*. Feige said "90 percent of the work was done" by confirming the main cast. The announcement's promotional art revealed the inclusion of H.E.R.B.I.E. in The Fantastic Four, marking the character's first live-action appearance. A deactivated version of H.E.R.B.I.E. was slated for a brief cameo in Fox's 2005 film Fantastic Four, but the scene was ultimately cut. The promotional art also included the December 13, 1963, issue of Life magazine with Lyndon B. Johnson on the cover, indicating a 1960s setting, and Pascal referenced 1960s songs from the Beatles when sharing the promotional art on social media. Feige later confirmed that the film would be a 1960s period piece, but indicated that it would be set in a universe alternative to Earth-616 within the multiverse; it is set on Earth-828. Setting the story in an alternate universe was "very freeing" and one of the film's earliest ideas. The decision came about due to Shakman acknowledging that the source material's comic books were created by Jack Kirby and Stan Lee in the 1960s back when people dreamed about the stars and the unknown, wanting to put them "closer to their point of origin", and because Shakman did not want a plot hole in regards to where the titular team may have been when Thanos attacked and killed most of the heroes in the MCU crossover film Avengers: Infinity War (2018). Shakman called it a "retro-future '60s" aesthetic, "part what you know from the '60s, but part what you've never seen". He looked to the optimism of the Space Race and ideas of future space travelers that people had in the 1960s when the comics were first written. Shakman stated, "I really wanted to take all of that great stuff from Apollo 11 and just imagine that instead of Neil Armstrong and Buzz Aldrin, it was the Storms and Ben Grimm and Reed Richards heading off into space". The idea of a Fantastic Four film set in the mid-20th century had previously been considered by Peyton Reed when he was attached to direct Fox's Fantastic Four; he ultimately left the project and later directed the MCU film Ant-Man (2015) and its two sequels, Ant-Man and the Wasp (2018) and Ant-Man and the Wasp: Quantumania (2023). Shakman studied all of the Fantastic Four comics, from their original creation up to present day, and took particular inspiration from Jonathan Hickman's run on Fantastic Four vol. 3 #570–588 (2009–2011) for how to approach the main characters. The Fantastic Four includes the philanthropic organization Future Foundation, which was introduced during that same run. Shakman was also inspired by the films 2001: A Space Odyssey (1968) and Blade Runner (1982), as well as the works of industrial designer and artist Syd Mead. He said his work on the television series It's Always Sunny in Philadelphia (2005–present) helped inform his approach to the film's playfulness, collaboration, and improvisation.

Also in February 2024, Sneider reported that Bardem was the studio's top choice for Galactus; they had begun meeting with actors for Silver Surfer; and Doctor Doom would be cast during filming. Eric Pearson, who had a reputation for "taking projects over the finish line" for Marvel Studios, had been "quietly hired" to polish the script. In April, Julia Garner was cast as Shalla-Bal / Silver Surfer. In the comics, Shalla-Bal is not the Silver Surfer, but rather the love interest—and occasionally an adversary—of Norrin Radd. However, an alternate version of her becomes the second Silver Surfer alongside Radd as "twin heralds" of Galactus in the 1999–2000 Earth-X limited series by Jim Krueger and John Paul Leon. Justin Kroll of Deadline Hollywood reported that no actors held an offer or were in talks for Galactus at that time. WandaVision writer Peter Cameron had contributed to the script by the following month. Several actors joined the cast in May, including Paul Walter Hauser in the role of Harvey Elder / Mole Man, reportedly for a sequence at the beginning of the film. Hauser worked with Shakman on It's Always Sunny in Philadelphia and met with him to discuss joining The Fantastic Four. He was initially reluctant due to the poor reception of the previous Fantastic Four films, but was won over by the script, cast, and crew. John Malkovich was cast as Ivan Kragoff / Red Ghost, after declining offers for previous Marvel films because he felt the proposed pay was not equal to the work involved. He chose to accept a role in this film to work with Shakman again after the film Cut Bank (2014). Ralph Ineson was cast as Galactus, after appearing as a Ravager pilot in the MCU film Guardians of the Galaxy (2014); Sneider posited that Marvel chose Ineson for his voice acting proficiency, not wanting for another A-list actor after failing to pull Bardem due to the scheduling difficulties. Natasha Lyonne also joined the cast, after voicing the original MCU character Byrdie the Duck in the third season of the Marvel Studios animated series What If...? (2024).

Three weeks of rehearsals were held with the actors to work through the script with Shakman and Friedman to help define their relationships to one another and how they would exist in their 1960s retro-futuristic setting. Discussing these rehearsals, Pascal explained that it allowed the actors to approach the script "dramaturgically as you would a play" while Moss-Bachrach, who believed the script was not completed yet, said it allowed them to share research and consult with astronauts and scientists. At the end of June 2024, Feige said filming would begin at the end of July. A few days of pre-filming occurred before SDCC in late July, capturing footage of an astronaut preparation area, the Thing as a contestant on a dating game show titled Let's Make a Match, and a children's science show hosted by Reed titled Fantastic Science with Mister Fantastic. The Let's Make a Match scene was not included in the final cut of the film. At the convention, the film's new title was announced to be The Fantastic Four: First Steps. The subtitle references the film's ideas of optimism and space exploration, but Shakman said it also has additional meanings. This led to speculation about what those meanings could be. Also at SDCC, the main cast were revealed to be reprising their roles in the MCU crossover films Avengers: Doomsday (2026) and Avengers: Secret Wars (2027), and Robert Downey Jr. was announced to be portraying Doctor Doom in those two films. Feige wanted Downey to return to the MCU, after he portrayed Tony Stark / Iron Man in the franchise from 2008 to 2019, and had discussed the actor taking on the role of Doom around a year before the SDCC announcement. Sneider reported that Doom would be introduced in a post-credits scene at the end of First Steps ahead of Downey's appearances in the Avengers films. Shakman said he knew about Downey's casting for a while before the announcement, but he later said Doctor Doom was "not a part of [his] film, and therefore not a part of [his] purview". Feige later added that the events of First Steps would lead directly into the story of Doomsday.

=== Filming ===
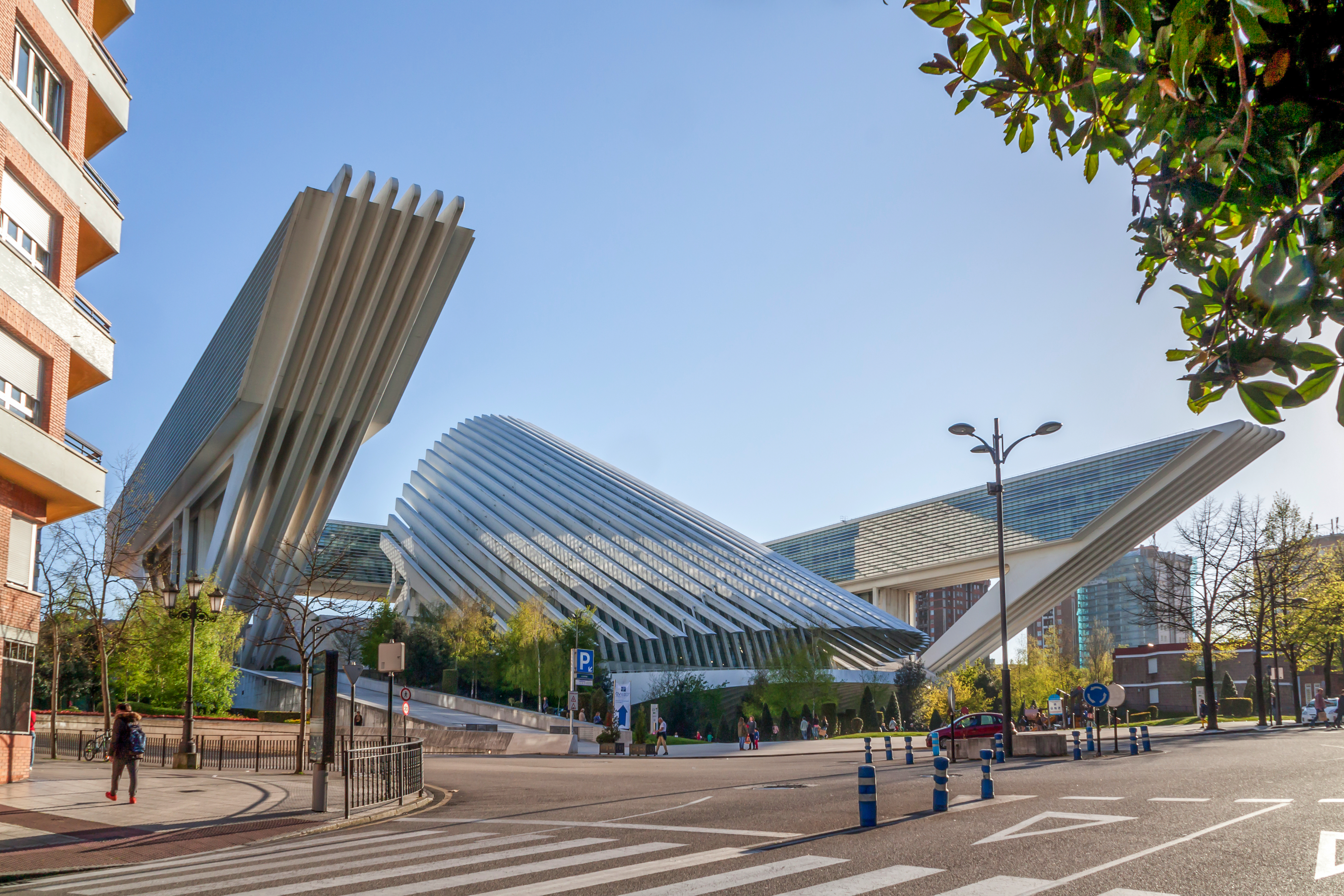
Location filming took place at the Palace of Congresses in Oviedo, Spain, which doubled as the lobby of the Baxter Building and the assembly hall of the Future Foundation.

Principal photography began on July 30, 2024, at Pinewood Studios in Buckinghamshire, England, under the working title Blue Moon. The film was shot for IMAX, with Jess Hall returning from WandaVision as cinematographer. Filming was originally reported to be starting in 2023, and then early 2024, before the strikes. Shakman wanted the film to look as if it were made by 2001: A Space Odyssey director Stanley Kubrick in 1965, including with its camera lens choices and general "approach to filmmaking". Second unit director of photography Tim Wooster used his father's 16 mm film camera for some sequences. Practical sets and props were employed whenever possible, with most of the film's locations—including the Baxter Building, Times Square, and Yancy Street—created on 30 sets spread across eight sound stages on the two backlots of Pinewood Studios; one of these backlots was used in its entirety for the Times Square set, the area of which was 22% smaller than the actual Times Square. Real-life establishments from the 1960s—such as Horn & Hardart, Whelan's, Leighton's, RKO Palace, Embassy Theatre, and Forum Cinema—were recreated on that set. Imaginarium Studios—founded by Andy Serkis, who portrays the character Ulysses Klaue in the MCU, and based at Pinewood Studios—assisted with and enhanced the motion capture process performed by both Moss-Bachrach and Garner for First Steps. Garner filmed her scenes on a real surfboard to lend realism to her movements and positioning, seeking to understand the "possibilities achievable" with the Silver Surfer's cosmic board, while also focusing on the character's "silhouette and shape" during her performance. Garner also shared most of her scenes with Quinn.

The retro-futuristic design of New York City in the film was based on the work of architects such as Eero Saarinen and Oscar Niemeyer, as well as illustrators such as Mead, John Berkey, Charles Schridde, and Arthur Radebaugh. The Baxter Building, headquarters and residence of the Fantastic Four, is located at the site of the headquarters of the United Nations (UN) in Midtown Manhattan, and the base of the building also serves as the headquarters of the Future Foundation. The penthouse of the Baxter Building was a two-story contiguous set inspired by "cozy" mid-century modern California homes. Described as a "cabin within a penthouse", the space featured warm-toned wood paneling, a central fireplace, a sunken seating area, and a kitchen—the latter designed based on futuristic exhibits from the 1964 New York World's Fair, as well as Frigidaire's 1956 "Kitchen of Tomorrow" concept. Another key location within the Baxter Building is Reed's lab, inspired by 2001: A Space Odyssey, which is divided into three sections: a red room for research and inventions, a yellow room with blackboards for thinking, and a blue room with communications equipment for monitoring. A fictionalized version of New York's Yancy Street was built based on how the city's Jewish areas looked during the childhood of Jack Kirby, including kosher grocery stores and a synagogue. Set decorator Jille Azis, who worked on the film, said the filmmakers wanted Yancy Street to "feel like part of the normal world, not the futuristic one", stating that "[w]hen Ben Grimm visits, it feels like home – a place to escape the stress and reconnect with the past". The Yancy Street set had previously been used in the MCU film Deadpool & Wolverine (2024) and was repurposed and redecorated for First Steps.

Practical props included a 14-foot (4.3 m) scale model of the Excelsior—the Fantastic Four's spaceship, which is named after one of Lee's most famous catchphrases—to create a miniature effect; H.E.R.B.I.E., realized through a combination of a wooden puppet, a remote-controlled animatronic that had a functioning head and arms, and visual effects; and two models of the team's Fantasticar, one that allowed for interior filming with the actors and another that was "stripped down" for use in effects shots. The filmmakers drew inspiration for the design of the Excelsior from 1960s space technology, particularly that used in the Apollo program missions, and also consulted former NASA astronaut Rick Mastracchio to give the spaceship authentic details such as Velcro tabs to secure equipment and handrails for moving around in zero gravity. The launch platform for the Excelsior juts out from the Baxter Building toward the middle of the East River, with Farahani stating that he and the rest of the creative team "kind of went totally overboard in designing all the functionality of how you could launch a rocket in midtown Manhattan without creating chaos". To achieve this, they devised a rotating system of blast shields, as well as a catchment system that draws water from the river to create massive steam curtains, dampening the flames and protecting the public during liftoff. Farahani said the Fantasticar was based on "mid-'60s American concept cars that were actually referencing European cars". Its accent features, such as its turbine intakes and interface controls, have a 1950s "retrofuture" look.

Location shooting occurred at Durdle Door in Dorset, England, in mid-October 2024 for a scene featuring Johnny that was ultimately cut from the film. Another deleted scene involved a conversation between Johnny and the Silver Surfer at the Baxter Building. Lyonne finished filming her scenes later that month. In mid-November, Sarah Niles was revealed to have been cast. Filming took place from November 19–22 at the Palace of Congresses in Oviedo, Spain, for scenes set in the lobby of the Baxter Building and the assembly hall of the Future Foundation. Filming also took place in the Middleton mine in Derbyshire Dales, England, with a 725-foot (221 m) section of the mine decorated with weathered pipes and other industrial props for scenes set in Mole Man's underground realm of Subterranea. Filming wrapped at the end of November, having lasted 85 days.

=== Post-production ===
In April 2025, Mark Gatiss was revealed to be appearing as Ted Gilbert, the talk show host of The Ted Gilbert Show. He was offered the role without having to audition. A month later, sound designer Matthew Wood was revealed to be the voice of H.E.R.B.I.E. He had previously voiced the Quantumnauts, the foot soldiers of Kang the Conqueror, in Quantumania. Additional photography occurred by then, with Garner seen filming in Los Angeles, California, for a scene depicting Shalla-Bal's origin story, set on her home planet Zenn-La. Shakman said the character's role had evolved throughout the writing process, and he came to feel during post-production that her backstory—in which she chooses to give herself to Galactus to save her planet and family—was reflective of the film's themes and the Fantastic Four's choices. Shakman decided that the backstory should be seen by the audience. The creative team also considered the idea of having Shalla-Bal's characteristic silvery appearance shift to gold—drawing inspiration from the character Frankie Raye / Nova—whenever she used her powers. The film's final screenwriting credits were determined through arbitration with the Writers Guild of America (WGA), with the screenplay attributed to Friedman, Pearson, Kaplan, and Springer from a story by Pearson, Kaplan, Springer, and Kat Wood. Pearson's work on the film included moving Franklin's birth from the beginning of the film to during the team's space escape from Galactus in the middle of the film, along with moving the final fight against Galactus from space to Earth to highlight Galactus's scale. He also worked on Johnny researching and unlocking Shalla-Bal's language, with his drafts having more "flirtatious" moments between the two than what was in the final film.

In July 2025, Shakman revealed that Malkovich's role as Red Ghost had been cut from the film and said this was a "heartbreaking" decision to make. Shakman explained that Red Ghost was originally planned to be introduced in a sequence at the beginning of the film that chronicles the Fantastic Four's early years as superheroes; this sequence would have included a scene of the team battling Red Ghost and his Super-Apes. After this, Red Ghost would have returned in the climax for a scene that initially depicted him destroying Reed's teleportation bridges, although Red Ghost was replaced by Shalla-Bal in that scene for the final cut of the film because Shakman felt "it just made more sense to have [Shalla-Bal] come back. It stayed more on story with the antagonist we knew, and were spending the most time with." Shakman praised Malkovich's performance in the role, but said his scenes were some of many that were cut to help balance the introduction of the Fantastic Four as a group and individually, their world, and the various other villains in the film. Shakman also noted that an extended director's cut of First Steps is "not possible" because many of the cut sequences contain unfinished visual effects. Although Malkovich was removed, the film retains a brief cameo appearance by a cartoon version of Red Ghost in the post-credits scene as part of an in-universe animated series titled The Fantastic Four: Power Hour, which also features cartoon versions of other comic book villains not present in the film such as Diablo, Dragon Man, Mad Thinker, Puppet Master, and Wizard. Additional characters appearing in the film include the Super-Apes orangutan member Peotor and the ginormous Subterranean creature Giganto. Leading up to the film's release, several actors's roles were revealed, including infant actor Ada Scott as Franklin Richards, Hauser as Mole Man, Niles as Lynne Nichols, and Lyonne as Rachel Rozman. The stars of the unreleased The Fantastic Four film–Alex Hyde-White (who portrayed Reed in that film), Rebecca Staab (Sue), Jay Underwood (Johnny), and Michael Bailey Smith (Grimm)–were also revealed to be appearing, making cameo appearances throughout First Steps.

The mid-credits scene of First Steps takes place four years after the film's main events and reintroduces Downey to the MCU as Doctor Doom; the scene was filmed by Doomsday directors Anthony and Joe Russo during the production of that film. As they began work on the story and scripts for Doomsday and Secret Wars, the Russo brothers visited the sets of First Steps and viewed early cuts of scenes with Shakman. He said this allowed him to "pass the baton to them and [ensure that the Fantastic Four characters] would be well cared for". Sets for the Baxter Building from First Steps were reused, with some updates, for Doomsday. First Steps ends with a quote from Jack Kirby: "If you look at my characters, you will find me. No matter what kind of character you create or assume, a little of yourself must remain there." This is followed by the revelation that the numerical designation 828 for the universe in which the film is set was based on his date of birth: August 28, 1917. First Steps is dedicated to two people: producer Jamie Christopher, who previously worked on other MCU films and passed away in 2023 during the pre-production of First Steps due to heart complications; and Shakman's mother Inez, who passed away on April 3, 2025.

Nona Khodai and Tim Roche edited First Steps, having previously worked together on WandaVision and separately on other MCU projects. Visual effects for the film were provided by Industrial Light & Magic (ILM), Framestore, Sony Pictures Imageworks, Digital Domain, Rise FX, and Wētā FX. Scott Stokdyk served as visual effects supervisor, while Lisa Marra was the visual effects producer. There were 2,015 visual effect shots in the final cut of the film, of which Framestore worked on 417 and Digital Domain on 400. ILM worked on the scenes featuring Galactus; Framestore worked on scenes such as the destruction of planet LHS-275 by Galactus's worldship, named Taa II, and the Silver Surfer chase sequence, the latter featuring a neutron star that was based on 2001: A Space Odyssey, as well as the film Interstellar (2014); Imageworks worked on the scenes featuring the Silver Surfer; Digital Domain worked on the scenes featuring H.E.R.B.I.E. and Franklin; and the others collaborated on the remaining scenes in the film. Furthermore, ILM, Framestore, and Digital Domain worked on different scenes featuring the Thing, with Digital Domain also creating nine different life-sized Thing costumes. Much of the New York City shots had buildings built after the 1960s replaced with retro-futuristic buildings. Framestore had a professional surfer perform surfing movements and poses—executed on a board resting on supports—and used photographs taken of her as a reference for the Silver Surfer. The visual effects for the character's metallic skin consisted of two distinct layers: a "brushed metal" base layer to preserve Garner's facial expressions and features; and a "chrome" layer overlaid on the first, providing realistic, brilliant reflections of the environment surrounding the Silver Surfer. The practical Galactus suit that Ineson wore was scanned, with ILM increasing the resolution of the model for close-up shots.

External videos
- Marvel Studios' The Fantastic Four: First Steps End Credits Main-On-End Title Sequence presents the film's main-on-end title sequence, YouTube video from Perception's channel

The film's main-on-end title sequence—which unfolds through image grids, moving squares, and dynamic layouts—was designed by Perception, a long-time Marvel Studios collaborator. Inspired by both mid-century modern aesthetics and the analog charm of 1960s title design, the sequence combines vibrant color fields, hand-drawn animation, and classic grid-based layouts to create an authentically vintage atmosphere. Original in-universe artifacts—such as magazine covers, trading cards, lunchboxes, and a commemorative Galactus plaque—were created specifically for the sequence and combined with materials provided by Marvel, including alternate takes, behind-the-scenes footage, and props from the film. The animation for the Power Hour cartoon was produced by Titmouse, Inc.—the studio that had previously worked on the animated opening title sequence for the second episode of WandaVision, "Don't Touch That Dial" (2021), as well as the stop motion yogurt commercial shown in that series's ninth and final episode, "The Series Finale" (2021).

== Music ==
Michael Giacchino was announced to be composing the score in July 2024, after scoring various MCU projects, and his music for the Fantastic Four and Galactus was previewed during a drone show at SDCC that month. His main Fantastic Four theme was played in full at the D23 convention in August during a "Music of Marvel Studios" panel that Giacchino moderated, and at the Hollywood Bowl later that month as part of Marvel Studios' Infinity Saga Concert Experience. Mike Roe of TheWrap called the theme "a jaunty vibe" that "blends a dreamy sense with future-looking heroic optimism, along with elements that echo the sounds you might expect from a film featuring, say, a space launch". He likened it to the score of Ant-Man. The theme was released as a digital download single from Hollywood Records and Marvel Music on June 5, 2025, and was made available as a 7-inch vinyl along with "Let Us Be Devoured", written and performed by Andrea Datzman, on July 25. Giacchino's full score was released digitally on July 18, 2025.

== Marketing ==
On April 4, 2024—known as "4–4 Day"—Marvel Studios released a teaser poster featuring the Human Torch creating the Fantastic Four symbol with flames in the sky. A link was included that led to a 404 error page featuring H.E.R.B.I.E., with an embedded QR code leading to a Future Foundation–themed page with a list of Fantastic Four comics to read on Marvel Unlimited: Fantastic Four vol. 1 #1 (1961), the team's first appearance; Fantastic Four vol. 1 #48–50 (1966), known as "The Galactus Trilogy" and featuring the first appearances of Galactus and the Silver Surfer; and Fantastic Four: Life Story #1 (2021), which is set in the 1960s. Following a screening of Deadpool & Wolverine at SDCC on July 25, a drone show over Petco Park included images of Galactus and the Fantastic Four logo, teasing announcements at Marvel Studios's Hall H panel two nights later. That panel featured Shakman and the main cast, revealed the full title, showed a teaser reel, and had the film's futuristic Fantasticar float across the stage. Shakman explained that the teaser reel featured pre-filming footage combined with pre-visualizations and animatics that were created during development. The footage was presented in an "old-timey 4:3 aspect ratio". Further footage was shown at D23 Brazil in November.

The first teaser trailer was released on February 4, 2025. Pascal, Kirby, Quinn, and Moss-Bachrach appeared at a fan event at the U.S. Space & Rocket Center in Huntsville, Alabama, which is known as "Rocket City", to launch the teaser. Leading up to this, a short "teaser for the first teaser" was released featuring children running to a television that displays Fantastic Four imagery. Vulture's Jesse David Fox noted a stock sound effect used for the children's laughter, wondering if it was an intentional indication of something or if the footage had just been rushed. Kotaku's Zack Zwiezen likened the widely used sound effect, which had originally been recorded for the film Indiana Jones and the Temple of Doom (1984), to the Wilhelm scream sound effect. He was confused why it was used twice in such a short clip. Discussing the full teaser, Ben Travis at Empire said the film was "on the right track", appreciating the tone, style, and different references to the comics. Several commentators noted that all of the Fantastic Four's powers are seen except for Reed's stretching abilities. A scene of the Thing cooking with H.E.R.B.I.E. was highlighted by commentators who compared it to Moss-Bachrach's role as chef Richie Jerimovich in the series The Bear (2022–2026). Commentators also discussed a scene at the end of the trailer—of the Fantastic Four on a raised stage, surrounded by arrows—that pays homage to the Beatles's first live television performance on The Ed Sullivan Show (1948–1971) in February 1964. The teaser was viewed 202 million times in its first 24 hours, the third-best for a Marvel Studios trailer after those for Deadpool & Wolverine (365M) and 2021's Spider-Man: No Way Home (355M). It became the top trending video on YouTube, and a livestream of the teaser's launch became Marvel's most-viewed ever. Alongside the teaser, Marvel also released several posters featuring the tagline "Prepare 4 Launch". One of these was criticized by some who believed it was created with artificial intelligence (AI), pointing to a woman's face seemingly being used multiple times and hands that appear to have the wrong number of fingers. Marvel denied that AI was used, and other commentators suggested these issues could be the result of poor photoshopping. Both Justin Epps of Screen Rant and Molly Edwards of Total Film believed that a photographer appearing in that poster was the comic book character Phil Sheldon. IMAX screenings for the MCU film Captain America: Brave New World, released later in February, featured a First Steps–themed countdown.

Footage was shown at the 2025 CinemaCon, which gave a first look at Garner's Silver Surfer and revealed that Sue and Reed are expecting a child in the film. Sydney Bucksbaum at Entertainment Weekly said Sue being pregnant gave "new meaning" to the film's title. When the subtitle was originally announced, Jenna Anderson at ComicBook.com theorized "First Steps" could refer to the first steps of a child, indicating the film would see the introduction of either of Reed and Sue's children, Franklin and Valeria Richards; both were not seen in the previous Fantastic Four films. The CinemaCon footage was not released online, despite speculation that a full trailer could be released on April 4, 2025. Instead, a new "retro-styled" poster featuring silhouettes of the Fantastic Four was released on that day alongside an Empire feature that revealed new details about the film. The CinemaCon footage was subsequently released as a trailer on April 17. Michael Cripe at IGN said the trailer had more action than the teaser, including a first look at Reed's stretching abilities. Commentators also noted the focus on Garner's Silver Surfer. A commercial for the Little Caesars pizza chain, directed by Farahani and released in June, features an homage to the first Fantastic Four comic book issue in which the team fights Giganto. Also in June, Feige promoted the film at CineEurope as part of a wider Disney presentation. A new trailer for the film was shown. The 2025 NBA Finals had television spots featuring the Fantastic Four rushing to the Baxter Building to watch the NBA Finals. Fantastic Four-themed games were added to Topgolf locations in conjunction with the film's release. AMC Theaters released a limited-edition popcorn bucket of Galactus to promote the film. The container can hold 9 liters (2.37 gallons) of popcorn and earned a Guinness World Record for the largest popcorn container commercially available.

== Release ==
=== Theatrical ===
The Fantastic Four: First Steps had its world premiere at the Dorothy Chandler Pavilion in Los Angeles on July 21, 2025. The premiere was live-streamed on Disney+—a first for a Disney premiere—featuring interviews with the cast and creatives along with an exclusive sneak peek at the film, with a replay available following the live-stream. The premiere also featured a performance of the film's musical suite, conducted by Giacchino. The film was released in the United States on July 25, in IMAX, ScreenX, and 4DX. It had previously been scheduled for November 8, 2024, February 14, 2025, and May 2, 2025. It is the first film, and start, of Phase Six of the MCU.

=== Home media ===
The Fantastic Four: First Steps was released for digital download on September 23, 2025, and on Ultra HD Blu-ray, Blu-ray, and DVD on October 14. The home media releases include deleted scenes, a gag reel, director's commentary, and featurettes. The film was released on Disney+ on November 5, with an IMAX Enhanced option.

In the United Kingdom, the film debuted at No. 1 on the Official Film Chart for the week ending October 1, ahead of 28 Years Later and Ballerina. First Steps moved to No. 3 on the chart for the week ending October 8, and then ranked No. 7 for the week ending October 15.

In the United States, the film topped Fandango at Home's weekly digital sales and rental chart for the week ending September 28, following its premium digital release on September 23. It reached No. 1 on iTunes as well. The film again ranked No. 1 on Fandango at Home's Top 10 titles for the week ending October 5. It subsequently remained in the service's top 10 up until the week ending November 23. On physical media, the film was the top-selling title on Circana's VideoScan chart for October 2025 and ranked sixth in November. The film ranked tenth on the Top Selling Titles on Disc (DVD and Blu-ray combined) of 2025. It recorded a sales index of 34.95 relative to the year's top-selling title. Blu-ray formats accounted for 71% of total unit sales, including a 37% share from 4K Ultra HD. The film also placed sixth on both the Top Selling Blu-ray Discs of 2025 and the Top Selling 4K Ultra HD Blu-rays of 2025.

Analytics company Samba TV, which gathers viewership data from certain smart TVs and content providers, reported that the film attracted 439,000 U.S. households during its first six days on PVOD. Nielsen Media Research, which records streaming viewership on U.S. television screens, calculated that the film was streamed for 556 million minutes from November 3–9, making it the third most-streamed film that week. In the following week, from November 10–16, the film accumulated 344 million streaming minutes, placing seventh for that period.

== Reception ==
=== Box office ===
The Fantastic Four: First Steps grossed $274.3 million in the United States and Canada, and $247.6 million in other territories, for a worldwide total of $521.9 million.

On July 22, 2025, the film was projected to make $100–110 million at the domestic box office, with an additional $90–100 million overseas for a total of $190–210 million during its opening weekend. The film made $24.4 million in Thursday night previews, the biggest preview box office of 2025, surpassing that of Superman, which had been released two weeks earlier. It collected $57 million on its first day, ranking below A Minecraft Movie as the second-highest opening day for a 2025 film. It ended up debuting to $117.6 million at the domestic box office, below that of Superman, and a total of $216.7 million globally. The film dropped 80% on its second Friday, the second biggest Friday-to-Friday drop for any comic book movie in 2025, behind Captain America: Brave New World, earning $11.7 million.

The Fantastic Four: First Steps retained the top spot at the US/Canadian box office in its second weekend, but it declined by 66% with a gross of $38.7 million. Likewise, it remained at number one for two consecutive weekends in the United Kingdom and Ireland, grossing £3 million ($4.1 million) in its second week and bringing its cumulative total to £15.3 million ($20.4 million) in those markets. During its third weekend, the film fell to third place, grossing $15.8 million behind Freakier Friday and Weapons. The Fantastic Four: First Steps finished its run as the ninth highest-grossing film of 2025 in the U.S. and Canada.

=== Critical response ===
On review aggregator Rotten Tomatoes, 86% of 407 critics gave the film a positive review, with an average rating of 7.2/10. The site's critics consensus reads, "Benefitting from rock-solid cast chemistry and clad in appealingly retro 1960s design, this crack at The Fantastic Four does Marvel's First Family justice." Metacritic summarized the critical response as "generally favorable", based on a weighted average score of 65 out of 100 from 54 critics. Audiences polled by CinemaScore gave the film an average grade of "A−" on an A+ to F scale, while PostTrak reported 93% of audience members gave the film a positive score, with 70% saying they would definitely recommend it.

Variety said the decision to skip the origin story was shrewd. The Guardian's Peter Bradshaw wrote it "hangs together as an entertaining spectacle in its own innocent self-enclosed universe of fantasy wackiness", writing the production design was "hallucinatory" in its 1960s aesthetic, and said it kept the superhero genre "aloft". The Hollywood Reporter's David Rooney similarly praised the 60s vibe, feeling Giacchino's orchestral score, the production design and costuming were complementary. Rooney felt that Moss-Bachrach portrayed "warmth and sensitivity" behind his motion-capture character and wrote of Garner's commanding portrayal of an "icy" to "sorrowful" character arc.

Robbie Collin of The Daily Telegraph said the film "makes you wish that Marvel had reached this point years ago – imagine if 2019's Avengers: Endgame had been followed by this. Yet at least they're here now, and the result is a very unusual sort of franchise instalment: one that feels every inch a one-off." Sandra Hall of The Sydney Morning Herald wrote, "The action is as spectacular as you would expect, which doesn't mean that it's particularly suspenseful, but the film's success lies in the fact it puts the fun back into the franchise."

Esther Zuckerman of Bloomberg News was more critical, writing, "While Superman felt bracingly modern with the political sentiments to boot, The Fantastic Four has a halo of cobwebs it can't quite shake off." Livemint's Udita Jhunjhunwala praised the cast performances, but said the film was "competent at best—a reboot with cosmic ambition that barely attains lift-off." The Australian's Stephen Romei praised the opening sequence but criticized the film's dialogue, concluding, "The superhero movie franchise has its ups and downs. This one is definitely on the downside."

=== Accolades ===
Accolades received by The Fantastic Four: First Steps
Award	Date of ceremony	Category	Recipient	Result	Ref.
ADG Excellence in Production Design Awards	February 28, 2026	Excellence in Production Design for a Fantasy Film	Kasra Farahani	Won	
Astra Film Awards	January 9, 2026	Best Action or Science Fiction Feature	The Fantastic Four: First Steps	Nominated	
Astra Midseason Movie Awards	July 3, 2025	Most Anticipated Film	The Fantastic Four: First Steps	Nominated	
Critics' Choice Movie Awards	January 4, 2026	Best Production Design	Kasra Farahani and Jille Azis	Nominated	
Critics' Choice Super Awards	August 6, 2026	Best Superhero Movie	The Fantastic Four: First Steps	Nominated	
Critics' Choice Super Awards	August 6, 2026	Best Actor in a Superhero Movie	Pedro Pascal	Nominated	
Critics' Choice Super Awards	August 6, 2026	Best Actress in a Superhero Movie	Julia Garner	Nominated	
Critics' Choice Super Awards	August 6, 2026	Best Actress in a Superhero Movie	Vanessa Kirby	Nominated	
Hollywood Music in Media Awards	November 19, 2025	Original Score – Sci-Fi/Fantasy Film	Michael Giacchino	Nominated	
Movieguide Awards	February 6, 2026	Faith and Freedom Award for Movies	The Fantastic Four: First Steps	Nominated	
Movieguide Awards	February 6, 2026	Best Movie for Mature Audiences	The Fantastic Four: First Steps	Nominated	
Movieguide Awards	February 6, 2026	Grace Award for Most Inspiring Performance for Movies, Actress	Vanessa Kirby	Nominated	
Nickelodeon Kids' Choice Awards	November 14, 2026	Favorite Villain	Julia Garner	Nominated	
Saturn Awards	March 8, 2026	Best Cinematic Adaptation Film	The Fantastic Four: First Steps	Won	
Saturn Awards	March 8, 2026	Best Film Direction	Matt Shakman	Nominated	
Saturn Awards	March 8, 2026	Best Film Screenwriting	Josh Friedman, Jeff Kaplan, Eric Pearson, and Ian Springer	Nominated	
Saturn Awards	March 8, 2026	Best Actor in a Film	Pedro Pascal	Nominated	
Saturn Awards	March 8, 2026	Best Actress in a Film	Vanessa Kirby	Nominated	
Saturn Awards	March 8, 2026	Best Supporting Actor in a Film	Ebon Moss-Bachrach	Nominated	
Saturn Awards	March 8, 2026	Best Film Editing	Nona Khodai and Tim Roche	Nominated	
Saturn Awards	March 8, 2026	Best Film Music	Michael Giacchino	Nominated	
Saturn Awards	March 8, 2026	Best Film Production Design	Jille Azis and Kasra Farahani	Won	
Saturn Awards	March 8, 2026	Best Film Costume Design	Alexandra Byrne	Nominated	
Saturn Awards	March 8, 2026	Best Film Visual / Special Effects	Daniele Bigi, Lisa Marra, and Scott Stokdyk	Nominated	
Saturn Awards	March 8, 2026	Best 4K Home Media Release	The Fantastic Four: First Steps	Nominated	
Set Decorators Society of America Awards	February 21, 2026	Best Achievement in Décor/Design of a Fantasy or Science Fiction Film	Jille Azis (Set Decoration) and Kasra Farahani (Production Design)	Nominated	

== Other media ==
At the end of April 2025, Marvel Comics and Marvel Studios announced a tie-in one-shot comic titled Fantastic Four: First Steps, which was released on July 9. It was written by Matt Fraction and drawn by Mark Buckingham, with colors, lettering, and cover art provided by Alex Sinclair, Joe Caramagna, and Phil Noto, respectively. Marvel Comics worked with the film's creative team to ensure the comic matched the film's style and tone, and the comics team visited the set during filming. It is presented as an in-universe comic published by the Future Foundation on the fourth anniversary of the Fantastic Four gaining their powers, serving as an "authorized retelling" of the team's early adventures.

In December 2025, Marvel Comics announced four additional tie-in one-shot comics that, similar to the First Steps one-shot, are presented as in-universe comics published by the Future Foundation and expand on characters and moments from the film; the four comics are expected to be released quarterly throughout 2026. Buckingham, Sinclair, Caramanga, and Noto returned as artist, colorist, letterer, and cover artist, respectively, for the additional one-shots. The first one-shot, titled Fantastic Four: First Foes, was released on March 25. It was written by Dan Slott, and explores an early adventure of the Fantastic Four facing off against René Rodin / Mad Thinker. A two-page short story written by Ryan North, "Fantastic Science", is also included, which is inspired by Reed's educational television programming as seen in the film. The second one-shot, Fantastic Four: First Foes – Shalla-Bal, was released on July 8, and written by Charles Soule. It focuses on how Shalla-Bal became Galactus's herald, the Silver Surfer, before the events of the film. A "Fantastic Science" short story written by North is also included. The third one-shot comic, titled Fantastic Four: First Foes – Dragon Man, was released on September 30, and written by Greg Pak. It sees Grimm struggling with his rocky form as a potential cure for his condition emerges and involves the android Dragon Man. The fourth and final one-shot comic, titled Fantastic Four: First Foes – The Wizard, is scheduled for release on January 13, 2027, and written by Fabian Nicieza. It was originally planned for release on December 9, 2026. The comic sees the Fantastic Four facing off against the Wizard and his newly assembled team, the Frightful Four, as they plan to steal the Baxter Building itself.

== Future ==
A sequel to First Steps was reported to be in development in June 2025. In August, Sneider reported that Shakman was expected to return to direct the sequel, which Marvel Studios believed would perform better financially than First Steps once the Fantastic Four had been seen in Doomsday and Secret Wars. However, Shakman was revealed in May 2026 to be directing a new Planet of the Apes film and Sneider believed that he was no longer attached to the First Steps sequel as a result.
