= Doctor Doom in other media =

Appearances of Doctor Doom in cinema, television and video games

Adaptations of Doctor Doom in other media
- The "Legendary Scale Figure" of Doctor Doom by Sideshow Collectibles
- Original source: Comics published by Marvel Comics
- First appearance: Fantastic Four #5 (cover-dated July 1962; published April 10, 1962)

Films and television
- Film(s): The Fantastic Four (1994); Fantastic Four (2005); Fantastic Four: Rise of the Silver Surfer (2007); Fantastic Four (2015); The Fantastic Four: First Steps (2025); Avengers Endgame: Encore (2026); Avengers: Doomsday (2026); Avengers: Secret Wars (2027)
- Television show(s): Fantastic Four (1967); The New Fantastic Four (1978); Fantastic Four (1994); Fantastic Four: World's Greatest Heroes (2006); VisionQuest (2026)

Doctor Doom, a supervillain in Marvel Comics and the archenemy of the superhero team the Fantastic Four, has appeared in various forms of media and been featured in almost every adaptation of the Fantastic Four franchise, including films, television series, and video games.

The character has been featured in all five live-action Fantastic Four films, having been portrayed by Joseph Culp in the unreleased 1994 film, Julian McMahon in the 2005 film and its 2007 sequel, Toby Kebbell in the 2015 film, and Robert Downey Jr. in the 2025 Marvel Cinematic Universe (MCU) film The Fantastic Four: First Steps. Downey reprised the role in Avengers Endgame: Encore (2026), the Disney+ miniseries VisionQuest (2026), and will return in the upcoming films Avengers: Doomsday (2026) and Avengers: Secret Wars (2027). Simon Templeman, Paul Dobson, Clive Revill, and Lex Lang, among others, have provided Doom's voice in animation and video games.

== Television ==
Doctor Doom as he appears in Fantastic Four: World's Greatest Heroes

- Doctor Doom appears in The Marvel Super Heroes (1966), voiced by Henry Ramer.
- Doctor Doom appears in Fantastic Four (1967), voiced by Joseph Sirola.
- Doctor Doom appears in The New Fantastic Four, voiced by John Stephenson.
- Doctor Doom appears in Spider-Man (1981), voiced by Ralph James.
- Doctor Doom appears in Spider-Man and His Amazing Friends, voiced by Shepard Menken.
- Doctor Doom appears in Fantastic Four (1994), voiced by Neil Ross in the first season and Simon Templeman in the second season.
- Doctor Doom appears in The Incredible Hulk, voiced again by Simon Templeman.
- Doctor Doom appears in Spider-Man: The Animated Series, voiced by Tom Kane.
- Doctor Doom appears in Fantastic Four: World's Greatest Heroes, voiced by Paul Dobson. Synergetic with the 2005 live-action film, this version was the sponsor of the space mission that created the Fantastic Four and is based in the Latverian Embassy of New York City.
- Doctor Doom appears in The Super Hero Squad Show, voiced by Charlie Adler. This version is the leader of the Lethal Legion.
- Doctor Doom appears in Iron Man: Armored Adventures, voiced by Christopher Britton.
- Doctor Doom appears in The Avengers: Earth's Mightiest Heroes, voiced by Lex Lang.
- Doctor Doom appears in Ultimate Spider-Man, voiced by Maurice LaMarche.
- Doctor Doom appears in Avengers Assemble, voiced again by Maurice LaMarche.
- Doctor Doom appears in Hulk and the Agents of S.M.A.S.H., voiced again by Maurice LaMarche.
- Doctor Doom appears in X-Men '97, voiced by Ross Marquand.

== Film ==
Julian McMahon as Victor von Doom in Fantastic Four (2005)

Toby Kebbell as Victor von Doom in Fantastic Four (2015)

- Victor von Doom / Doctor Doom appears in The Fantastic Four (1994), portrayed by Joseph Culp. This version is Reed Richards' former college friend who was nearly killed in an accident when they tried to capture the power of the Colossus comet.
- Victor von Doom / Doctor Doom appears in Fantastic Four (2005), portrayed by Julian McMahon. This version is the billionaire CEO of Von Doom Industries who sponsors and joins the Fantastic Four's space expedition, during which he is exposed to cosmic rays and gains electricity-manipulation powers while his body begins turning into organic metal.
- Victor von Doom / Doctor Doom appears in Fantastic Four: Rise of the Silver Surfer (2007), portrayed again by Julian McMahon.
- Doctor Doom appears in Marvel Super Heroes 4D, voiced again by Paul Dobson.
- Victor von Doom appears in Fantastic Four (2015), portrayed by Toby Kebbell. This version is an anti-social computer programmer at the Baxter Foundation who accompanies the Fantastic Four to Planet Zero, where he is mutated by a green liquid and gains telekinesis.
- Victor von Doom / Doctor Doom appears in the Marvel Cinematic Universe (MCU), portrayed by Robert Downey Jr. He makes cameo appearances in the mid-credits scenes of The Fantastic Four: First Steps (2025), Avengers Endgame: Encore (2026), and the Disney+ miniseries VisionQuest (2026). He is set to return in the upcoming films Avengers: Doomsday (2026) and Avengers: Secret Wars (2027).

== Video games ==
Doctor Doom (left) in Marvel Super Heroes

- Doctor Doom appears as the final boss of The Amazing Spider-Man and Captain America in Dr. Doom's Revenge! (1989).
- Doctor Doom appears in Spider-Man: The Video Game (1991).
- Doctor Doom appears as a boss and playable character in Marvel Super Heroes (1995), voiced by Lorne Kennedy.
- Doctor Doom appears as a boss in Marvel Super Heroes in War of the Gems (1996).
- Doctor Doom appears as a boss in Fantastic Four (1997).
- Doctor Doom appears as a playable character in Marvel vs. Capcom 2: New Age of Heroes (2000), voiced again by Lorne Kennedy.
- Doctor Doom appears in Fantastic Four (2005), voiced by Julian McMahon. Additionally, his comics design appears in bonus levels, voiced by Jim Meskimen.
- Doctor Doom appears as a playable character in the PlayStation Portable version of Marvel Nemesis: Rise of the Imperfects (2005).
- Doctor Doom appears as the final boss of Marvel: Ultimate Alliance (2006), voiced by Clive Revill. This version is the leader of the Masters of Evil.
- Doctor Doom, based on Julian McMahon's portrayal, appears in Fantastic Four: Rise of the Silver Surfer (2007), voiced by Gideon Emery.
- Doctor Doom appears as a playable character in Marvel vs. Capcom 3: Fate of Two Worlds and Ultimate Marvel vs. Capcom 3 (2011), voiced again by Paul Dobson.
- Doctor Doom appears in Marvel Super Hero Squad (2009), voiced by Charlie Adler. This version is the leader of the Lethal Legion.
- Doctor Doom appears in Pinball FX 2 (2010).
- Doctor Doom appears in Marvel Super Hero Squad: The Infinity Gauntlet, voiced again by Charlie Adler.
- Doctor Doom appears as an unlockable playable character in Marvel Super Hero Squad Online, voiced again by Charlie Adler.
- Doctor Doom appears in Marvel Super Hero Squad: Comic Combat, voiced again by Charlie Adler.
- Doctor Doom appears as a boss and unlockable playable character in Marvel Avengers Alliance.
- Doctor Doom appears as a playable character in Marvel Avengers: Battle for Earth, voiced by Fred Tatasciore.
- Doctor Doom appears in LittleBigPlanet via the "Marvel Costume Kit 6" DLC.
- Doctor Doom appears as a boss and unlockable playable character in Marvel Heroes, voiced again by Lex Lang.
- Doctor Doom appears as a playable character and boss in Lego Marvel Super Heroes, voiced again by Fred Tatasciore. This version is a leading member of the Lethal Legion.
- Doctor Doom appears as an unlockable character in Avengers Alliance Tactics.
- Doctor Doom appears as a playable character in Marvel: Future Fight.
- Doctor Doom appears as a playable character in Marvel Contest of Champions.
- Doctor Doom appears as unlockable cosmetic outfits in Fortnite Battle Royale.
- Doctor Doom appears in Marvel Ultimate Alliance 3: The Black Order, voiced again by Maurice LaMarche.
- Doctor Doom appears in Marvel Snap.
- Doctor Doom appears in Marvel's Midnight Suns, voiced by Graham McTavish.
- Doom and his 2099 counterpart appear as NPCs in Marvel Rivals, both voiced by Travis Willingham.
- Doctor Doom appears as a playable character in Marvel Tōkon: Fighting Souls, voiced by SungWon Cho in English, with Takaya Hashi posthumously voicing the character in Japanese. This version leads a team called the Knights of Doom (a namesake team originally debuted in a 2000-2001's four issued alternate universe comic book series Fantastic Four: Big Town), consisting of other villains such as Magneto, Green Goblin, and Carnage.

== Miscellaneous ==
- Doctor Doom appears in the 1987 live adaptation of Spider-Man and Mary Jane Watson's wedding.
- Doctor Doom appears in the novel trilogy X-Men: The Chaos Engine.
- Doctor Doom appears in the comic book prequel for Marvel vs. Capcom 3: Fate of Two Worlds as a member of the Cabal.
- Doctor Doom, based on the Old Man Logan incarnation, appears in Marvel's Wastelanders, voiced by Dylan Baker.
- Doctor Doom appears in the tie-in comic Fortnite x Marvel: Zero War.
- Doctor Doom appears in the BBC radio adaptation of the Spider-Man comics, portrayed by Michael Roberts.
- Doctor Doom appears in the Robot Chicken episode "Monstourage", voiced by Julian McMahon.
- Doctor Doom is depicted on three cards in Magic: The Gathering as part of a crossover with Marvel Comics.
