= Doctor Doom =

Supervillain appearing in Marvel Comics

- Interior art of Doctor Doom #1 (October 2019). Art by Salvador Larroca and Guru-eFX.

Publication information
- Publisher: Marvel Comics
- First appearance: The Fantastic Four #5 (cover-dated July 1962; published April 10, 1962)
- Created by: Stan Lee (writer-editor); Jack Kirby (artist/co-plotter)

In-story information
- Full name: Victor von Doom
- Place of origin: Latveria
- Team affiliations: Acts of Vengeance; Cabal; Intelligencia; Future Foundation; Astonishing Avengers; Doom's Avengers; Guardians of the Galaxy
- Abilities: Genius-level intellect; Proficient scientist, engineer, and sorcerer; Skilled hand-to-hand combatant; Powered armor grants: Superhuman strength and durability; Flight; High-tech weapons and equipment

Doctor Doom is a supervillain appearing in American comic books published by Marvel Comics. Created by writer-editor Stan Lee and artist Jack Kirby, the character first appeared in The Fantastic Four #5 (cover dated July 1962), with his full origin story following two years later in Fantastic Four Annual #2 (1964). Shortly after his creation, Doom became the archenemy of the Fantastic Four and one of Marvel's most widely used villains, appearing across titles including The Avengers, The Amazing Spider-Man, Iron Man, and Daredevil within his first decade.

Doctor Doom is the moniker of Victor Werner von Doom, the monarch of the fictional European country Latveria. Born to a Latverian healer and a Romani witch, Doom is a master of both science and sorcery, and seeks to bring order to humanity through world domination and prove his intellectual superiority over Mister Fantastic—his old college rival and the leader of the Fantastic Four—whom he blames for his disfigurement in a laboratory accident. Doom wears a metal mask to conceal his scarred face and a magically forged suit of armor that grants him superhuman strength, flight, and high-tech weaponry. His proficiency in dark magic and the mystic arts imbues him with abilities ranging from energy projection to spell casting, while his diplomatic immunity as head of state shields him from prosecution for crimes committed outside Latveria. The character was conceived by Kirby as a figure of approaching death (entirely encased in metal and stripped of human mercy) and by Lee as a study in arrogance as its own undoing. Early Doom stories functioned as Cold War allegories, with scholars comparing his rule of Latveria to leaders such as Josip Broz Tito, while later stories have used him to comment on the War on terror and described him as a stand-in for Saddam Hussein.

Major Doctor Doom stories include the "Unthinkable" arc in Fantastic Four (2003–2004), in which he imprisons Mister Fantastic in a magical dimension, and Books of Doom (2005–2006), a retelling of his origin written by Ed Brubaker. Doom is a central figure in the company-wide Secret Wars (2015) event, in which he claims godhood over a reconstructed multiverse before Mister Fantastic defeats and temporarily redeems him, causing him to briefly adopt the Iron Man persona in the Infamous Iron Man series (2016–2018), before returning to villainy and headlining the "One World Under Doom" (2025) crossover event. While his primary obsession is the Fantastic Four, Doom has also fought other heroes, including Spider-Man, Iron Man, Doctor Strange, Black Panther, the X-Men, and the Avengers.

The character has been listed as one of Marvel's most notable iconic villains and among the greatest comic book villains ever created. He has been listed as among the most visible Romani characters in mainstream superhero comics. Doom's popularity has been featured on merchandise such as clothing and collectible items, and been adapted in various media incarnations, including films, television series, and video games. Most notably, Julian McMahon, Toby Kebbell, and Robert Downey Jr. have portrayed the character in live-action.

== Publication history ==
=== Creation ===
Like many of Marvel's Silver Age characters, Doctor Doom was conceived by Stan Lee and Jack Kirby. With the Fantastic Four title performing well, Lee and Kirby were trying to dream up a "soul-stirring...super sensational new villain" for the series. Looking for a name, Lee latched onto "Doctor Doom" as "eloquent in its simplicity — magnificent in its implied menace".

Kirby stated in a 1987 interview: "Dr. Doom was the classic conception of Death, of approaching Death. I saw Dr. Doom as The Man in the Iron Mask, who symbolized approaching Death. It was the reason for the armor and the hood. Death is connected with armor and inhuman-like steel. Death is something without mercy and human flesh contains that element of mercy. Therefore, I had to erase it, and I did it with a mask." Kirby drew his interpretation of what Doom would look like under the mask, giving Doom only "a tiny scar on his cheek". Due to this slight imperfection, Doom hides his face not from the world, but from himself. To Kirby, this is the motivation for Doom's vengeance against the world; because others are superior due to this slight scar, Doom wants to elevate himself above them.

Kirby further described Doom as being "paranoid", wrecked by his twisted face and wanting the whole world to be like him. Kirby went on to say that "Doom is an evil person, but he's not always been evil. He was [respected]...but through a flaw in his own character, he was a perfectionist." Stan Lee's writing typically showed Doom's arrogance as his constant downfall, and how his pride leads to von Doom's disfigurement at the hands of his own machine, and to the failures of many of his schemes.

In the book Superhero: The Secret Origin of a Genre, Peter Coogan writes that Doom's original appearance was representative of a change in the portrayal of "mad scientists" to full-fledged villains, often with upgraded powers. These supervillains are genre-crossing villains who exist in adventures "in a world in which the ordinary laws of nature are slightly suspended"; characters such as Professor Moriarty, Count Dracula, Auric Goldfinger, Hannibal Lecter, Joker, Lex Luthor, and Darth Vader, also fit this description. Comic book critic Peter Sanderson also found traces of William Shakespeare's characters Richard III and Iago in Doom; all of them "are descended from the 'vice' figure of medieval drama", who address the audience in monologues detailing their thoughts and ambitions.

=== Early years ===
Doctor Doom's debut in The Fantastic Four #5 (April 1962). Art by Jack Kirby.

The character first appeared in The Fantastic Four #5 (cover dated July 1962), roughly midway between the Checkpoint Charlie standoff of October 1961 and the Cuban Missile Crisis the following October. It marked the point where the creators shifted from the monster genre to the superhero genre, and it was their first attempt at creating a lasting supervillain. In the issue, Doom is introduced as a peer of Mister Fantastic's who has been facially scarred by a scientific experiment, learned magic in Tibet, and established control of his home country, Latveria; the character re-appears in the following issue, briefly allying with Namor. Doom appears again in issue #10 (January 1963); Ben Saunders says that this is the best early Doom story, establishing the character as Mister Fantastic's "Jungian shadow or distorted double." He also appeared in The Amazing Spider-Man #5 (October 1963). Due to the rush to publish, the character was not given a full origin story until Fantastic Four Annual #2, two years after his debut. The story establishes that Doom was born to a Romani family in Latveria, a small kingdom in the Alps, experienced persecution, but eventually became its undisputed leader. Saunders describes the story as transforming the character "from a malignant sci-fi warlock into a more complex figure: although narcissistically wounded and vengeful, he displays a sense of responsibility for his people, and a warped code of honor." In Fantastic Four #57–60 (December 1966 – March 1967) Doom steals the power of the Silver Surfer.

While the Fantastic Four had fought various villains such as the Mole Man, Skrulls, the Miracle Man, and Namor the Sub-Mariner, Doom managed to overshadow them all and became the Fantastic Four's archnemesis.

=== 1969–1978 ===
By the time Doom returned for a four-part story in Fantastic Four #84–87 (March-June 1969), Kirby's interest in the title was visibly declining. The arc, in which the team is lured to Latveria to investigate rumors of a new robot army and finds itself trapped in a village where every need is met but no one may leave, was inspired by the British television series The Prisoner. It would turn out to be Kirby's last substantial work on the character before his departure from Marvel the following year. In the story, during a formal dinner staged to unsettle Sue Richards and Crystal, Doom murders a servant who threatens to damage his art collection. Pierre Comtois credits the arc with cementing Doom as "one of the most fully rounded, complex, and realistically motivated villains in the Marvel Universe." He notes that the story's climax hinges on the tension between Doom's hatred for the Fantastic Four and the responsibilities he inadvertently assumed when he seized control of Latveria.

In August 1970, Doom received his own solo feature in the split-book series Astonishing Tales with Ka-Zar. The series was written by Roy Thomas and illustrated by Wally Wood. The series leaned into Doom attempting to maintain control over Latveria rather than superhero combat. One of its early storylines pitted Doom against Prince Rudolfo, a rival claimant to the throne. Doom crushes the rebellion by pulling his own castle down on the rebels, warning the survivors that "none may defy me with impunity". Mark Hibbett has compared the sequence to the Soviet Union's invasion of Czechoslovakia. Red Skull became a recurring foil for Doom around the same time. In Astonishing Tales #4 (Feb. 1971), Skull and his Nazi exiles seize Latveria while Doom is vacationing in Monte Carlo, and Doom retakes his own kingdom with a shrinking ray.

Gerry Conway and Gene Colan took over as writer and artist beginning with issue #7, and inker Tom Palmer joined for #8. The resulting story, "Though Some Call It Magic!," showed his mother's soul, damned to Hell as a witch who "died unconfessed," and an annual ritual in which Doom personally battles the Devil to win her freedom. Doom loses again, and tells his servant Boris afterward, "Doom needs no one. Doom wants no one." It would be the character's last solo outing in the title; weak sales led editor Stan Lee to cancel the split format entirely with issue #12 in June 1972, leaving Ka-Zar as Astonishing Tales' sole feature.

Doom's alliance with Namor the Sub-Mariner, first attempted and immediately betrayed in Fantastic Four #6 back in 1962, was rebuilt gradually over the decade. Doom proposed a fuller partnership in Giant-Size Super-Villain Team-Up #1 in March 1975. The alliance collapsed again once Namor realized Doom was using him, but the two kept coming back to each other through Super-Villain Team-Up #2–5 (1975–76). Doom intervenes to save Namor from the villains Attuma and Tiger Shark, and the two fall out and reconcile again before the run is through. Doom rescued Namor from amnesia and recruited him against the terrorist organization A.I.M. in Sub-Mariner #47–48 (1972).

In Super-Villain Team-Up #10–12 (1977), Red Skull stages a coup while promising Latverians the democracy Doom denies them. Captain America, suspecting an alliance between the two dictators, storms the country to intervene. Doom turns out to know nothing of the coup, and when he spots Boris in chains among the Skull's prisoners, his fury at the sight surprises Captain America, who had not expected Doom "to actually care for his own people". Once the Skull is defeated, Captain America makes a choice to leave Doom on the throne rather than support Latveria's rebels, reasoning that Doom "wants the best for his people".

In this decade, Doom branched out to more Marvel titles, such as The Incredible Hulk #143 (September 1971), Super-Villain Team-Up #1-15 (August 1975 - November 1978), Marvel Team-Up #42 (February 1976), and Master of Kung Fu #59-60 (December 1977-January 1978).

=== 1980s and 1990s ===
In What If? #22 (August 1980), written by Don Glut and illustrated by Fred Kida, Victor von Doom listens to Reed Richards' warning regarding the calculation error in his machine. In this alternate timeline, Doom avoids disfigurement, rescues his mother's soul from Hell, becomes ruler of Latveria, and marries Valeria. When the demon Mephisto later holds Latveria hostage and demands a single sacrifice, Doom chooses to sacrifice Valeria rather than himself.

Doctor Doom appeared as the main antagonist in the second Marvel/DC crossover, Superman and Spider-Man, in 1981. Marvel editor-in-chief Jim Shooter co-wrote the story with Marv Wolfman, and recalled choosing Victor von Doom based on his iconic status: "I figured I needed the heaviest-duty bad guy we had to offer — Doctor Doom. Their greatest hero against our greatest villain."

In August 1981, he appeared in Iron Man, where Stark thwarted Doom's time-travelling plan to enlist Morgan le Fay to defeat King Arthur's forces with an army of revived warriors. Stranded in the past due to this interference, Doom vowed revenge, but he had to postpone it to return to the present day.

With issue #232 (March 1981) John Byrne began his six-year run writing and illustrating Fantastic Four, sparking a "second golden age" for the title but also attempting to "turn the clock back [...] get back and see fresh what it was that made the book great at its inception." Doctor Doom made his first appearance under Byrne's tenure with issue #236 (November 1981). Whereas Kirby had intimated that Doom's disfigurement was more a figment of Victor's vain personality, Byrne decided that Doom's face was truly ravaged: only Doom's own robot slaves are allowed to see the monarch without his helmet. Byrne emphasized other aspects of Doom's personality; despite his ruthless nature, Victor von Doom is a man of honor.

Doctor Doom confronted the X-Men in Uncanny X-Men #145 (May 1981), in which he attempts to capture and seduce Storm. The conflict was something of a misunderstanding, and Storm and Doom established a relatively positive understanding; as a result, Storm sought out Doom's help in Fantastic Four vs. the X-Men #2 (March 1987).

Returning to Latveria after being temporarily deposed, Doctor Doom abandons a scheme to wrest mystical secrets from Doctor Strange to oversee his land's reconstruction. Despite a tempestuous temper, Doom occasionally shows warmth and empathy to others; he tries to free his mother from Mephisto and treats Kristoff Vernard like his own son. Byrne gave further detail regarding Doom's scarring: Byrne introduced the idea that the accident at Empire State University only left Victor with a small scar that was exaggerated into a more disfiguring accident by Doom's own arrogance—by donning his newly forged face mask before it had fully cooled, he caused massive irreparable damage. During Steve Englehart's run on Fantastic Four (1987–1989), Doom was exiled by his heir, Kristoff, but this storyline was left unresolved when Englehart departed.

Walt Simonson's Fantastic Four #350 (March 1991) controversially revealed that the Doom seen during Englehart's arc was a robotic imposter, with the real Doom returning in new armor to reclaim Latveria. Simonson's retcon suggested the last true appearance of Doom was in the "Battle of the Baxter Building", but later writers often disregarded his interpretations, leading to further revisions of Doom's character and history.

In January 1993, writer John Francis Moore and artist Pat Broderick released the first issue of Doom 2099. The series saw Doom being transported to the year 2099, and it was kept ambiguous whether or not this was a new version of Doom.

=== 2000s ===
Mark Waid began to redefine Doctor Doom in the 2003 "Unthinkable" storyline (Fantastic Four vol. 3, #66-70 and #500), where Doom forsakes technology for mysticism. He kills his first love, Valeria, to gain powers from demons and imprisons Franklin Richards in Hell. Doom challenges Reed Richards to escape a magical prison, but with Doctor Strange's help, Richards succeeds, causing Doom to be dragged to Hell. Doom remained there until the 2004 "Ragnarok" storyline in Thor, where Thor's hammer, Mjölnir, provided his escape. In 2005–2006, Doctor Doom starred in the limited series Books of Doom, written by Ed Brubaker. This retelling of his origin explored the early, less-seen parts of Doom's life and questioned whether his path to dictatorship was fated or due to personal faults—a nature versus nurture debate. Brubaker's portrayal was influenced by the original Lee/Kirby version, and he chose not to show Doom's face, following Kirby's example.

In Spider-Man/Fantastic Four #4, the Mighty Avengers invaded Latveria due to Victor's involvement in a chemical bomb plot involving the Venom symbiote, which was actually orchestrated by Kristoff Vernard. In the Siege storyline, Doctor Doom initially supports Norman Osborn's attack on Asgard but later withdraws.

=== 2010s ===
Doom stars in Doomwar (February-October 2010) written by Jonathan Maberry, where he allies with the isolationist Desturi to seize control of Wakanda; he battles both Black Panther and Shuri.

In FF #1 (2011), Jonathan Hickman and Steve Epting had Valeria Richards invite Doom to join the Future Foundation, offering to restore part of his damaged mind in exchange for his help. Doom went on to assist the group against the Council of Reeds and the Mad Celestials before leaving once he judged his debt to the Richards family repaid. The miniseries Avengers: The Children's Crusade (2010–2012), by Allan Heinberg and Jim Cheung, found the Young Avengers members Speed and Wiccan tracking Scarlet Witch to Latveria, where Doom was revealed to be planning to marry her.

In 2014, the Avengers and X-Men: AXIS crossover briefly inverted Doom's personality. Writers Nick Spencer and Frank Barbiere, with artist Marco Checchetto, had the altered Doom assemble his own team of heroes in Avengers World #15–16, absorbing some of Scarlet Witch's power, resurrecting Cassie Lang and Doctor Voodoo, and ultimately helping reverse the inversion spell that had changed him in the first place. Al Ewing's Loki: Agent of Asgard #6 featured Doom interacting with Loki.

In the 2015 crossover Secret Wars, written by Hickman with art by Esad Ribić, Doom and Doctor Strange construct a planet called Battleworld from the wreckage of the destroyed multiverse, which Doom rules as a self-declared god. Hickman said he and Ribić depicted Doom's facial scarring as severely as possible to show that "there's still something fundamentally flawed within him that manifests itself externally". Throughout the Battleworld tie-in miniseries, dialogue that would ordinarily use the word "God" instead used "Doom". The story ends with the primary Marvel Universe restored and Doom's rule of Battleworld undone.

Secret Wars was accompanied by other Battleworld-set material the same year. In Ultimate End (2015), by Brian Michael Bendis, Mark Bagley, and Mark Farmer, Doom is revealed to have preserved a fragment of the separately destroyed Ultimate Universe as one of Battleworld's zones, leading to conflict between its survivors and their mainline-universe counterparts that is ultimately resolved by Nick Fury and Miles Morales.

Invincible Iron Man #2 (2015), by Bendis and David Marquez, depicted a healed, unmasked, and unarmored Doom helping Tony Stark against Madame Masque.

Doctor Doom was featured in his first solo series in 2019. Doom is framed for a Moon space station explosion he had warned about, while also experiencing random encounters with rival supervillain Kang the Conqueror due to a theorized quantum entanglement.

=== 2020s ===
In January 2025, J. Michael Straczynski and Will Robson published the one-shot Doctor Doom & Rocket Raccoon, in which Doom enlists Rocket Raccoon's help building a device to travel to a point before the Big Bang.

After Doom acquired the title of Sorcerer Supreme from Doctor Strange in Blood Hunt (2024), writer Ryan North and artist R.B. Silva launched One World Under Doom (2025), a nine-issue crossover in which Doom governed the entire planet. Across multiple interviews, North identified the political question at the series' center: Doom's world takeover dramatizes "the dangerous anti-democratic fantasy" of one perfect leader who can fix everything, a fantasy he identified as the structural appeal of fascism. North characterized Doom specifically as "the kind of guy who's like, 'Yes, OK, yes, that is fascism. But when I'm doing it, it's not fascism, it's the actual best guy doing it, so it's fine.'"

The eighth issue saw Doom accidentally kill his goddaughter Valeria Richards. Contemporary analysis stated the love for his goddaughter is the one human attachment that could undo him. North had emphasized the Doom/Valeria relationship as central to the series from its announcement, describing Doom approaching Valeria in the second issue to justify his actions: "He basically goes to Valeria and says, 'Look, you are my goddaughter and, unlike most people on Earth, I really care about what you think, so let me justify what I'm doing to you.'"

Following Doom's death in One World Under Doom, Marvel published Will of Doom and, in 2026, Dungeons of Doom, by Benjamin Percy and Phillip Kennedy Johnson, in which several factions explore vaults Doom left behind in Latveria. In March 2026, Marvel released 21 variant covers across its line reinterpreting classic Doom cover images. That June, Chip Zdarsky and Valerio Schiti's Captain America #12 saw Doom return as a spirit, drawing Steve Rogers into a story that leads into the 2026 crossover Avengers: Armageddon, after Red Hulk begins a campaign against Latveria.

Marvel also began Challenges of Doom in July 2026, a five-issue series written by Al Ewing with rotating artists, each issue focused on a confrontation between Doom and a different rival: Mister Fantastic, Spider-Man, Doctor Strange, Magneto, and Namor. In June 2026, Marvel dedicated its “616 Day” promotion to Doom, including the debut of a new ongoing series, Doomquest, by Ryan North and Francesco Mobili. In December 2026, Dark Horse Books will publish Marvel's Most Villainous Volume 2: Doctor Doom, a 376-page hardcover collection of Doom stories and art with commentary by comics historians Chris Ryall and John Lind.

== Characterization ==
=== Fictional character biography ===
Victor von Doom was born in Latveria to a tribe of Romani people. His mother, the witch Cynthia Von Doom, was killed when he was a baby. His father, Werner von Doom, a renowned medicine man, was unable to save a baron's wife from cancer. He fled with young Victor, and ultimately died of cold exposure. Victor discovered his mother's occult instruments and swore revenge on the Baron. He became a brilliant inventor, earning a scholarship from Empire State University, where he met Reed Richards, his future rival.

He built a machine to enter hell and rescue his mother, but he miscalculates in his engineering; the machine explodes, scarring his face. He travelled to Tibet and worked together with monks to forge an iron mask that permanently bonded to his skin, adopting the identity of Doctor Doom. As Doom, he sought revenge on those he held responsible for his accident, particularly Reed Richards, and successfully led a revolution to take over Latveria.

After learning the secrets of the advanced Ovoids, Doom swaps bodies with Mister Fantastic but accidentally switches back, ending up trapped in Sub-Atomica. Doom takes over this micro-world, but is ousted by the Fantastic Four and thrown into space. Doom is saved by Kang the Conqueror and returns to Earth.

During John Byrne's 1980s run, Doctor Doom attempts to steal Terrax's cosmic powers, leading to a fight that destroys his body. He survives by transferring his consciousness to another human and is later restored to his original body by the Beyonder. On Battleworld, Doom briefly succeeds in stealing the Beyonder's power, but it is too vast for him to control, allowing the Beyonder to reclaim it.

When Susan Richards faces complications with her second pregnancy, Johnny Storm contacts Doom for help; Doom saves Susan's daughter and cures Johnny's inability to "flame off" by channeling Johnny's excess energy into her. Afterward, Doom names the baby Valeria and plotted to make her his familiar. Doom's lust for power leads him to sacrifice his long-lost love Valeria to demons for magical powers equivalent to years of study.

At the end of the first chapter of the X-Men event "Endangered Species", Doom is contacted by Beast to help reverse the effects of Decimation but rejects the offer, admitting he lacks talent in genetics. In Spider-Man: One More Day, Doom is approached by Spider-Man for help in saving Aunt May. Additionally, he transforms Latveria into a refugee camp for Atlanteans after the destruction of their kingdom, and allies with Loki to manipulate Thor into unwittingly releasing his Asgardian allies.

Doctor Doom defends Latveria against the Mighty Avengers after it is revealed that one of his satellites carried the 'Venom Virus' released in New York City, a result of hacking by one of Doom's enemies. During a battle with Iron Man and the Sentry, the time travel mechanism in his armor overloads, trapping them all in the past; Doom continues his relationship with Morgan le Fay using his time machine. Although he and Iron Man eventually return to the present, Doom leaves Iron Man in his exploding castle and is falsely incarcerated at the Raft. He later escapes the Raft in the "Secret Invasion" storyline, thanks to a virus uploaded into the prison's systems by the Skrulls.

After the Secret Invasion and the onset of "Dark Reign", Doctor Doom joins the Cabal with Norman Osborn, Emma Frost, Namor, Loki, and the Hood, seeking revenge for his tarnished reputation. Soon after, he allies with the isolationist Desturi to seize control of Wakanda. Doom severely injures T'Challa, the Black Panther, aiming to take Wakanda's vibranium for his own enhancement. However, T'Challa destroys the vibranium stockpile, believing his people can survive without it.

A guilt-ridden Doctor Doom, planning to abdicate his throne to Kristoff Vernard, is approached by Valeria, who asks for his help with her father. Noticing Doom's brain damage and memory loss from a previous battle, she offers to restore his mental faculties in exchange for assisting with the Fantastic Four, to which he agrees. Later, Doom attends Johnny Storm's funeral. Due to this agreement, Doom is recommended by Nathaniel Richards and Valeria von Doom to join the Future Foundation. Despite an angry attack from the Thing, Mister Fantastic and the Invisible Woman welcome him. Valeria learns that Kristoff is Doom's backup for restoring his memories, so they all head to Latveria, where a brain transfer machine successfully restores Doom's knowledge. Although Kristoff offers to return the throne to Doom, he declines, citing a promise to Valeria to help her defeat Mister Fantastic when needed.

During the confrontation between the Avengers and the X-Men, Doom allies with Magneto and others against Red Skull's Red Onslaught form. Doom usurps the power of the Beyonders with the aid of Doctor Strange and Molecule Man. He then creates a new Battleworld from the destroyed multiverse, claiming the role of God, and rewriting history to resurrect those he killed, while taking Sue as his wife and assigning roles to Franklin and Valeria. Ultimately, Reed and a group of survivors challenge Doom, and with Molecule Man's help, they restore the multiverse. Reed chooses to heal Doom's face using the Beyonder's power.

After Tony Stark's defeat by Captain Marvel, Doom discovers his calling to heal the world, reflecting on his dissatisfaction as a god. Inspired by Stark, he establishes Stark's legacy, fights for his brand of justice as the third Iron Man, and later conflicts with Mephisto disguised as Maker. Doom joins the Avengers and conceives a child with Amara Perera, prompting a group of villains led by the Hood to target him. The final battle occurs when the Hood tries to take over Stark Industries, leading to a confrontation between Doom and the Hood, during which Doom's face is severely burned by a demon. After the villains' defeat, Victor retreats to the ruins of Castle Doom.

Zora Vokuvic breaks into Castle Doom, demanding to see Doctor Doom and insisting that Latveria needs its leader back amid turmoil. Initially resistant, Doom is persuaded when Zora hands him his mask, prompting him to venture out and quell the civil war, vowing to restore the nation with his own strength.

Doctor Doom is framed for the destruction of the Antlion space station by Symkarian rebels and is killed while on the run, only to be sent back to Earth by Death as her "greatest servant". After fending off assassins including Taskmaster and MODOK, he sends Reed Richards his solution to the black hole threatening Earth and sets off to regain his power.

Doctor Doom puts Latveria on high alert amidst a vampire invasion, ordering border guards to maintain defenses while noting he will have new subjects to attend to. Doom informs Doctor Strange and Clea that Blade is possessed by Varnae and declares they need mages to bring back the Sun, requesting the title of Sorcerer Supreme. After being temporarily granted the title of Sorcerer Supreme, Doom removes the Darkforce surrounding Earth, which inadvertently allows vampires to survive in sunlight. However, he betrays his promise and refuses to return the title, making Strange disappear.

Doom uses his power as Sorcerer Supreme to take over the world, making world leaders pledge allegiance to him. Doom uses time magic to ensure his victory cannot be undone, but inadvertently kills Valeria Richards during a battle with the heroes who oppose him. Unable to resurrect Valeria by himself, Doom makes a deal with the Living Tribunal to resurrect her in exchange for his life.

=== Personality and motivation ===
Sean Howe observes that "Doctor Doom was insufferably pompous, but along with his haughty manner came a sort of honorable code; he always kept his word." Apparently, Doom has good intentions; in the Doomwar miniseries the panther goddess Bast assesses his soul and determines that he actually wishes the best for humanity, although he thinks the best way to achieve human peace is through his own authoritarian leadership.

=== Powers and abilities ===
Possessing a high level of intellect, Doom is a notorious scientist and engineer. He wears an armored battlesuit that includes an array of weapons and gives him superhuman strength. His armor is computer- assisted and nearly indestructible, shielding him from various forms of manipulation and housing advanced weaponry, including lasers, a force field generator, life support systems, and lethal electric shocks. Even without the armor, Doom is a skilled hand-to-hand combatant, capable of defeating strong opponents due to his knowledge of pressure points and skill with melee weapons.

In addition to being a genius, Doom is also a powerful sorcerer trained by Tibetan monks, Doom's magical powers are later enhanced by his lover Morgan le Fay. The magical spells Doom casts grant him additional powers and abilities including energy absorption and projection, technopathy, dimensional travel, healing, and the ability to summon hordes of demonic creatures. Doom placed second in a magic tournament held by the ancient sorcerer the Aged Genghis, and after Doctor Strange relinquished the title of Sorcerer Supreme, he acknowledged Doom's potential to assume that role. The alien Ovoids inadvertently taught Doom how to psionically transfer his consciousness into another being through eye contact.

== Themes and motifs ==
=== Latveria and politics ===
As the absolute monarch of Latveria, Doctor Doom rules the country with an iron fist and has frequently used his political power for his own personal benefit. Doom has reshaped the country in his own image, renaming both the capital city Hassenstadt and Castle Sabbat to Doomstadt and Castle Doom respectively. Doom frequently monitors the citizens of Latveria from Castle Doom and uses his Doombots to maintain order within his nation. Despite his infamous reputation as a supervillain, Doom has diplomatic immunity – allowing him to escape legal prosecution for most of his crimes he commits outside of Latveria. Doom also has total control of the nation's natural and technological resources, along with its manpower, economy, and military. Though from the outside it seems tyrannical, it appears that the Latverian people adore Doom, as exemplified by two of his apprentices, Zora Vukovic, (aka, Victorious) and Kristoff Vernard. Latveria has been given different locations in Central and Eastern Europe in different stories, initially in the Alps, later in the Banat region; the 2024 Marvel Encyclopedia describes it as located in the Balkans.

Doom's portrayal shifted repeatedly over the two decades after his debut to track American attitudes toward its own foreign policy. Hibbett suggests that Doom's leadership of Latveria represents US perceptions of Stalinism; the Fantastic Four stories of the 1960s depict Latveria as incapable of functioning without Doom, and his dictatorship as somewhat benevolent for them. In some stories, Doom's dictatorship functions independently and hence serves a project of anti-Communism.

Neal Curtis, using the political philosophy of Carl Schmitt and Giorgio Agamben, argues that Doom's authority in Battleworld depends on maintaining a permanent, partly manufactured state of emergency. Curtis reads Doom's harshest punishments of the Fantastic Four as a sovereign using banishment to define who belongs inside his order and who does not, and notes that Doom's godlike authority ultimately depends on Molecule Man whose power he has simply borrowed.

Writer Ryan North described One World Under Doom as dramatizing "the dangerous anti-democratic fantasy" of a single perfect ruler capable of fixing everything, arguing that "in one sense, this is a story of a fascist leader trying to take things over, and succeeding in doing that". He characterized Doom's own reasoning as: "Yes, OK, yes, that is fascism. But when I'm doing it, it's not fascism, it's the actual best guy doing it, so it's fine".

=== Mask and scar ===
The severity of Doom's facial scars, and the reason why Doom covers his face, has shifted from writer to writer. Jack Kirby said in a 1987 interview that he conceived Doom's mask and hood as symbols of "the classic conception of Death," modeled loosely on The Man in the Iron Mask. In a separate 1992 interview, Kirby stated, "He gets a cut on his chin! ... small as that scar may be." In Kirby's telling, Doom's perfectionism does the rest of the damage. "That scar grows so large that it affects his entire brain," Kirby said, calling the result "a totally human viewpoint. It's an inferiority complex."

Ed Brubaker retold the origin in the 2006 miniseries Books of Doom. "Following Kirby's example, I think it's better not to show it.", Brubaker said in a 2005 interview.

"I heard Jack Kirby talk about it once, and in Kirby's comics you never saw his face," Brubaker responded. "He smashes the mirror when he looks at it. Kirby, I heard, said that he thought it was just a tiny scar but that he was so vain that he felt his face was destroyed. But in the John Byrne version, he's got this big scar down the side of his face, but it's still nothing that cosmetic surgery couldn't probably fix. Then he puts the mask on his face before the metal is cooled and melts the rest of his face, because he doesn't want anyone to see his face anymore. I'm not dealing with that as much. I'm going with the Kirby version to some degree, but I'm just not showing his face. We don't see it."

— Ed Brubaker, Brubaker on Deflowering Doom, The Winter Soldier & The X-Men's Deadly Secret

=== Time machine and causality ===
Doctor Doom's time machine, introduced in his debut appearance in Fantastic Four #5 (1962), is the device that established time travel as a recurring plot mechanism in Marvel continuity. Literary scholars Chris Gavaler and Nathaniel Goldberg traced how the writers who picked up the device across the following five decades worked through several competing philosophical positions on the nature of time, often without settling on one and sometimes contradicting earlier stories outright.

In its first outing, Doom sends the Fantastic Four to the Caribbean after Blackbeard's treasure; disguised in period dress, Ben Grimm turns out to be the origin of the Blackbeard legend himself. Gavaler and Goldberg read this, along with a 1963 trip to ancient Egypt in which the time-displaced despot Rama-Tut is revealed to hail from the year 3000, as consistent with eternalism, the view that past, present and future all exist and cannot be undone by a visitor. When other characters commandeered the machine, they encountered different causal rules; Gavaler and Goldberg note a 1968 Avengers story utilizing Doom's invention actually presented a closed causal loop where attempting to observe the past inevitably causes it.

By the mid-1970s, writers began treating time as something that could branch rather than simply exist or not. In a 1976 Fantastic Four Annual, a sample of vibranium is accidentally sent to 1942 and falls into the hands of Baron Zemo, letting Nazi Germany emerge as the victor of World War II; when the Fantastic Four use Doom's machine to retrieve it, Reed Richards concludes they have arrived in "a different time continuum" rather than altered their own past. Other writers soon used Doom's displaced futures to explore what philosophers call the growing block theory, in which past and present are fixed but the future stays open. Writer-artist John Byrne revised the device's function again in 1983, having Reed conclude that it does not permit time travel at all: attempts to visit the past instead shunt the traveler sideways into an already-existing parallel universe, a point Byrne dramatizes by having the team discover a New Amsterdam version of the Daily Bugle standing in for the familiar New York one.

Doom's device took on a different function in Iron Man's title starting in 1981, when writers David Michelinie and Bob Layton sent Doom and Tony Stark to Arthurian Camelot and began Doom's recurring alliance with the sorceress Morgan le Fay. A 1989 sequel has Doom confront and kill a future version of himself, rejecting the idea that his fate is fixed: "The future is fluid. It can be changed."

Marvel's 2015 Secret Wars crossover erased the branching multiverse that decades of stories had built up around the device, replacing it with a single continuity going forward. A later retcon by writer Al Ewing attributes lingering instability in that timeline to Doom's own technology, coining the term "Doomlock" for a device that lets people cross into their own past and future. Gavaler and Goldberg conclude that no single theory of time actually governs the machine's many appearances across this history; each writer who inherited it effectively proposed, revised or quietly abandoned a philosophical position of their own, leaving Doom's invention less a fixed piece of fictional technology than an unresolved argument about causality that Marvel has carried, mostly unintentionally, since 1962.

== Supporting characters ==
=== Allies ===
Doctor Doom and Storm have frequently interacted since 1981, when Arcade lured the X-Men to Doom's castle. Doom temporarily imprisoned Storm after she attempted to distract him, but the conflict ended without further hostilities. In 1988, they allied to destroy a factory polluting Latveria. Their dynamic became antagonistic during the 2010 Doomwar storyline. Doom invaded Wakanda and forced Storm, then Wakanda's queen, to unlock its vibranium vault, prompting her to vow revenge. While Storm served as regent of Arakko, she and Doom engaged in several diplomatic standoffs. During "One World Under Doom", Doom offered to claim mutantkind as his subjects and appoint Storm as their ambassador. She rejected the proposal, viewing it as an attempt to exploit mutant suffering.

=== Romantic interests ===
One of Doom's romantic partners is the sorceress Morgan le Fay, whom he first sought out after learning she was the only person capable of saving his mother from Hell. He traveled back to her time period to recruit her, and she agreed to help on the condition that he lead her army of Excalibur-slain undead soldiers. Iron Man intervened before the deal could be completed, chasing Doom back to his time period and forcing le Fay into hiding, which delayed Doom's rescue of his mother for years and eventually pushed him to seek Doctor Strange's help instead. Le Fay foresaw through precognition that Doom would betray her, and rather than wait for it to happen she tried to kill him at several points across his own life, first as a child and then as an adult, until Doom and Norman Osborn banished her to 1,000,000 B.C.

=== Enemies ===
In Marvel Team-Up #43 (1972), Doom joined Spider-Man and Vision to stop the Puritan theologian Cotton Mather, who had brought Scarlet Witch back in time to the Salem witch trials (1692–1693). After the three of them were defeated, they were freed by Moondragon, who helped them to kill Dark Rider and to defeat Cotton Mather. Once the immediate threat was defeated, Doom made a point of reminding the heroes, on his way back to his own time, that they would return to being enemies the next time they met.

In Marvel Super-Heroes #8 (1992), created by Steve Ditko and Will Murray, Doctor Doom encounters Squirrel Girl while ambushing Iron Man. When Squirrel Girl and her colony of squirrels disrupt the attack, Doom is forced to retreat to avoid physical defeat. Doom's defeat turned into a running joke across subsequent Marvel titles, with later stories explicitly confirming it was the real Doctor Doom rather than a Doombot.

Iron Man has been described as a mirror image version of Doom. Writer David Michelinie called Doom "my all-time favorite" villain he had no hand in creating, describing him as "Tony's reflection in a dark mirror". After the Secret Wars (2015) event, a reformed Doom helped Stark defeat Madame Masque, and later assumed the Iron Man identity, before a battle with the Hood scarred his face again.

=== Alternate versions ===
In the Doom 2099 series (1993–1996), created by writer John Francis Moore and artist Pat Broderick, Doctor Doom resurfaces in a dystopic late 21st century. Using technology derived from the original Doom, he attempts to establish order in the chaotic world.

Doom appears in Neil Gaiman's miniseries Marvel 1602 (2003), illustrated by Andy Kubert and Richard Isanove. Named Count Otto von Doom, he is featured as the ruler of Latveria and the assassin of Queen Elizabeth.

== Reception and legacy ==
Doctor Doom has been described as a modern day adaptation of Faust, being driven by a thirst for power while not conforming to the boundaries and rules of society. Mariano Turzi argues that Doom fits the "Rich Boy" literary archetype coined by Francis Scott Fitzgerald in 1926, along with Marvel supervillain Kingpin, and DC Comics' supervillains Lex Luthor and Adrian Veidt. Doom has been further compared to Lex Luthor due to their similar ambition and intellect.

Michael Kaminski suggests that Doctor Doom is a likely precursor and influence on the portrayal of Darth Vader in the Star Wars franchise. He writes: "Not only is his visual design very similar to Darth Vader's but the character's backstory is as well; it may be argued that this is coincidental, as masked characters in literature are often encased in their coverings to hide deformities, reaching back to 1909's Phantom of the Opera by Gaston Leroux, but being such an important villain in the comic book world Doctor Doom's influence may very well have been a conscious one." Chris Knowles makes a similar point, citing them both being scarred men encased in armor, former "promising young mystics" haunted by the deaths of their mothers, and men who eventually became tyrants. Gina Misiroglu states Doom became a symbol of the "horrific side of science", and stated he later inspired Darth Vader and Baron Karza from the comic book Micronauts.

The rapper MF Doom took his name and persona from Doctor Doom.

=== Romani representation ===
"[It can] be seen that Stan Lee and Jack Kirby knew the history of the Roma well and that it [this history] was an important part of the comic world created by them. When the background story of Doctor Doom was created, in the mid-1960s, the Roma of Yugoslavia, Romania, and other East European countries began to fight for equal rights. This struggle for emancipation is also reflected by the story of Doctor Doom."

— German Roma Center e. V

Doom's 1964 origin story places him in a Romani community, referred to in the comic as a "Gypsy" tribe. The flashback depicting his parents' deaths falls roughly a generation before Victor's college years, plausibly the late 1930s; one analysis situates the scene against the real internment of Roma across parts of Europe during that period, camps that after 1938 increasingly fed into the Nazi concentration camp system.

Before leaving for America, young Victor uses his mother's inherited "magic potions and strange scientific secrets" to steal from corrupt aristocrats and give the proceeds to his own people as a Robin Hood figure. Johannes Valentin Korff argues this makes Doom unusual for the period, being a "Gypsy" figure written as the protagonist of his own origin story rather than a supporting character or a hero's obstacle. Korff places the choice inside a broader pattern at Marvel in the mid-1960s of building new superhumans out of persecuted backgrounds, pointing to Scarlet Witch and Quicksilver's same-year origin, in which they flees a village pogrom, and the 1966 debut of Black Panther.

Korff also argues that the story avoids stereotyping vengeance as a trait unique to Victor's Romani heritage. Instead, violence is distributed across the entire cast; Latverians, Romani, Victor, and the baron are all trapped in an escalating cycle of revenge. He connects this to how the story handles Doom's later authority, drawing on literary historian Klaus-Michael Bogdal's concept of the "Gypsy Empire," a stock setting in older fiction where a "Gypsy" ruler's menace comes from operating at society's margins. Korff argues Doom inverts that convention by ruling from the center of a modern state rather than its edges, so that his threat comes from an excess of science and civilization rather than a lack of it.

Ed Brubaker's Books of Doom kept the persecution backstory but altered its details. In this version, the baron's campaign against Victor's community is left without a stated cause, and Cynthia von Doom's death follows from a demon she summons herself and cannot control, one that goes on to kill soldiers and villagers indiscriminately before the villagers turn on her. Korff traces a direct line from Doom's origin to a 1978-1979 Avengers arc that gave Scarlet Witch and Quicksilver a Romani foster father, Django Maximoff. Korff argues this Avengers arc later inspired a wave of Romani characters being created or retconned to being Romani, including Gypsy, Gypsy Moth, Meggan, Scorpio Rose, and Magneto (Note: Magneto's 1993 Romani background was later retconned as a cover identity for his Jewish heritage.).

Writer Alyssa Shotwell criticized the portrayal of Doom alongside other Romani or Romani-coded characters like Nightcrawler, Scarlet Witch, and Quicksilver. She argued that these characters cluster disproportionately around sorceresses, fortune tellers and circus performers, and she urged future adaptations to bring in Romani historians and consultants. Conversely, the German advocacy group Roma Center e.V. praised creators Stan Lee and Jack Kirby for their understanding of Romani history. The group connected Doom's 1960s creation to contemporary Romani emancipation movements in Eastern Europe.

== In other media ==
As the archenemy of the Fantastic Four, Doctor Doom has appeared in various forms of Marvel-related media and been featured in almost every adaptation of the Fantastic Four franchise, including films, television series, and video games.

Most notably in film, the character is played by Julian McMahon in Fantastic Four (2005) and Fantastic Four: Rise of the Silver Surfer (2007). He is played by Toby Kebbell in Fantastic Four (2015). Robert Downey Jr. portrays the character in the Marvel Cinematic Universe, first making cameo appearances in The Fantastic Four: First Steps (2025), Avengers Endgame: Encore (2026) and the Disney+ miniseries VisionQuest (2026). Downey is set to reprise the role in Avengers: Doomsday (2026) and Avengers: Secret Wars (2027).
