= Double feature =

Exhibition of two films for the price of one

A poster advertising American International Pictures' double feature of Die, Monster, Die! and Planet of the Vampires.

The double feature is a motion picture industry practice in which movie theaters would exhibit two films for the price of one, supplanting an earlier format in which the presentation of one feature film would be followed by various short subject reels.

== Operatic use ==
Opera houses staged two operas together for the sake of providing long performance for the audience. This was related to one-act or two-act short operas that were otherwise commercially hard to stage alone. A prominent example is the double-bill of Pagliacci with Cavalleria rusticana first staged on 22 December 1893 by the Met (NYC). The two operas have since been frequently performed as a double bill, a pairing referred to in the operatic world colloquially as "Cav and Pag".

== Origin and format ==
The double feature originated in the later 1930s. Though the dominant presentation model, consisting of all or some of the following, continued well into the 1940s:

- One or more live acts
- An animated cartoon short subject
- One or more live-action comedy shorts
- One or more novelty shorts
- A newsreel
- The main feature film

With the widespread arrival of sound film in U.S. theaters in 1929, many independent exhibitors began dropping the then-dominant presentation model. Movie theaters suffered a downturn in business in the early days of the Great Depression.

Theater owners decided they could both attract more customers and save on costs if they offered two movies for the price of one. The tactic worked; audiences considered the cost of a theater ticket good value for several hours of escapist and varied entertainment and the practice became a standard pattern of programming.

In the typical 1930s double bill, the screening began with a variety program consisting of trailers, a newsreel, a cartoon and/or a short film preceding a low-budget second feature (the B-movie), followed by a short interlude. Finally, the high-budget main feature (the A-movie) ran.

A neighborhood theatre running a double feature won out over a higher-priced first-run theatre with only one feature film. The major studios took note of this, and began making their own B features using the technicians and sets of the studio and featuring stars on their way up or on their way down. The major studios also made film series featuring recurring characters.

Although the double feature put many short comedy producers out of business, it was the primary source of revenue for smaller Hollywood studios, such as Republic and Monogram, that specialized in B movie production.

In 1910, double features were banned in France. The ban was lifted in 1953 subject to the condition that one of the features had to be at least 10 years old.

== Decline ==
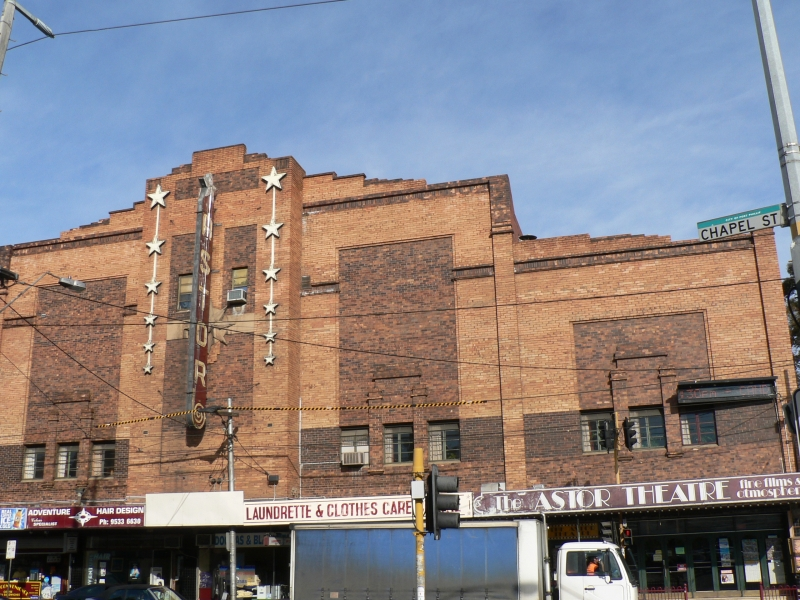
The Astor Theatre in Melbourne, Australia has shown double features since its opening in 1936

The double feature arose partly because of a studio practice known as "block booking," a form of tying, in which major Hollywood studios required theaters to buy B-movies along with the more desirable A-movies. In 1948, the U.S. Supreme Court decided that the practice was illegal in United States v. Paramount Pictures, Inc., contributing to the end of the studio system.

Without block booking, the studios did not have an incentive to make their own B-features again. But audiences at first-run movie palaces, neighborhood theatres, and drive-in theaters, still expected a program of two features. In 1948, nearly two-thirds of the movie houses in the United States were advertising double features.

Following the Supreme Court ruling of 1948, known as the Paramount Consent Decree, the source for the second feature changed. The second feature could be:

- a major studio re-release of an older feature,
- an older feature re-released from firms that specialised in acquiring and re-releasing older films such as Realart and Astor Pictures,
- a low-budget feature contracted from a smaller studio.

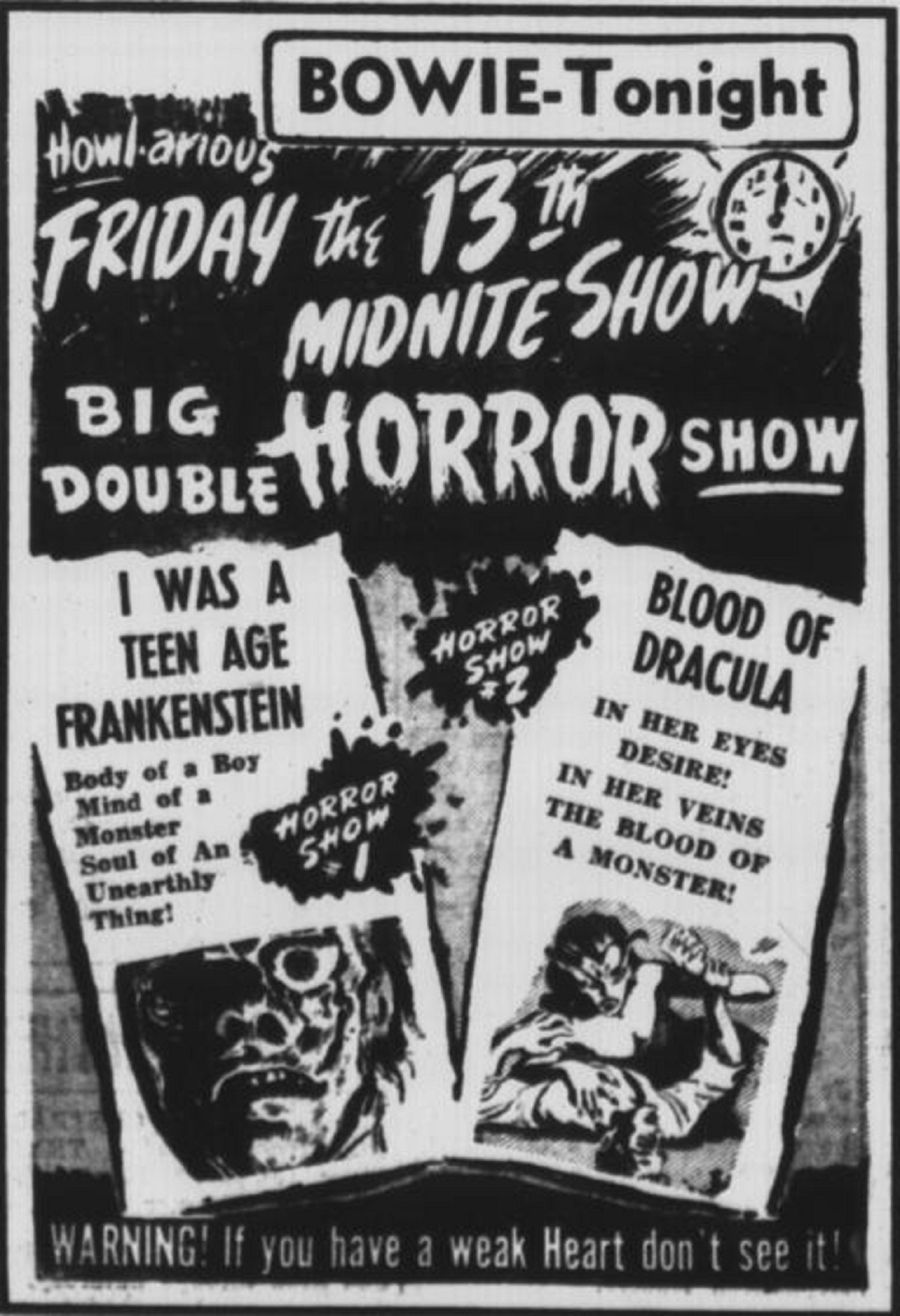
1957 theater advertisement for midnight screening of double-feature B-movie horror films, I Was a Teenage Frankenstein and Blood of Dracula

James H. Nicholson and Samuel Z. Arkoff formed American International Pictures in the mid-1950s to produce and distribute low-budget features. They discovered exhibitors were only interested in buying their pictures as supporting features (a B-movie) at a flat rate. Once Nicholson and Arkoff combined two features into a program, sold as a double bill, with each picture given equal billing in the advertising and backed up with an explosive advertising campaign, theaters were willing to exhibit them on a percentage basis. The exhibitors may have kept a larger share of the box office than the major distributors demanded, but AIP's share of the box office was enough to keep it from going out of business.

The double bill was sold on a percentage basis and each feature was given equal billing in newspaper advertisements and promotional materials. Since the trailers and advertising promoted the two titles, exhibitors were discouraged from separating the features in the package. To distributors and exhibitors, it was a substantially different policy than the standard double feature in that it was not a top-billed A feature combined with a minor-billed support feature sold at a flat rate (a B-movie).

By the mid-1960s, double features had mostly left in non–drive ins in favor of the modern single-feature screening, in which only one feature film is exhibited. However, double bills of popular series that had previously been run as a single feature, such as the James Bond and Matt Helm series in the superspy genre, and the Man with No Name and The Stranger spaghetti Westerns were re-released together by the main studios.

The end of the first-run double feature also saw the end of continuous screenings, an exhibition policy where a theater opened at 10:30 or 11:00 AM and ran the program without breaks until 12:00 midnight. Customers bought tickets and entered the theater at any time during the program.

The Rocky Horror Picture Show and its 1973 stage predecessor The Rocky Horror Show reference the practice in their opening song "Science Fiction/Double Feature" and are largely inspired by B-movies presented in these showings. The movie itself was and still is often shown as a double feature with Shock Treatment, a loose follow-up by the same directors.

While most cinemas have long discontinued the practice of showing double features, it has nostalgic appeal. The Astor Theatre in St. Kilda, Melbourne, Australia, established in 1936, continues the tradition of the double feature to this day. Many repertory houses continue to show two films, usually related in some way, back to back.

Short films still occasionally precede the feature presentation (Pixar films generally feature a short, for example), but the double feature is now effectively extinct in first-run movie theaters in the U.S.

In summer 1989, Paramount's Star Trek V: The Final Frontier and Indiana Jones and the Last Crusade were re-released to theaters as a double bill in response to Star Trek V′s individual box office performance.

During the 1990s, many videotapes that contained two films on the same tape (with the second often a sequel to the first) were described as "double features," a practice that was later extended to DVDs.

== The 21st century years ==
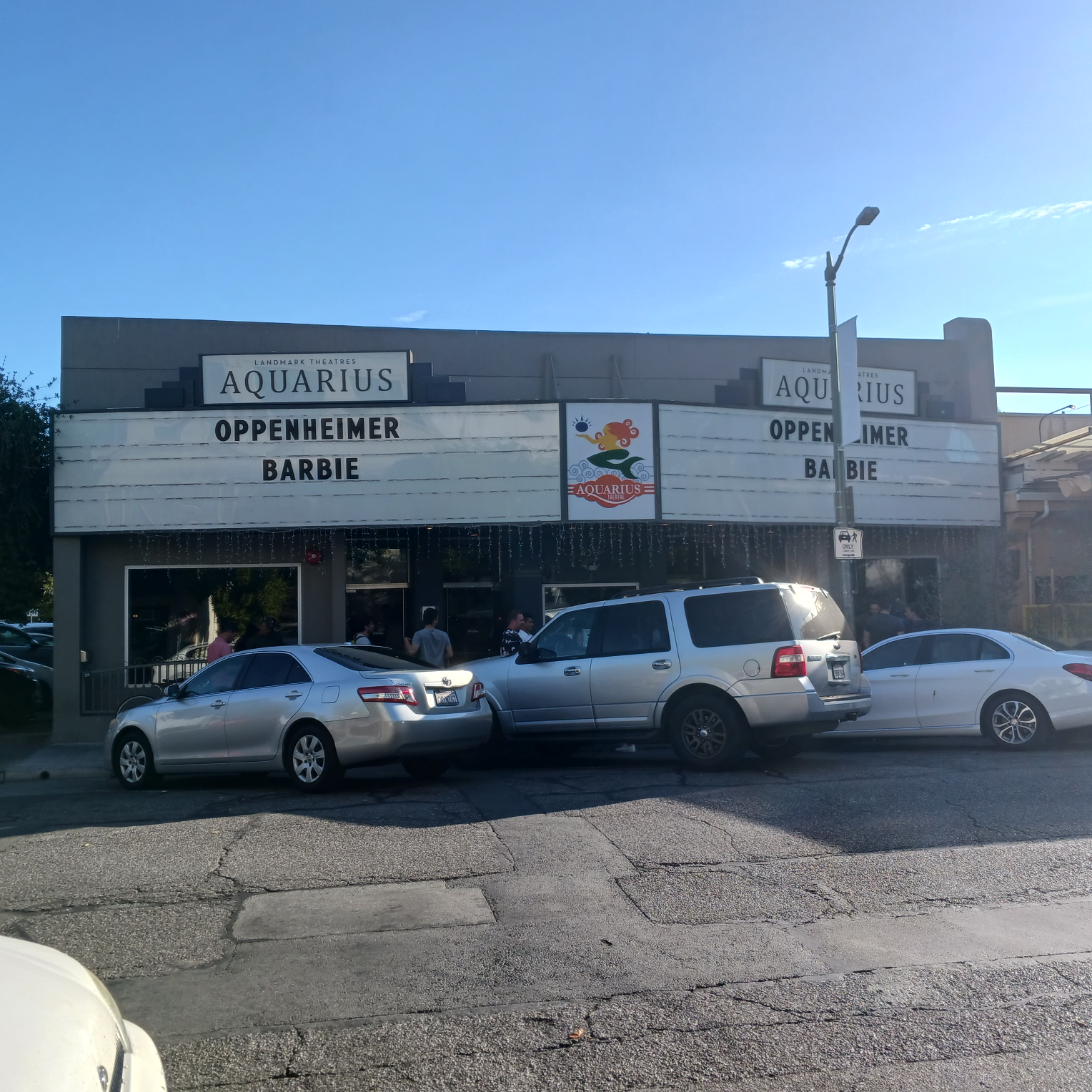
The Aquarius duplex theater in Palo Alto, California, presented simultaneous viewings of Oppenheimer and Barbie on its two screens in 2023.

In 2007, filmmakers Quentin Tarantino and Robert Rodriguez released their individual films Planet Terror and Death Proof as a double feature under the title Grindhouse, edited together with fake exploitation film trailers and 1970s-era snipes in order to replicate the experience of viewing a double feature in a grindhouse theater. Although Grindhouse received critical acclaim, it was a complete financial flop in the United States. The films were screened individually in international markets and on DVD.

Another recent double feature was the Duel Project, when Japanese directors Ryuhei Kitamura and Yukihiko Tsutsumi created competing films to be shown and voted on by the premier audience.

One of the Marvel Animated Features, a direct-to-video series features Hulk vs. which is a double feature, has Hulk vs. Wolverine and Hulk vs. Thor.

More recently, double features of re-released popular films hit the big screen. The first was of the re-release of Pixar's Toy Story and Toy Story 2 that started on October 2, 2009, before the release of Toy Story 3 the following year. Both films were distributed in Disney Digital 3-D in select theaters. The next double feature was a re-release of Twilight and The Twilight Saga: New Moon on June 29, 2010, shortly before the midnight screening of The Twilight Saga: Eclipse in select theaters. In February 2011, it was announced that the 14th Pokémon movie Victini and the Black Hero: Zekrom and Victini and the White Hero: Reshiram, due in July, would be released as a double feature, though both films are actually "versions" of each other, with differences related to plot points and character designs varying between the version being watched.

In 2022, Russian cinema launched double features with U.S. and Russian films. The first film, a Hollywood blockbuster, is designated as "free pre-feature service". The second film, designated as main feature, is Russian patriotic propaganda movie or short film (tickets are sold for it).

In 2023, many theaters began offering double features for the live-action film version of Mattel's Barbie and biopic drama Oppenheimer as part of the "Barbenheimer" phenomenon. The two films – which were noted for their tonal and genre contrast – were released on July 21 in the United States and many other countries in Europe.
