= Grindhouse =

Low-budget movie theater

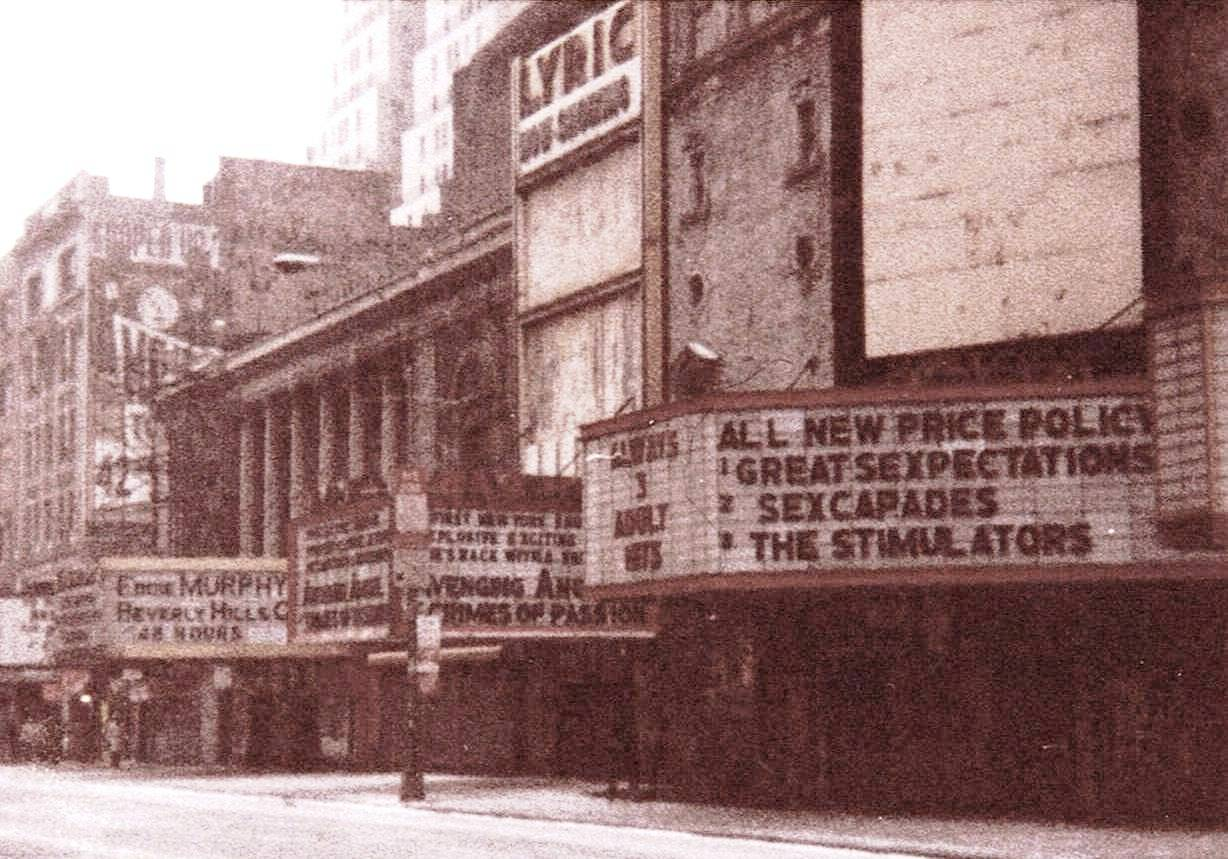
42nd Street in 1985 Times Square, depicting the Lyric, one of several grindhouses at the time

A grindhouse or action house is an American term for a theatre that mainly shows low-budget horror, splatter, foreign and exploitation films for adults. According to historian David Church, this theater type was named after the "grind policy", a film-programming strategy dating back to the early 1920s that continuously showed films at cut-rate ticket prices that typically rose over the course of each day. This exhibition practice was markedly different from the era's more common practice of fewer shows per day and graduated pricing for different seating sections in large urban theatres, which were typically studio-owned.

== History ==
Due to these theaters' proximity to controversially sexualized forms of entertainment like burlesque, the term "grindhouse" has often been erroneously associated with burlesque theaters in urban entertainment areas such as 42nd Street in New York City, where bump and grind dancing and striptease were featured. In the film Lady of Burlesque (1943) one of the characters refers to one such burlesque theatre on 42nd Street as a "grindhouse," but Church points out the primary definition in the Oxford English Dictionary is for a movie theater distinguished by three criteria:

1. Shows a variety of films, in continuous succession
2. Low admission fees
3. Films screened are frequently of poor quality or low (artistic) merit

Church states the first use of the term "grind house" was in a 1923 Variety article, which may have adopted the contemporary slang usage of "grind" to refer to the actions of barkers exhorting potential patrons to enter the venue.

Double, triple, and "all night" bills on a single admission charge often encouraged patrons to spend long periods of time in the theaters.

Because grindhouse theaters were associated with a lower class audience, grindhouse theaters gradually became perceived as disreputable places that showed disreputable films, regardless of the variety of films – including subsequent-run Hollywood films – that were actually screened. Similar second-run screenings are held at discount theaters and neighborhood theatres; the distinguishing characteristics of the "grindhouse" are its typical urban setting and the programming of first-run films of low merit, not predominantly second-run films which had received wide releases.

=== Television pressure ===
The introduction of television greatly eroded the audience for local and single-screen movie theaters, many of which were built during the cinema boom of the 1930s. In combination with urban decay after white flight out of older city areas in the mid to late 1960s, changing economics forced these theaters to either close or offer something that television could not. In the 1970s, many of these theaters became venues for exploitation films, such as adult pornography and sleaze, or slasher horror, and dubbed martial arts films from Hong Kong.

=== Content ===
Films shot for and screened at grindhouses characteristically contain large amounts of sex, violence, or bizarre subject matter. One featured genre were "roughies" or sexploitation films, a mix of sex, violence and sadism. Quality varied, but low budget production values and poor print quality were common. Critical opinions varied regarding typical grindhouse fare, but many films acquired cult following and critical praise.

=== Decline ===
By the mid 1980s, home video and cable movie channels threatened to render the grindhouse obsolete. By the end of the decade, these theaters had vanished from Los Angeles's Broadway and Hollywood Boulevard, New York City's Times Square and San Francisco's Market Street. Another example was the Jolar Theater in Nashville, Tennessee, on lower Broadway, which was active until it burned down on April 14, 1978.

By the mid-1990s, these particular theaters had all but disappeared from the United States. Excerpts from Sleazoid Express were compiled into a book of the same title by authors Bill Landis and Michelle Clifford; the book discusses various exploitation subgenres as well as New York City's 42nd Street grindhouses themselves.

== Gallery ==
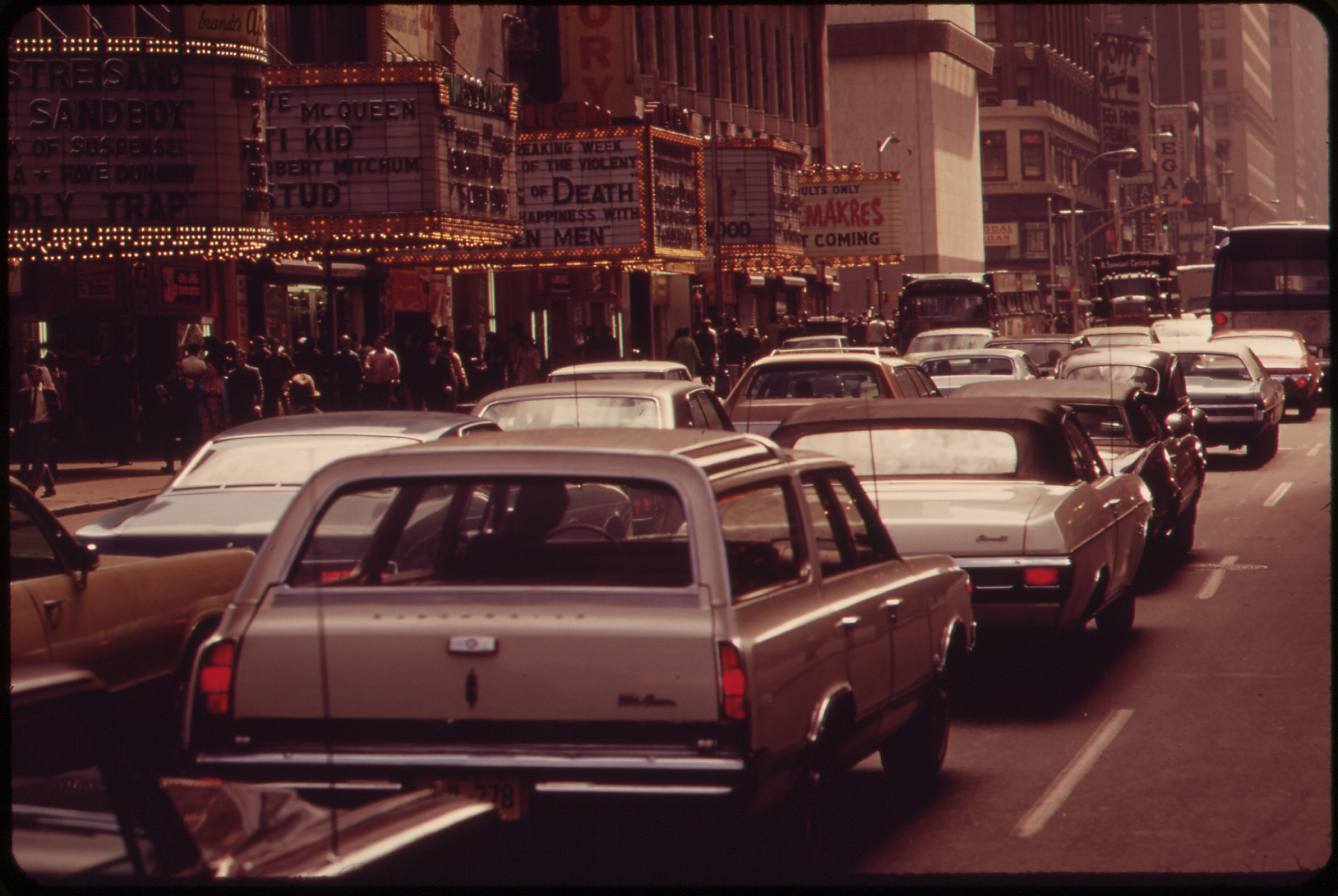
Grindhouse marquees along 42nd St (New York City, 1973)

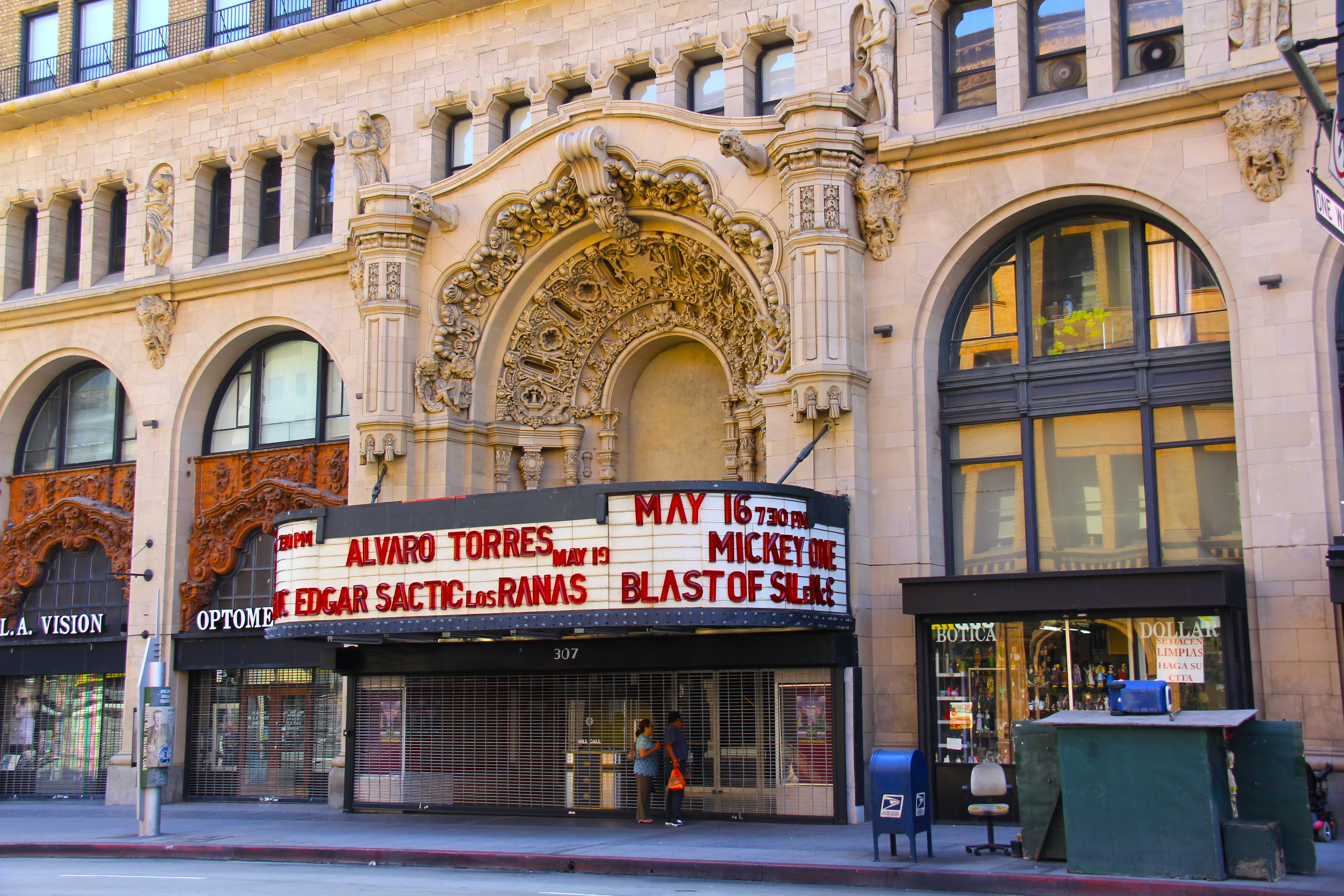
Million Dollar Theater in Los Angeles (2012), marquee advertising Mickey One and Blast of Silence

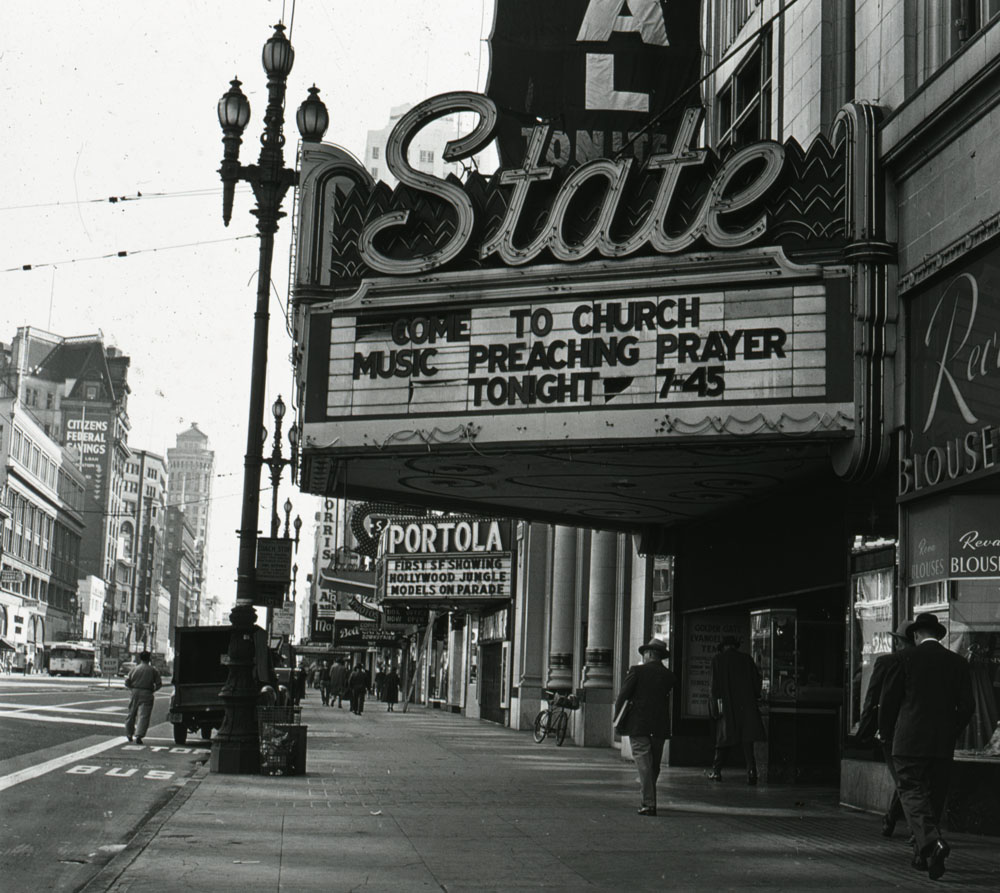
Theaters in San Francisco (1956)

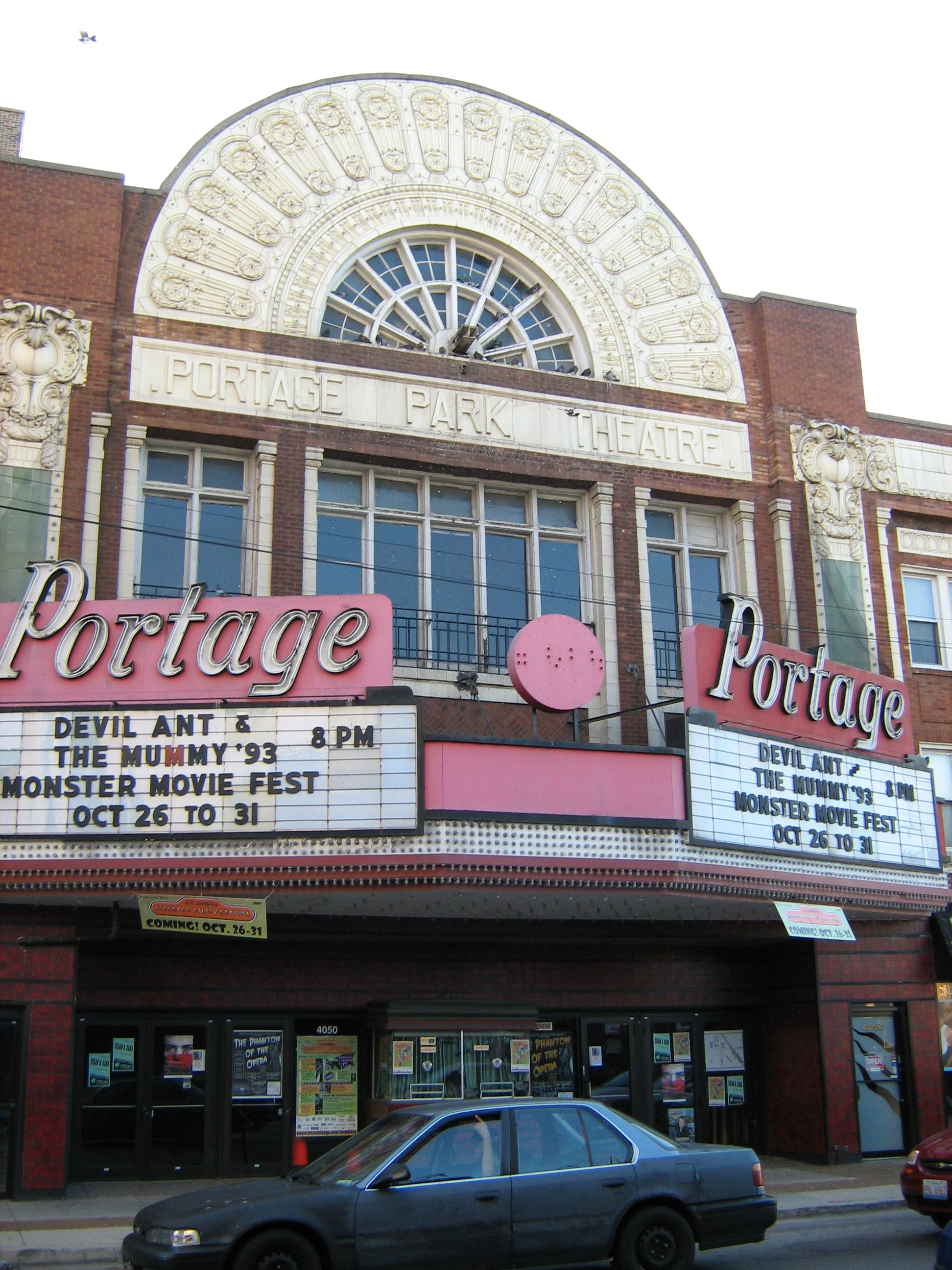
Portage Theatre in Chicago (2007)

== See also ==
- Adult movie theater

== General and cited references ==
- Church, David (2015). Grindhouse Nostalgia: Memory, Home Video and Exploitation Film Fandom. Edinburgh: Edinburgh University Press. ISBN 978-0-7486-9910-0.
- Fisher, Austin; Walker, Johnny, eds. (2016). Grindhouse—Cultural Exchange on 42nd Street, and Beyond. New York City: Bloomsbury Academic. ISBN 978-1-6289-2747-4.
