= 28 mm =

28 mm (twenty-eight millimeter):

- 28 mm film
- 28 mm scale of miniature figures
