= First run (filmmaking) =

Portion of a film life-cycle directly following its release in theaters

In cinematic parlance, a film in its first run has been recently released. In North America, new films attract the majority of their theatrical viewers in the first few weeks after their release. In North America, different movie theaters pay different rates to show films depending on how recently they have been released. In 1946, the Supreme Court of the United States found major film distributors in violation of antitrust laws when they precluded independent theaters from screening first-run films.

Some older, smaller, or poorly outfitted neighborhood or discount theatres, or those in less desirable locations, specialize in showing films during their second run. These theatres get to keep a larger share of the ticket fees and often charge a lower ticket price.

== See also ==
- Direct-to-video
- First-run syndication
