= Victor Animatograph Corporation =

Maker of projection equipment

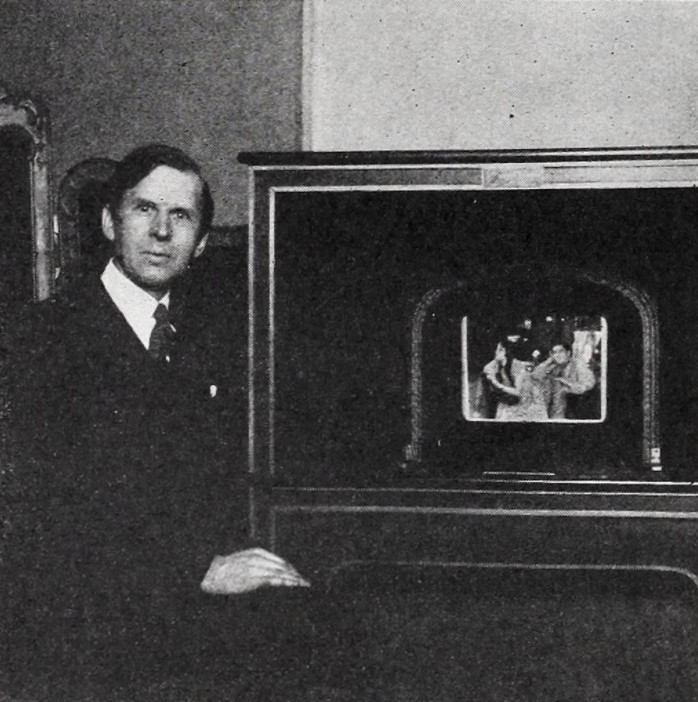
Victor in 1925

The Victor Animatograph Corporation was a maker of projection equipment founded in 1910 in Davenport, Iowa by Swedish-born American inventor Alexander F. Victor.

The firm introduced its first 16 mm camera and movie projector on August 12, 1923, the same year Eastman Kodak introduced the Ciné-Kodak and Kodascope. Victor advertised through his entire career thereafter that he had marketed the first 16mm equipment, but his claim was incorrect by several weeks, since the Cine-Kodak had been introduced in July, substantially earlier than Victor's August marketing date. Victor's first 16mm camera was a hand-cranked rectangular aluminum box designed for the additional film economy of cranking only 14 frames per second instead of the standard sixteen. A later version of this first Victor was driven by an electric motor. Neither camera sold in large numbers, but Victor followed in 1927 with a more successful camera modeled on the Bell & Howell Filmo. Victor offered many models of 16mm projectors, most with only minor variations, but prior to military contracts won during World War II, all were made and sold in very small numbers, from 20 units to usually no more than a couple of thousand units. The company was a large producer of lantern slides using their "Featherweight" method- a one piece glass positive with a durable emulsion framed by a cardboard mat.

== See also ==
- 28 mm film
