= 28 mm film =

Rare historical motion picture film gauge

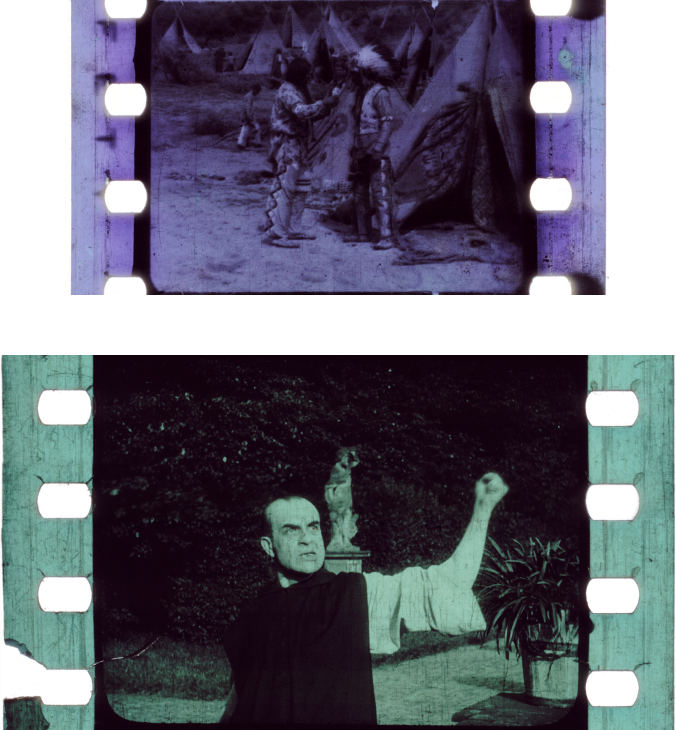
28 mm diacetate film compared to 35 mm nitrate film

28 mm film was introduced by the Pathé Film Company in 1912 under the name Pathé Kok. Geared toward the home market, 28 mm utilized diacetate film stock rather than the flammable nitrate commonly used in 35 mm. The film gauge was deliberately chosen such that it would be uneconomical to slit 35 mm nitrate film.

Pathé in France and later Victor in the United States printed reduction prints (usually, although not always, abridged) of popular films for home rental, designed to be used in Pathéscope Cinematograph or Victor Animatograph projectors. World War I stopped European production of 28 mm. It continued in North America until 1920 before ceasing entirely. Shortly after, 9.5 mm and 16 mm would take the amateur film gauge role 28 mm had once filled.

== History of 28 mm film ==
=== Pathé Frères ===
Pathé Frères was founded by brothers Charles and Émile Pathé. The company had two divisions, a phonograph and a cinema portion, which were established in 1894 and 1896 respectively. Within fifteen years of its establishment, Pathé Frères was arguably the largest entertainment company in the world. Their phonograph materials were available at prices that the general public could afford. The phonograph division along with the film industries of the company allowed Pathé Frères to become an international company with offices in Russia and the United States. They had purchased all the rights to the films of Georges Méliès as well as the Lumiere Brothers' cine camera/projector patents within the first decade of the twentieth century. Pathé created an improved studio camera that ruled the market in Europe and America as well as making his own film stock. In 1902 Pathé Frères opened a production facility at Vincennes where they made films in large numbers. In 1906 Pathé Frères began to market themselves to the upper-class society in France by building the world's first luxury cinema, the Omnia-Pathé. About two years later they began trying to bring cinema into the home of those who were visiting their cinema.

=== The 28 mm Pathéscope K.O.K. cine projector ===
In 1910 Arthur Roussel was hired to build a machine that would enable the public to view a film inside their home. Pathé Frères introduced a 28 mm film size for home use. 28 mm diacetate film was preferable for non-professional use because it was not flammable like 35 mm film with a nitrate base, and usage of the 28 mm film also gave Pathé Frères exclusivity, by way of patents. The 28 mm wide film had one sprocket hole per frame on one edge of the film, 3 on the other; the large image size of 19 mm x 14 mm allowed the projected picture to be of a very high quality. The 28 mm Pathéscope K.O.K. cine-projector was patented in 1911. This projector featured dynamo lighting which was "powered by a belt from a large flywheel connected to the main shaft. The handle had to be manually turned in order to project a 30-inch picture. The projector "sold for 30 dollars which included two printed films, a screen, metal carrying case and cleaning outfit.

=== 28 mm printed films ===
Not only were 28 mm printed films safer, they were also more efficient than 35 mm film. 28 mm film held 20.5 frames per foot as opposed to 16 frames per foot on 35 mm film. "A 400-foot reel of 28 mm film was equal to over 500 feet of 35 mm film. Many films were transferred from 35 mm format to the 28 mm format. In later years films were transferred onto 9.5 mm film, but would often have content taken out in order to be a length that would fit onto a more compact reel; however the films transferred from 35 mm to 28 mm format were left uncut. The first series of films transferred contained 48 motion pictures that ranged from 45 to 90 meters long.

=== 28 mm Pathéscope K.O.K. Cine-Camera ===
1912 brought about the K.O.K. 28 mm camera or the Pathéscope. The camera cost 42 dollars and came with a tripod, something that was absolutely necessary to make use of this heavy hand-turned cine-camera. The Pathéscope was similar to the Pathé 35 mm camera. It was hand-cranked and mounted on a tripod just like the rest of the cameras from the early 20th century. The camera ended up being a huge success. By 1913 it was being used in the UK and in the United States. The camera was used in homes as well as schools, churches and clubs. By 1918 over 10,000 machines had been sold and over 25,000,000 feet of positive film had been produced. As World War I grew more intense, production in France came to a halt, but sales continued in the United States and Canada.

=== Pathéscope in the United States ===
Established in 1913, the Pathéscope company of America was given 1,000,000 dollars by Pathé Frères in order to distribute Pathéscopes and Pathéscope films across the United States. Demand for 28 mm Pathéscope films became so high that a "specially designed and completely equipped motion picture laboratory and factory was built in Long Island City in order to produce films that specifically catered to the American public's wants and needs. In 1916 Willard Beech Cook began working on a new 28 mm projector that would be smaller in order to bring production cost down. His machine was motor-driven and weighed 23 pounds. By 1920 there were almost 1,200 films available in 28 mm format on 1600 reels. Most of these films could be found in various Pathéscope film libraries which were located in the larger cities in the United States. Many of the films were originally created in Europe, but eventually the selection contained American pictures starring actors such as Harold Lloyd and Charlie Chaplin.

=== Downfall of 28 mm ===
Several years after the conclusion of World War I, 28 mm film began to decline in popularity. Pathé Frères itself released a 9.5 mm film, which was preferred due to its smaller size. What ultimately caused the demise of 28 mm film, however, was Kodak's introduction of a 16 mm gauge in 1923. Kodak’s larger film library was superior in both scale and quality, so much so that when Willard Beech Cook was asked to run it in 1924 he accepted the job offer. The American Pathéscope 28 mm film library stayed open in New York City for a brief period of time while Kodak's 16 mm library was running, but in 1926, Kodak took over his film-stock factory. and Pathéscope was officially out of business in the United States. The post-war environment in Europe was not any kinder to Pathé Frères. Big-budget Hollywood pictures such as The Birth of a Nation had grabbed the attention of the public in France, and 28 mm film was no longer profitable. Charles Pathé sold the remainder of his company in Europe in 1929 to Bernard Natan. The company remained afloat under the Pathé name until 1934, before being completely disbanded.

== Archive ==
The Academy Film Archive houses a 28 mm collection which includes over 100 reels of film in the Pathé 28 mm format.

== Technical specifications ==
- 20.5 frames per foot (14 mm per frame)
- vertical pulldown
- 1.36:1 aspect ratio
- 3 perforation on both sides per frame (US and Canada)
- 3 perforation on the left and 1 on the right per frame (Europe)

== See also ==
- List of film formats

== Notes ==
- Fielding, R., ed. A Technological History of Motion Pictures and Television. Los Angeles, CA: University of California Press, 1967.
