= Kodascope =

Kodascope is a name created by Eastman Kodak Company for the projector it placed on the market in 1923 as part of the first 16mm motion picture equipment. The original Kodascope was part of an outfit that included the Cine-Kodak camera, tripod, Kodascope projector, projection screen, and film splicer, all of which sold together for $335. By 1924, Victor Animatograph Corporation and Bell and Howell had placed 16mm projectors on the market, so Kodak eliminated the requirement to purchase the equipment as a complete outfit and sold the projector separately. Kodascope was retained as the primary marketing name for 16mm projectors throughout their production life at Kodak.

One specific Kodascope was the 'Bedaux Measurement Cine-Kodak' which was produced for use in conjunction with the Bedaux System.

It was also used to name Kodak's film rental library system. Kodascope Library, which operated from 1924 to 1939, and offered both educational and commercially released films on 16mm film and, from 1932, on 8mm film.

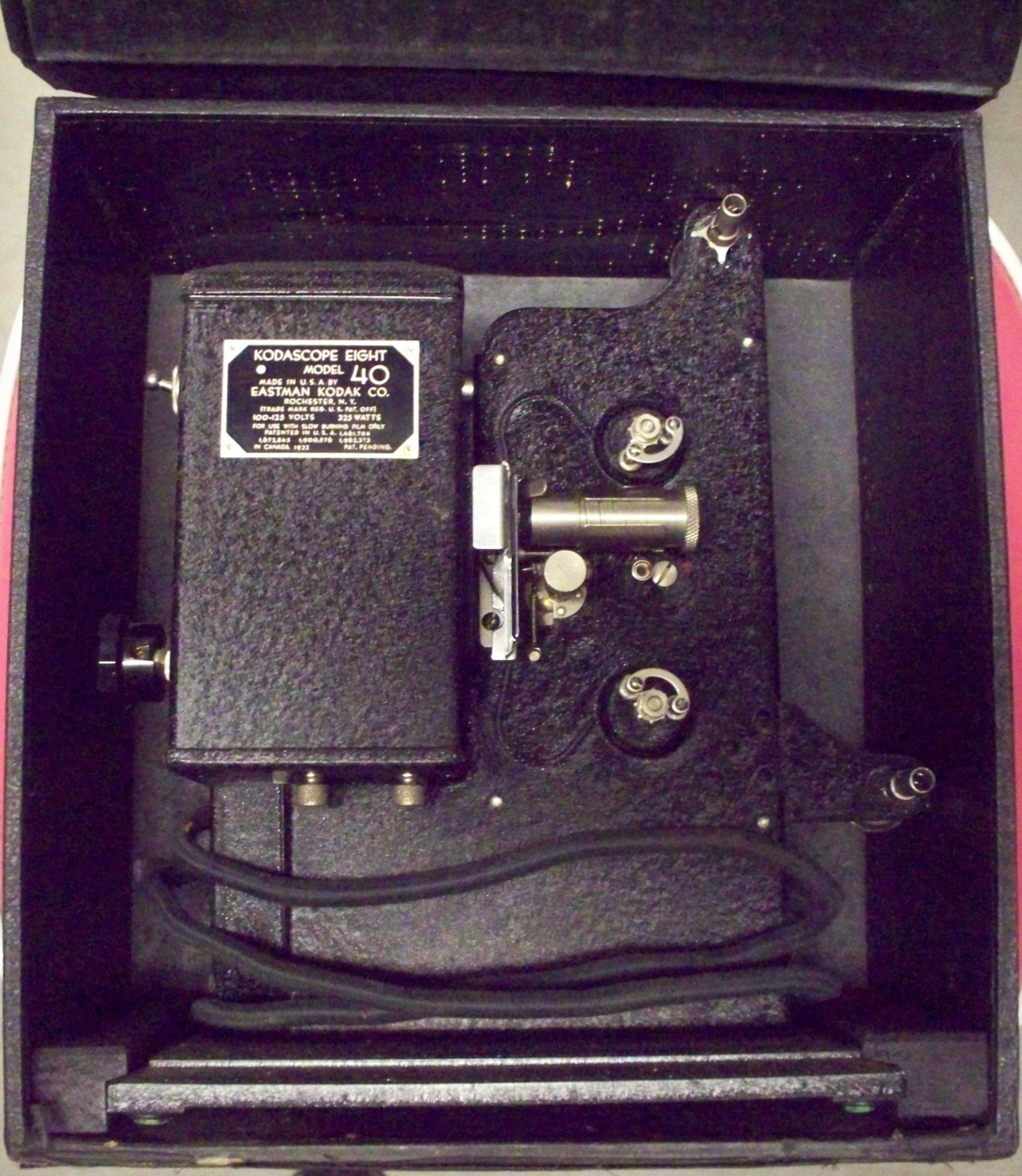
A Kodak Kodascope Eight Model 40 shown inside a Kodak carrying case. The case was made for models 20, 30 or 40.

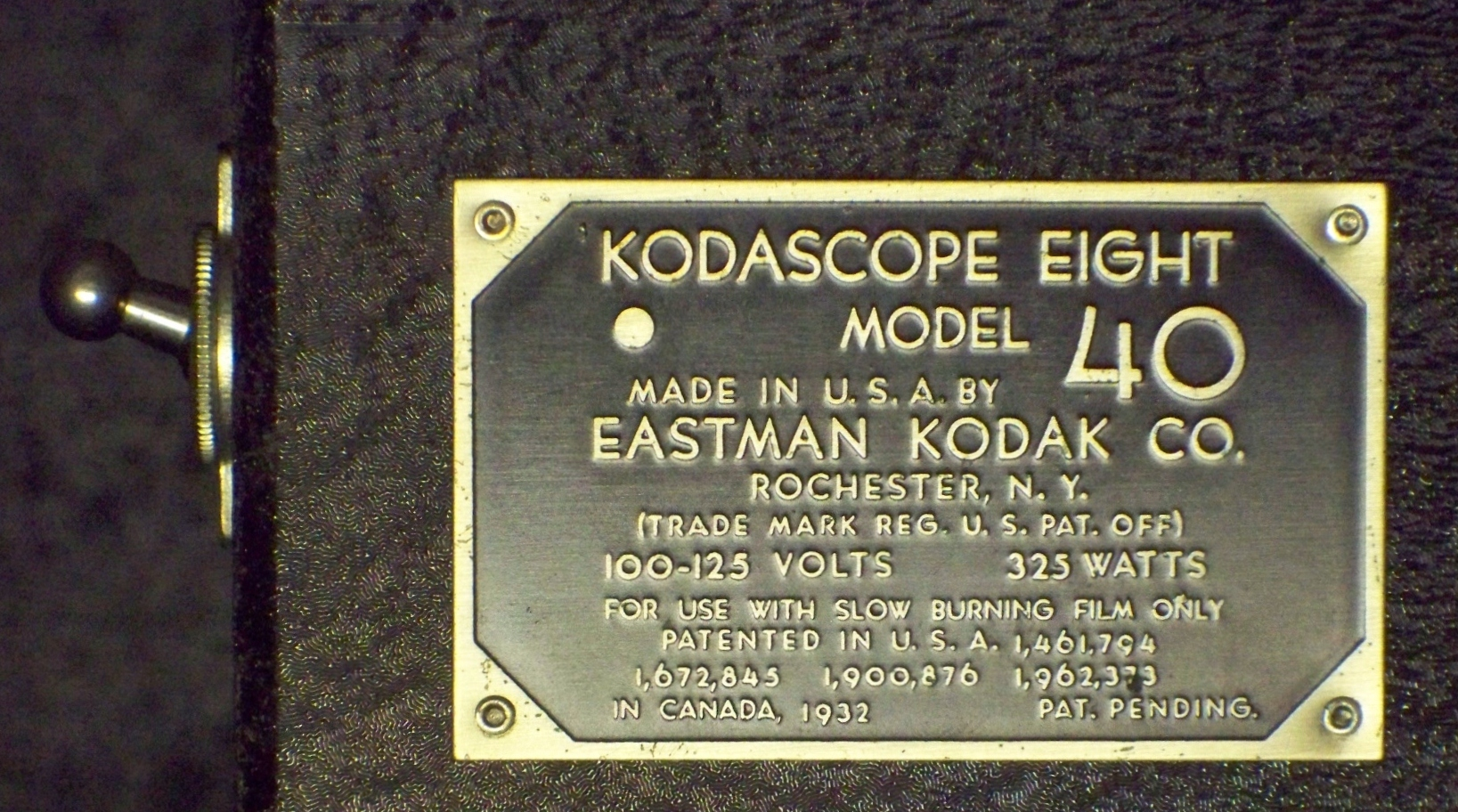
A Kodak Kodascope Eight Model 40 manufacturer plate.

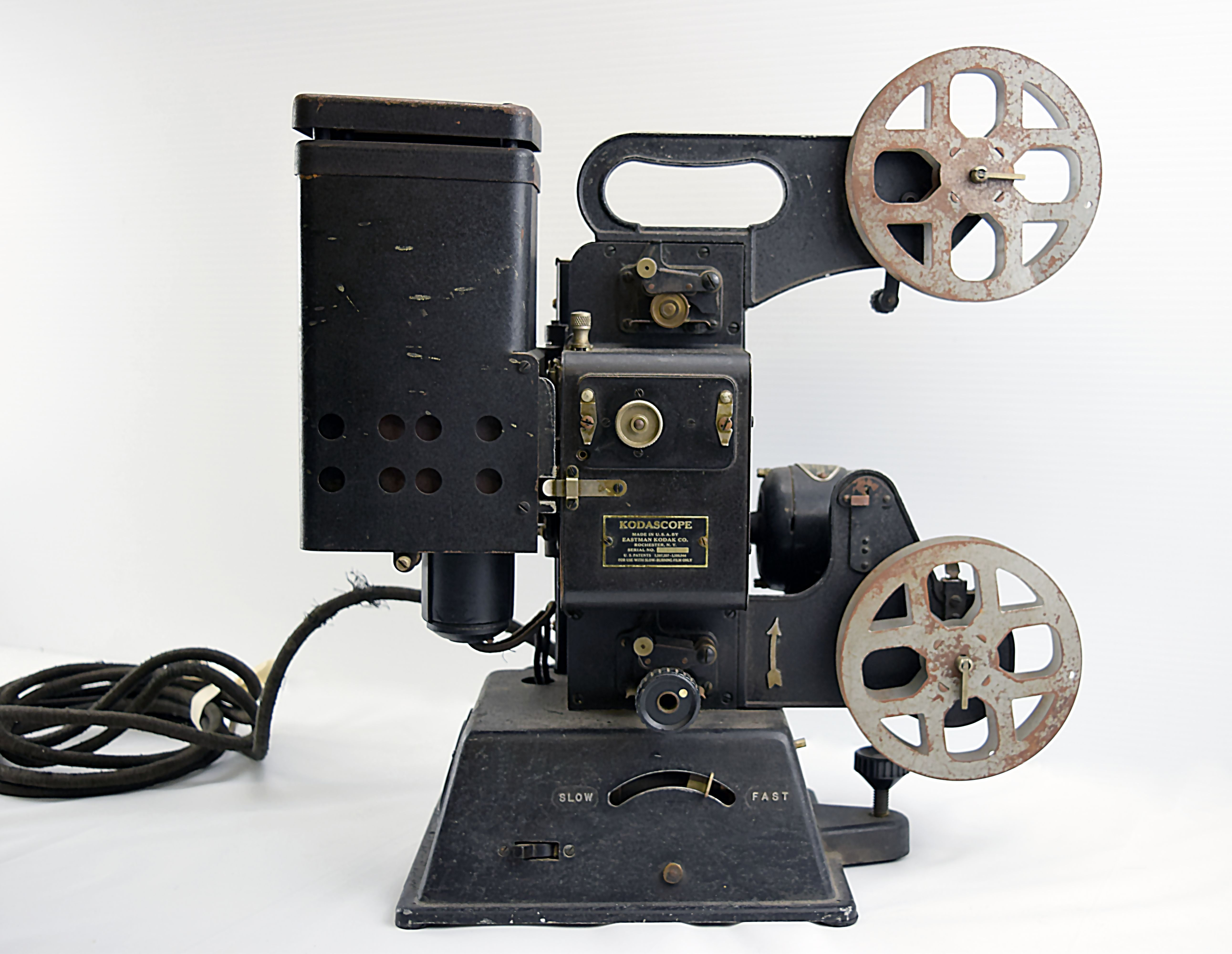
Kodascope model A, made in 1924.
