= Reduction print =

There are two different meanings for the term reduction print. In cinema it is a film print reduced in size, typically for showing in smaller cinemas. In printmaking it is a (rather uncommon) form of colour printing by working the same block (so "reducing" it) in a series of print runs, each just printing one colour.

== Cinema film ==
A reduction print is a print of a large-size format film converted to a smaller size format (for example, a 70mm print converted to 35mm). Often this is necessary because not all theatres have a screen of the size required to show a film in large format, or indeed the projection equipment. This is especially true of some screens in multiplex theatres. In former days, it was true of the neighbourhood theatres located outside of downtown areas.

Conversely, a "blow-up print" is a regular format film converted to larger size (i.e., 35mm to 70mm). This was once often done so that "regular-sized" film would seem even more impressive on screens such as the ones in Cinerama theatres.

== Relief printing ==
In woodcut and other forms of relief printing, a reduction print is a multicolour print in which the separate colours are printed from the same block at different stages. Usually, the lightest colour of the design is printed first, then the block is "reduced" by carving to the areas which the artist wants to print the second colour from, and so forth. The disadvantage of reduction printing as opposed to printing from multiple blocks is that once the first colour is printed, the matrix for it is destroyed in the creation of the printing matrix for the second colour. It is impossible to undo mistakes.
