= Discount theater =

Cinema that shows films at reduced prices

Discount theaters, also known as dollar theaters, dollar movies, second-run theaters, and sub-run theaters, are movie theaters that show motion pictures for reduced prices after those films depart first-run theaters. Originally, they would receive release prints of 35 mm films after those prints had been shown already at first-run theaters. Therefore, the film's quality was significantly lower because the release print was worn out from dozens of showings, and the potential audience for the film would be smaller since it had been already released weeks or months before, meaning that most people who wanted to see the film would already have done so at a first-run theater.

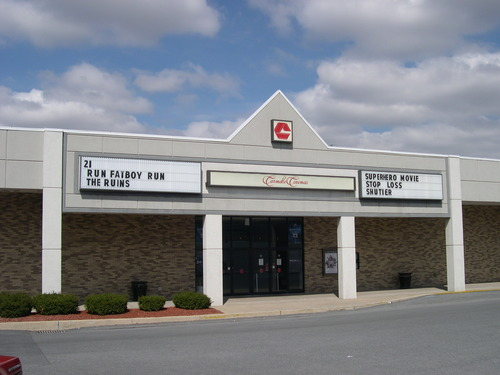
The Cinema 6 Theatre in State College, PA screens second-run film titles for $1 in 2008

Discount theaters were prevalent in the United States in the era before home video. They were able to remain financially viable for most of the VHS era, since the fuzzy images played back onto relatively small CRT televisions from videocassettes simply could not come close to the sharp resolution of images projected inside a movie theater from 35 mm film. Budget-conscious filmgoers with patience could simply wait for a film to hit a second-run theater, rather than pay much more to see the film during its first run. For example, six months after its original theatrical release, Titanic was playing in budget theaters in still viable but well-run prints.

Many discount theaters have been driven out of business by an oversupply of new movie screens (in the form of multiplexes), which has allowed films to stay longer in first-run theaters; a drastically shortened delay between theatrical and home video releases (culminating in simultaneous releases); and dramatic improvements in home video and television technology resulting in much sharper and larger images.

== See also ==
- Movie theater
- Neighborhood theatre
