= Neighborhood theatre =

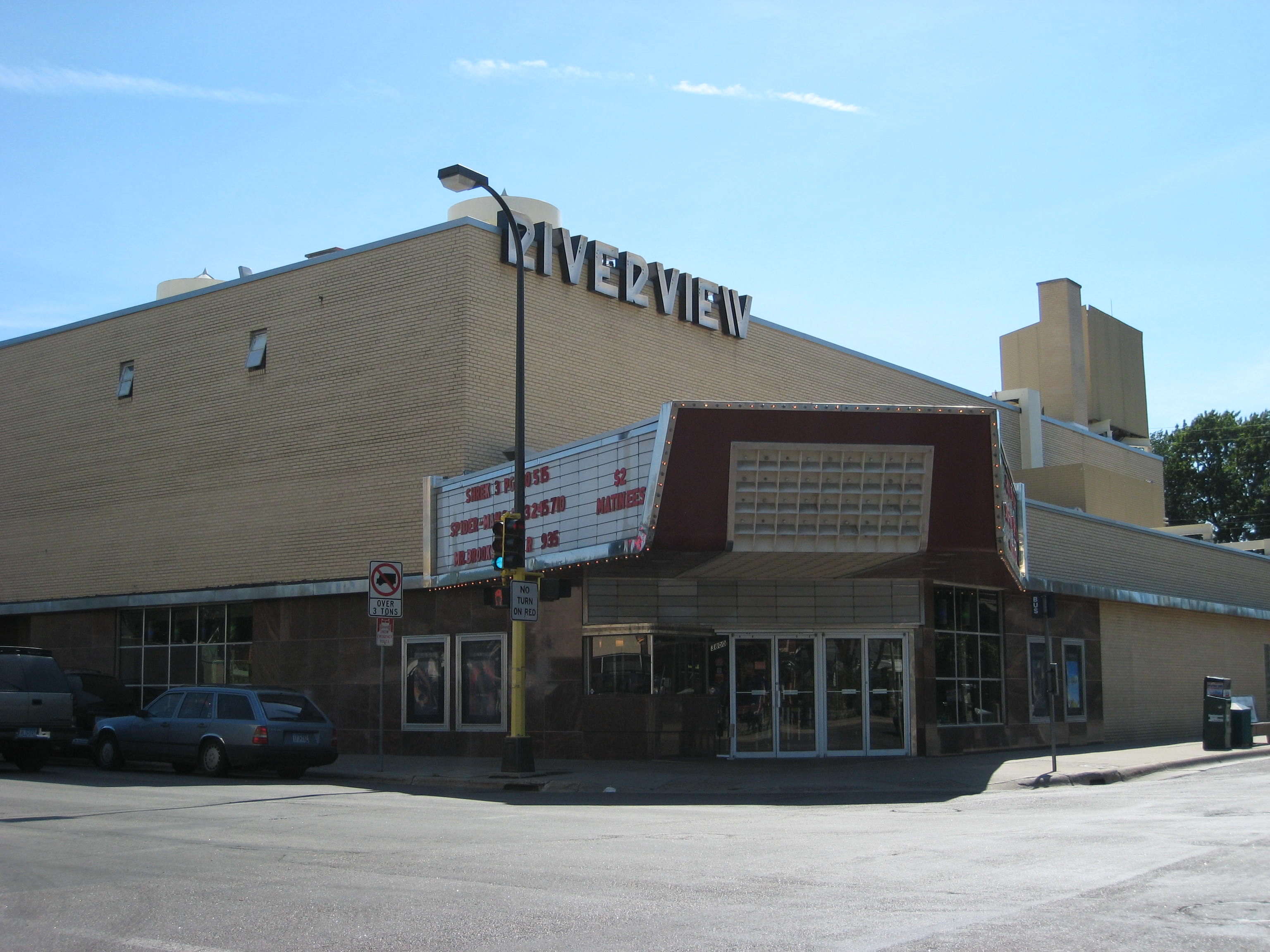
The Riverview Theater in Minneapolis's Howe neighborhood

Predating multiplex movie theatres, neighborhood theatres were the colloquial name given to smaller movie theatres located in local neighborhoods, as opposed to the large movie palaces located in downtown areas.

Neighborhood theatres were mostly discount theaters and typically showed films after their first run at cheaper prices, often double features. Because of their size, however, they would usually show reduction prints of films shot in such larger-sized formats such as Todd-AO, Super Panavision 70, or Ultra Panavision.

== See also ==
- Independent movie theater
