= Shooting ratio =

Ratio of total footage shot to footage used in a final cut

The shooting ratio in filmmaking and television production is the ratio between the total duration of the footage created for possible use in a project and the duration of the footage that appears in its final cut.

For example, a film with a shooting ratio of 2:1 would have had twice as much footage shot as appears in the finished film: 120 minutes of footage would have been shot to produce a film 60 minutes long.

== Typical ratios ==
Shooting ratios vary greatly between productions. A typical ratio for a production shot on film stock is between 6:1 and 10:1, whereas a similar production shot on video is likely to be much higher. This is generally attributed to the difference in cost between film stock, with its processing, and video tape.

The decisions, style and preferences of the filmmakers can strongly affect the ratio, and so does the nature of the production (genre, form, single-camera or multi-camera).

- Documentary films typically have the highest ratios, often exceeding 100:1 since the rise of video and digital media.
- Animated films typically have the lowest, close to 1:1, since creating footage frame by frame makes the time costs of animation very high compared to live action.

== What is counted ==
Footage that was never intended to appear in the finished project is generally not counted. Reference footage shot for animation (acting reference by animators, location reference, voice-actor performance reference), screen tests and audition footage are typically excluded for this reason. Documentary productions do not have similar exceptions, since a documentary may potentially use any footage shot at any point.

In live action, head slates, tail slates and outtakes are counted because they are recorded on the same reels and masters as the footage intended for the final picture. Animated and visual effects projects typically do not include slates in the shooting ratio, since slates are quick and inexpensive to create in digital formats.

== Digital production ==
With the spread of digital filmmaking, shooting ratios are less limited by the cost of raw stock and storage, as most productions are now entirely or partially digital. They are instead limited by the time, labor, money and storage involved in shooting and editing.

== See also ==
- Rough cut
- Picture lock
- Documentary film
- Film stock
