= Nitehawk Cinema =

Cinema in Brooklyn, New York

Coordinates: 40.715981°N 73.962563°W

- Industry: Entertainment (movie theater)
- Founded: June 24, 2011 (15 years ago)
- Headquarters: Brooklyn, New York City, New York, U.S.
- Number of locations: 2
- Key people: Matthew Viragh (Founder)
- Website: nitehawkcinema.com

Nitehawk Cinema is a dine-in independent movie theater in Brooklyn, New York City. It operates two locations, in the neighborhoods of Williamsburg and Park Slope. The theater, which offers a menu of food and drinks that can be ordered and consumed while patrons view films, was the first liquor licensed movie theater in the state of New York, and the first movie theater in New York City to offer table service.

== History ==
=== Nitehawk Williamsburg ===
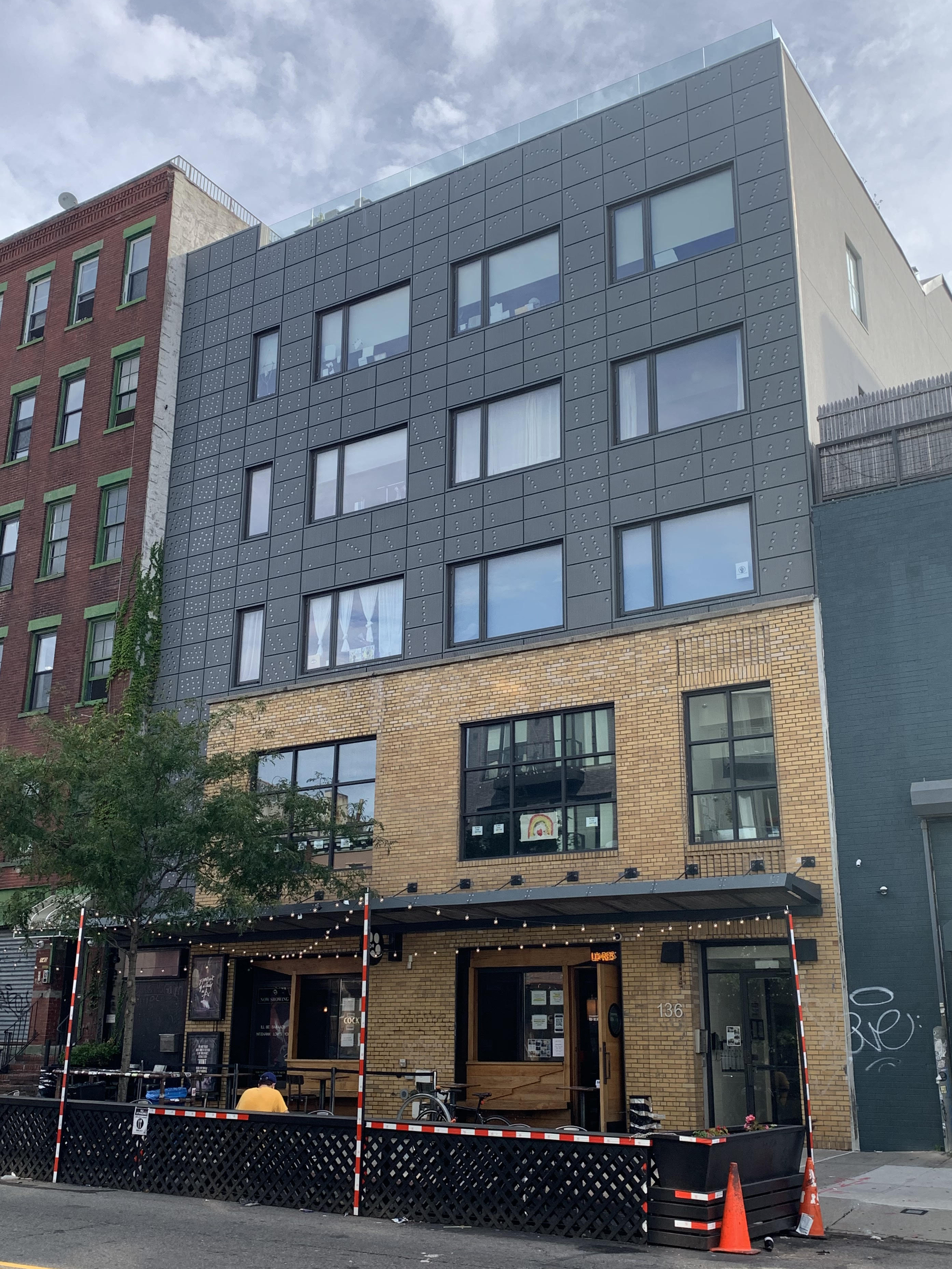
Nitehawk Williamsburg in Williamsburg, Brooklyn

Nitehawk was founded by Matthew Viragh. Viragh sought to establish a dine-in movie theater in New York City in 2008, after being a regular attendee at the Alamo Drafthouse Cinema while living in Austin, Texas, and later working at the Commodore Theatre in Portsmouth, Virginia, the first first-run movie theater in the United States to serve alcohol. At the time, New York state had a Prohibition-era law barring movie theaters from serving alcohol, prompting Viragh to hire a lawyer and a lobbyist to seek the law's repeal. Senate Bill S4772, which authorizes movie theaters in New York state to serve alcoholic beverages, passed the New York State Legislature by broad margins and was signed by Governor Andrew Cuomo on August 17, 2011.

Nitehawk opened its first location, a three-screen theater in Williamsburg, Brooklyn, on June 24, 2011. The theater was the first multi-screen theater in Northern Brooklyn following the closure of the Commodore Cinemas in Williamsburg in 2002. As its opening preceded the passage of Senate Bill S4772 and the modification of the theater's liquor license by several months, alcoholic beverages were initially only served in the front-of-house cafe and not during screenings. Nitehawk Williamsburg is housed in a former industrial building renovated by Caliper Architecture, and was retrofitted to also include a nine-unit apartment building and a custom façade made from LED lights, zinc, and glass. The theater's menu was developed by Michelin-starred chef Saul Bolton.

=== Nitehawk Prospect Park ===
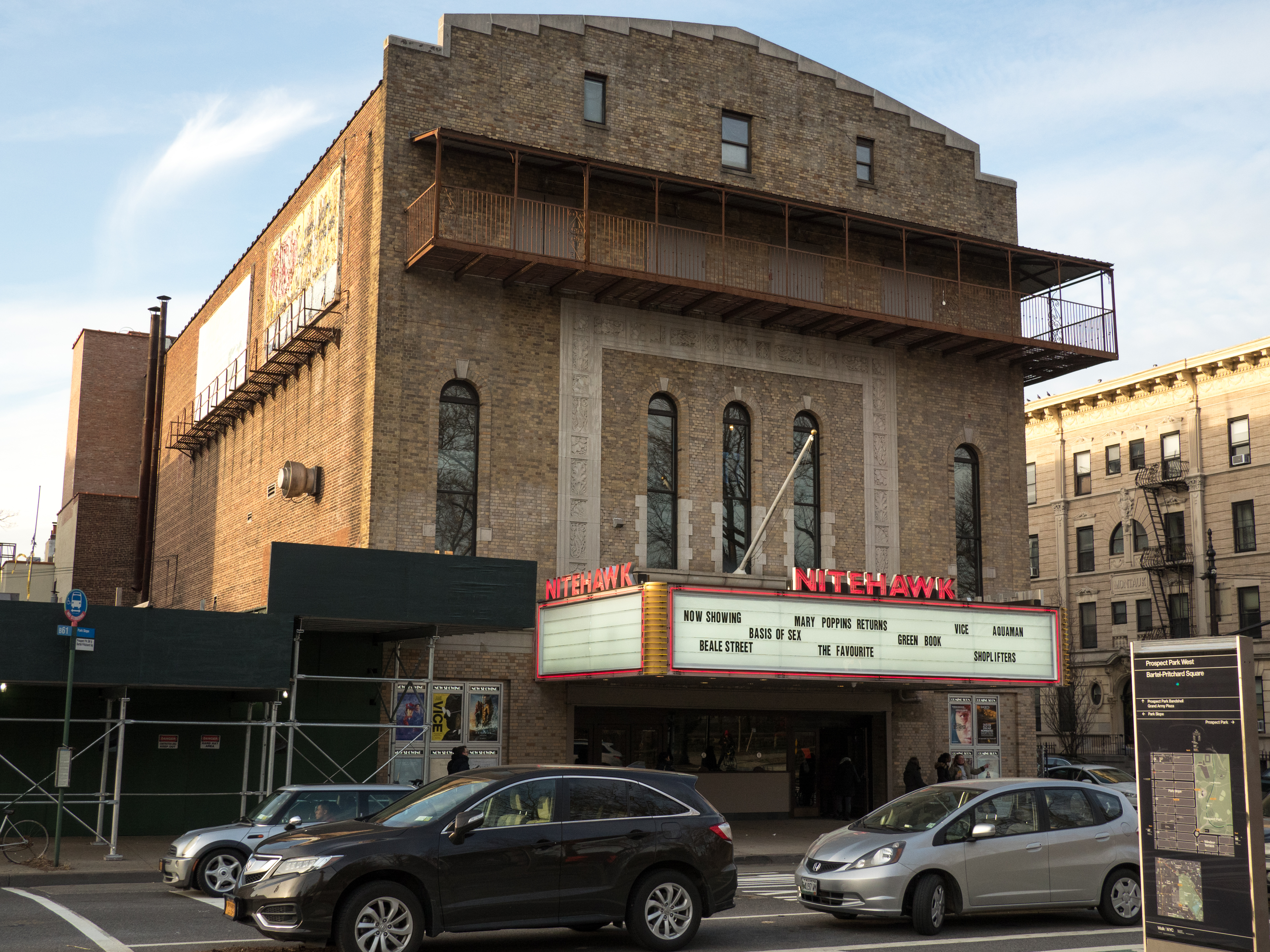
Nitehawk Prospect Park in Park Slope, Brooklyn

In September 2016, Nitehawk announced plans to open a second location, Nitehawk Prospect Park, in Park Slope. It is located in an historic Art Deco movie theater adjacent to Prospect Park that operated as the Sanders Theater from 1928 to 1978, and as the Pavilion Theater from 1996 to 2016. Viragh and the building's owner had discussed converting the theater into a Nitehawk in 2011, but discussions fell through following the opening of Nitehawk Williamsburg. In 2015, the New York City Landmarks Preservation Commission approved a plan that would have partially converted the building into condominiums and shrunk the floor area of the theater. However, an investment firm ultimately purchased the building for $28 million and granted a long-term lease to Nitehawk.

Nitehawk Prospect Park underwent renovations through 2016 and 2017, at a cost of "less than $10 million". Originally slated to open in fall 2017, renovation delays and the discovery of historic elements from the Sanders theater amid demolition led the opening to be postponed, and it ultimately reopened on December 19, 2018. The theater, which includes seven screens, 650 seats, two kitchens, and two bars, was designed by Think! Architecture and Design. The exterior of the building remained largely unchanged, except for the addition of a new marquee and an enlargement of its windows. In contrast to Nitehawk Williamsburg, Nitehawk Prospect Park screens a greater proportion of family and blockbuster films.

In March 2024, workers at Nitehawk Prospect Park voted to unionize with United Auto Workers (UAW) Local 2179. Worker organizing was supported by the Emergency Workplace Organizing Committee.

== Programming ==
Initially focused on screening first-run films, Nitehawk shifted focus to incorporate a range of first-run, classic, art house, and cult films. Nitehawk holds several regular series of special screenings and midnight movies, including "The Deuce" (exploitation films), "Film Feasts" (multi-course meals based on the film being screened), "Nitehawk Naughties" (erotic films), "Anime After Dark" (anime films screened in partnership with Anime NYC), and "A Nite To Dismember" (an all-night movie marathon held annually on Halloween). Since 2013, Nitehawk has held the Nitehawk Shorts Festival, an annual film festival focused on short films.

Nitehawk does not screen advertisements during its preshow, instead showing a montage of clips that are customized for each film; for instance, the preshow for Nitehawk's screenings of The Favourite included clips from Olivia Colman's comedic work and Yorgos Lanthimos' short films. In addition to its standard menu, Nitehawk offers a special menu for brunch screenings, and limited-time menu items inspired by the current slate of films it is screening.

== Reception ==
Nitehawk has been cited as an independent movie theater that has achieved financial success despite the industry's decline in ticket sales, which prompted several independent theaters to close down. The passing of Senate Bill S4772 is noted as having led a proliferation of liquor-licensed dine-in theaters in New York City, including Syndicated in Bushwick, the Metrograph on the Lower East Side, and an Alamo Drafthouse Cinema in Downtown Brooklyn, with The New York Times calling Nitehawk "the granddaddy of swizzle-stick cinema in the city".

== See also ==
- List of art cinemas in New York City
