= List of art cinemas in New York City =

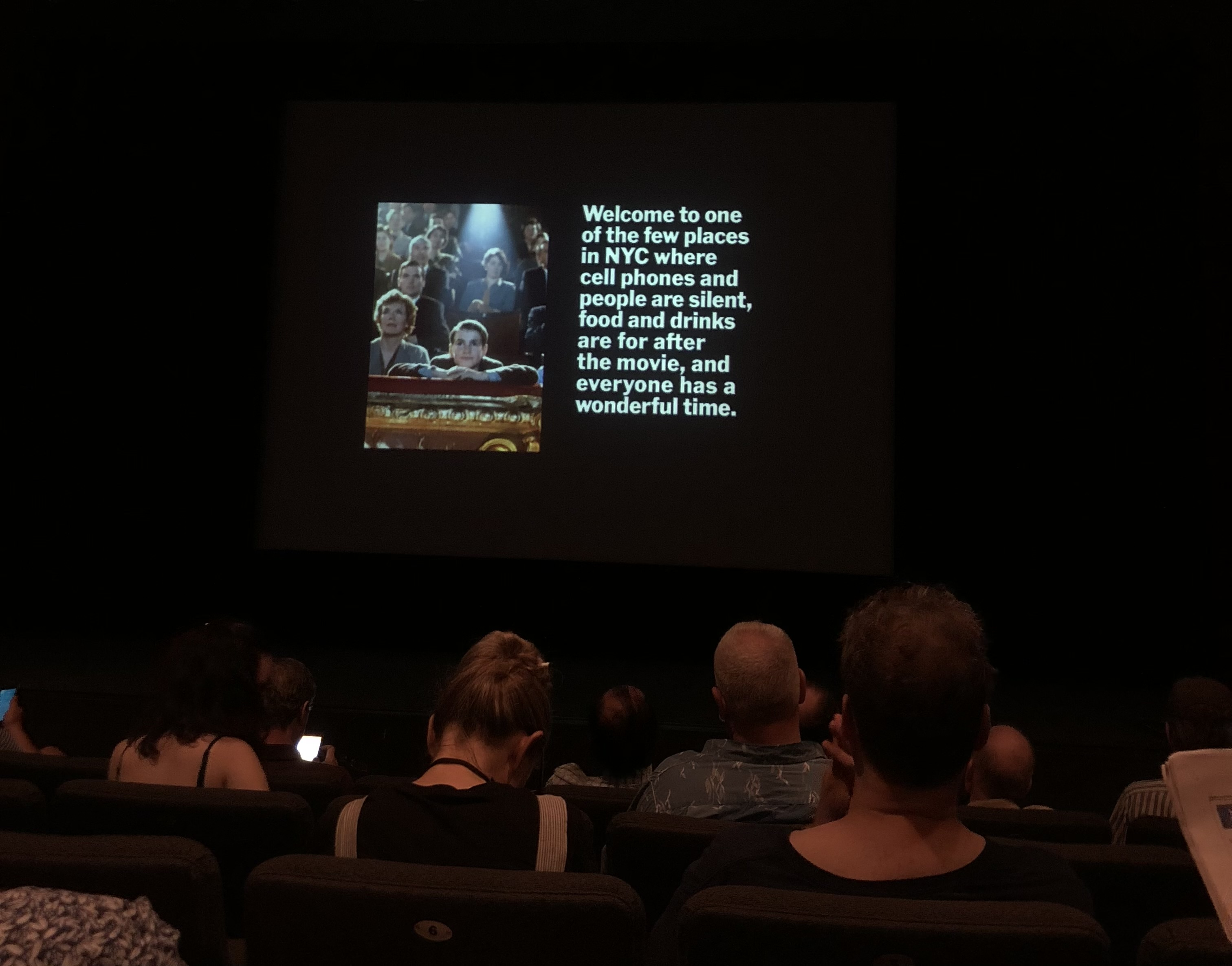
Interior of MoMA Film, the oldest continually operating art cinema in New York City

Art cinemas, or independent movie theaters, in New York City are known for showing art house, independent, revival, and foreign films.

== Manhattan ==
- Angelika Film Center
- Anthology Film Archives
- Cinema 1, 2 & 3 by Angelika
- Cinéma Village
- DCTV Cinema
- Film Forum
- Film Society of Lincoln Center
- The Film-Makers' Coop
- L'Alliance New York
- IFC Center
- Japan Society
- Maysles Documentary Center
- Metrograph
- Museum of Modern Art
- The Paris Theater, now leased by Netflix
- Quad Cinema
- Roxy Cinema
- Village East by Angelika

=== Former theaters ===
- 8th Street Playhouse
- Beekman Theatre
- Bleecker Street Cinema
- City Cinemas Beekman Theatre
- Fine Arts Theatre
- Lincoln Plaza Cinemas
- Landmark Sunshine Cinema
- Thalia Theatre
- Tribeca Cinemas
- Ziegfeld Theatre (1969)
- The Landmark at 57 West
- Theater 80 St Marks

== Brooklyn ==
- Cobble Hill Cinemas
- Nitehawk Williamsburg
- Nitehawk Prospect Park (formerly The Pavilion)
- BAM Rose Cinemas
- Syndicated Bar Theater Kitchen
- Spectacle Theater
- Light Industry
- Stuart Cinema & Cafe
- e-flux Screening Room

=== Former theaters ===
- reRun Gastropub Theater
- indieScreen
- Videology Bar & Cinema

== Queens ==
- Kew Gardens Cinemas
- Low Cinema
- Museum of the Moving Image

== See also ==
- List of theaters in New York
- Culture of New York City
