= Paris Theater (Manhattan) =

Single-screen movie theater in New York City

The Paris Theater
- Fine Arts Theatre
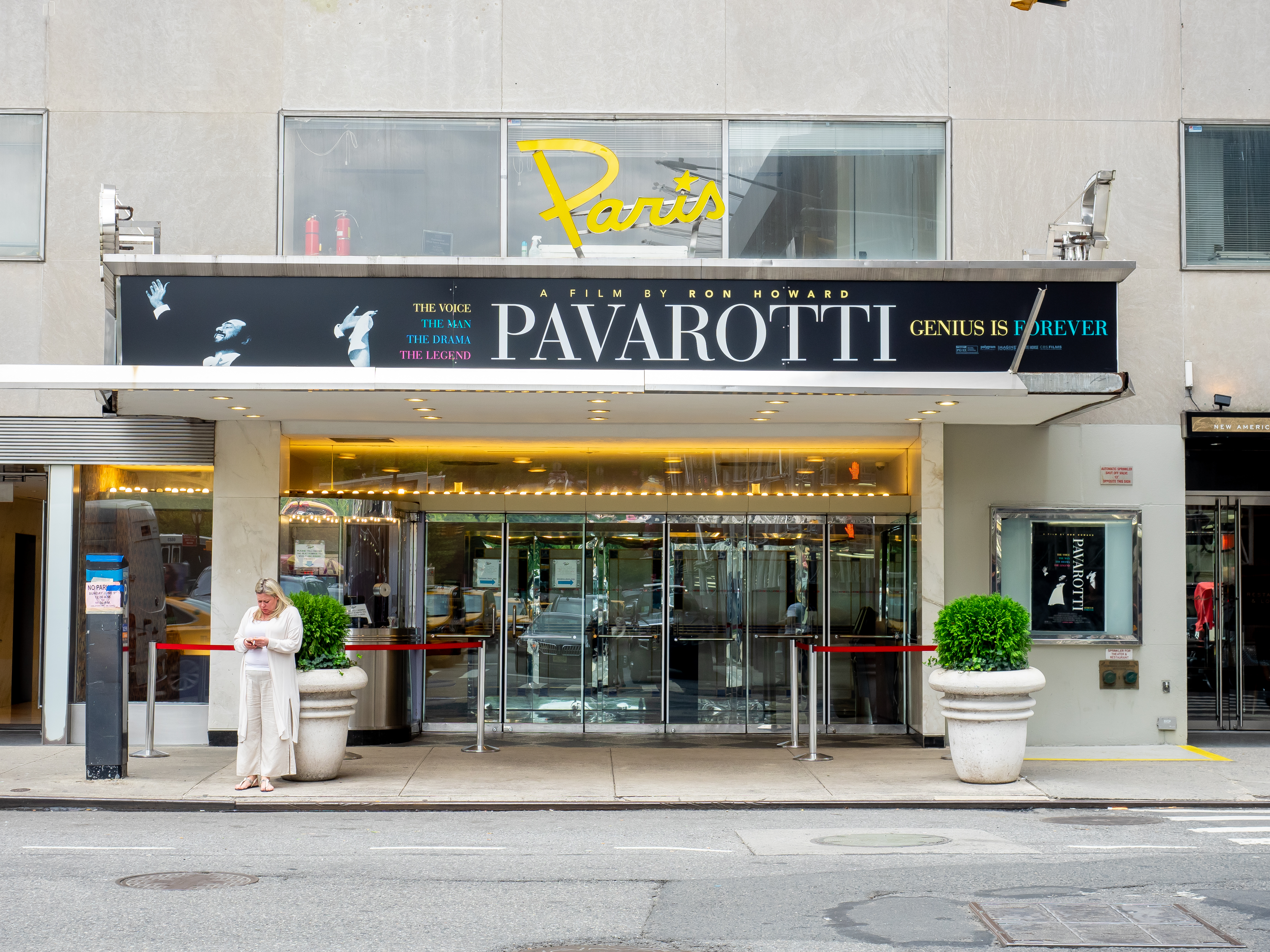
- Exterior of theater (2019)
- Interactive map of The Paris Theater
- Address: 4 West 58th Street; Manhattan, New York City; United States
- Coordinates: 40.7638°N 73.9743°W
- Owner: Stefan Soloviev
- Operator: Netflix (as of 2019)
- Capacity: 535
- Type: Single-screen movie theater

Construction
- Opened: September 13, 1948
- Closed: August 2019
- Reopened: November 6, 2019

Website
- www.paristheaternyc.com

The Paris Theater is a 535-seat single-screen art house movie theater, located in Manhattan in New York City. It opened on September 13, 1948. It often showed art films and foreign films in their original languages. Upon the 2016 closure of the Ziegfeld, the Paris became Manhattan's sole-surviving single-screen cinema. Since November 2019, it has been operated by Netflix, playing first-run releases alongside repertory programming.

== History ==
The theater was opened by Pathé Cinema on September 13, 1948, when actress Marlene Dietrich cut the inaugural ribbon in the presence of the U.S. Ambassador to France.

It was designed by the New York architectural firm of Emery Roth & Sons. It was one of the first designs produced by Richard Roth when he reorganized the firm after returning from duty in the Pacific during World War II. He later co-designed the Pan Am Building and the World Trade Center.

Located at 4 West 58th Street in Midtown Manhattan, it has specialized in foreign (especially French language) and independent films. It is between the Solow Building and Bergdorf Goodman Building, across from the Plaza Hotel. The theater became a destination for motion pictures by directors including Federico Fellini and Franco Zeffirelli.

In 1990, Pathé lost its lease. Loews Theatres then took over the operation and it was known as the Fine Arts Theatre for a while. In 1994 the space was purchased by Sheldon Solow, a New York City–based real-estate developer and owner.

By 2009, City Cinemas was the theater's operator. After the Ziegfeld closed in January 2016, the Paris became Manhattan's sole surviving single-screen cinema. In August 2019, a notice of closure was posted. In November 2019, it was announced that the cinema would reopen for a limited run of Noah Baumbach's Marriage Story (2019). At that time, Netflix leased the Paris Theater to use it for Netflix-original movie debuts, special events and other screenings. The Paris closed temporarily in 2020 during the COVID-19 pandemic, reopening in August 2021. During the closure, Netflix installed new seating and made other improvements to the facility, which reopened August 6, 2021.

== See also ==
- 1948 in architecture
- List of art cinemas in New York City
