= IFC Center =

Movie theater in Manhattan, New York

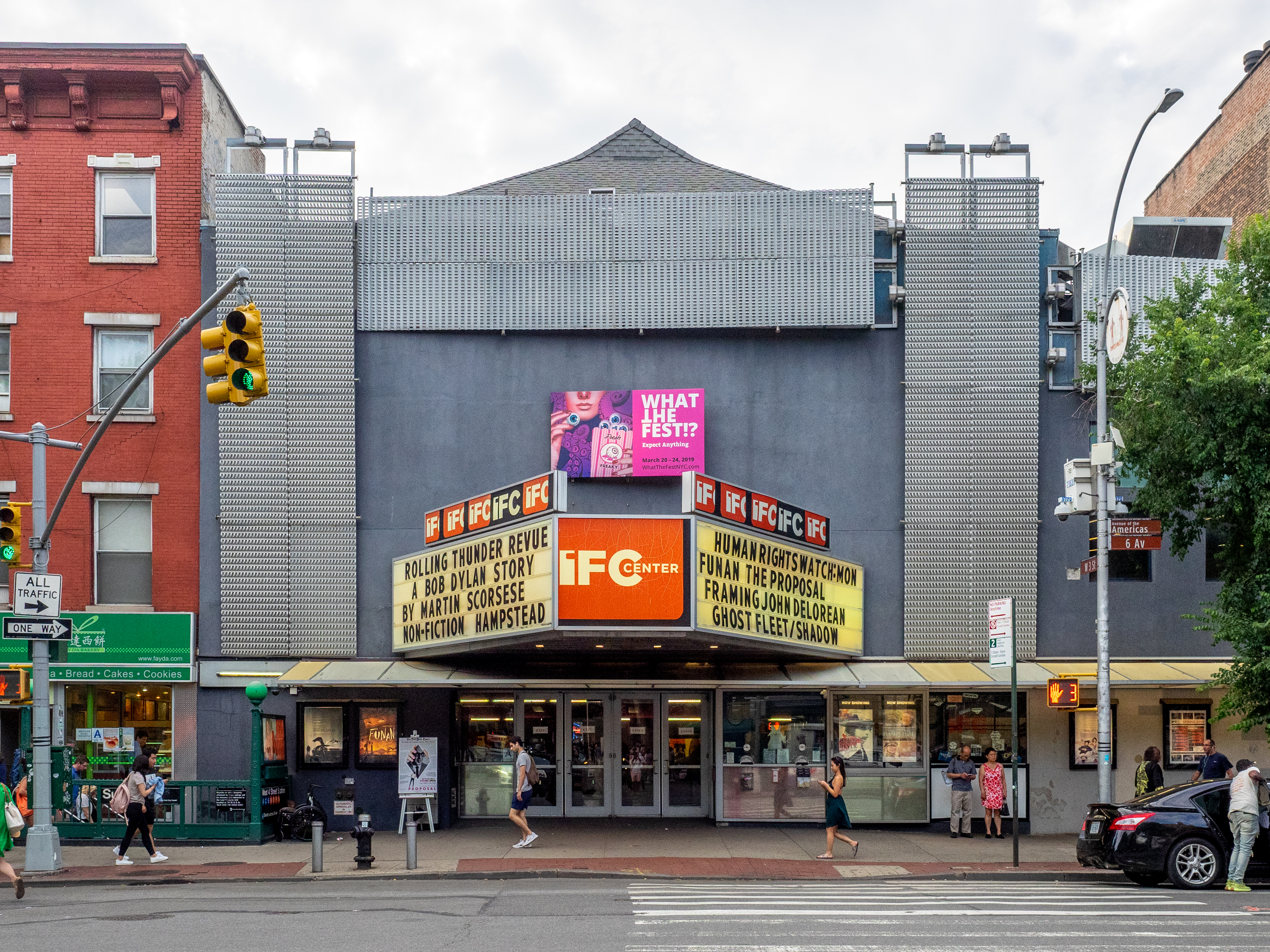
- Interactive map of the IFC Center area

General information
- Type: Cinema
- Location: 323 Sixth Avenue, New York City, United States
- Opened: June 17, 2005; 21 years ago
- Owner: AMC Global Media

Other information
- Public transit: West Fourth Street–Washington Square station

Website
- www.ifccenter.com

IFC Center is an art house movie theater in Greenwich Village, Manhattan, New York City. Located at 323 Sixth Avenue (Avenue of the Americas) at West 3rd Street, it was formerly the Waverly Theater, an art house movie theater. IFC Center is owned by AMC Global Media (known until July 1, 2011, as Rainbow Media), the entertainment company that owns the cable channels AMC, BBC America, IFC, We TV and Sundance TV and the offshoot film company IFC Films.

== Description and history ==
AMC Networks has positioned the theater as an extension of its cable channel IFC (Independent Film Channel) because IFC was to take over the building. IFC has converted the historic building, originally built as a church in the early 19th century, into a three-, and eventually five-theater facility. The theater is equipped to screen 35mm and high-definition digital video. The complex originally included digital editing suites, a meeting area, and a restaurant called The Waverly, in recognition of the site's past, but those spaces have since been converted. (The Waverly restaurant was closed and renovated into two additional screens, bringing the theater's total screen count to five in 2009.) In addition to regularly scheduled films, the Center plays host to special screenings such as premieres, educational programs and film festival screenings.

IFC Center opened on June 17, 2005, with the film Me and You and Everyone We Know, distributed by IFC Films. The opening was not without controversy; for the first several weeks, patrons were welcomed to the theater by a picket line and a giant inflatable rat. The center had opened employing only non-union projectionists prompting a protest from the IATSE local 306.

It is DOC NYC's principal location, and has hosted screenings for the Human Rights Watch Film Festival.

IFC's weekly series, formerly titled "At The Angelika" (filmed at the nearby Angelika Theater) relocated to IFC Center and thus the show was retitled "At The IFC". The show ran through the mid-2000s.

== In popular culture ==
The Waverly Theatre is referenced numerous times in the 1968 Broadway musical Hair, including the song "Frank Mills" sung by the character Crissy at the end of Act One.

The Waverly was also known as the original home of the midnight audience-participation screenings of the movie version of The Rocky Horror Picture Show, which ran there for many years, spawning similar showings in other cities.

Back to the Well, the making-of documentary for Clerks II, has a scene filmed at the IFC Center, where a test screening is held for Clerks II with Bob Weinstein in attendance.

== See also ==
- Culture of New York City
- List of art cinemas in New York City
- List of theaters in New York
