= The Metrograph =

Film magazine

- Categories: Film
- Frequency: Biannually
- First issue: December 10, 2024
- Company: Metrograph
- Country: United States
- Based in: New York City, New York, United States
- Language: English
- Website: metrograph.com/magazine/
- ISSN: 3065-2774

The Metrograph, also known as the Metrograph Magazine, is a biannual print publication centered around film. It was started by the Metrograph, an arthouse theater in Manhattan.

Air Mail recommended The Metrograph both as a Read and a Gift.

== History ==
The Metrograph announced on November 1, 2024 that it would be releasing a biannual print publication, with preorders open right away.

The first issue of The Metrograph was then released on December 10, 2024, featuring an interviews with Clint Eastwood and Ari Aster, essays about Maggie Cheung, Ann Hui, and others, and pieces from writers like Yiyun Li. On that day, the Metrograph held a release party in its venue—filmmakers like Paul Schrader and Onur Tukel attended.
