= Fantastic Four (2015 film) =

Superhero film by Josh Trank

- Theatrical release poster
- Directed by: Josh Trank
- Screenplay by: Jeremy Slater; Simon Kinberg; Josh Trank
- Based on: Fantastic Four by: Stan Lee; Jack Kirby
- Produced by: Matthew Vaughn; Simon Kinberg; Gregory Goodman; Hutch Parker; Robert Kulzer
- Starring: Miles Teller; Michael B. Jordan; Kate Mara; Jamie Bell; Toby Kebbell; Reg E. Cathey; Tim Blake Nelson; Tim Heidecker
- Cinematography: Matthew Jensen
- Edited by: Elliot Greenberg; Stephen Rivkin
- Music by: Marco Beltrami; Philip Glass
- Production companies: 20th Century Fox; Constantin Film; Marvel Entertainment; Marv Films; Kinberg Genre; Moving Picture Company
- Distributed by: 20th Century Fox (Worldwide); Constantin Film (Germany)
- Release dates: August 4, 2015 (New York City); August 7, 2015 (United States)
- Running time: 100 minutes
- Countries: United States; United Kingdom
- Language: English
- Budget: $120 million
- Box office: $168 million

Fantastic Four (stylized as Fant4stic in all caps) is a 2015 superhero film based on the Marvel Comics superhero team and the first reboot of the Fantastic Four film series since Rise of the Silver Surfer (2007). Directed by Josh Trank and written by Trank, Jeremy Slater, and Simon Kinberg, it stars Miles Teller, Michael B. Jordan, Kate Mara, Jamie Bell, Toby Kebbell, Reg E. Cathey, Tim Blake Nelson, and Tim Heidecker. The film follows a group of intelligent teenagers who build a transdimensional portal, causing them to acquire superhuman abilities.

Development of the film began in August 2009. Trank was hired to direct in July 2012 and the principal characters were cast in January 2014. Principal photography began in May 2014 in Baton Rouge, Louisiana and lasted for two months. Unsatisfied with Trank's original cut, 20th Century Fox executives mandated reshoots, which took place in January 2015.

Fantastic Four premiered at Williamsburg Cinemas in New York City on August 4, 2015, and was released on August 7 in the United States by 20th Century Fox. The film received negative reviews from critics and was a box-office failure, grossing $168 million worldwide against a production budget of $120 million, with an estimated loss of $80–$100 million for the studio. Fantastic Four received several Golden Raspberry Awards, including Worst Director and Worst Picture. Trank voiced his displeasure with the final film, which he attributed to the studio's interference.

A sequel scheduled for release in 2017 was canceled after the original film's failure. It was the last Fantastic Four film to be distributed by 20th Century Fox, which was acquired by Disney in 2019 and the film rights were reverted to Marvel as a result. Another reboot, The Fantastic Four: First Steps, was released on July 25, 2025, as the first film in Phase Six of the Marvel Cinematic Universe.

== Plot ==
Childhood friends Reed Richards and Ben Grimm have worked together on a prototype teleporter for seven years, eventually attracting the attention of Professor Franklin Storm, director of the Baxter Foundation, a government-sponsored research institute for young prodigies. Reed is recruited to join them and aid Storm's children, scientist Sue Storm and her brother engineer Johnny Storm. While the board doubts the reliability of Storm's protégé Victor Von Doom, the originator of the "Quantum Gate", Victor goes with it because of the presence of Sue.

The experiment is successful, and the facility's supervisor, Dr. Allen, plans to send a group from NASA to venture into a parallel dimension known as "Planet Zero". Disappointed at being denied the chance to join the expedition, Reed, Johnny and Victor along with Ben use the Quantum Gate to embark on an unsanctioned voyage to Planet Zero, which they learn is a world filled with otherworldly substances. Victor attempts to touch the green lava-like substance, causing the ground they are standing on to erupt. Reed, Johnny and Ben return to their shuttle just as Sue brings them back to Earth and Victor is seemingly killed after he falls into the collapsing landscape. The Quantum Gate explodes, altering Reed, Sue, Johnny and Ben on a genetic level and granting them superhuman abilities beyond their control: Reed can stretch like rubber, Sue can become invisible and generate force fields, Johnny can engulf his entire body in fire and fly, and Ben acquires a rock-like hide which gives him superhuman strength and durability. They are then placed in government custody to be studied and have their abilities tested. Blaming himself for the accident, Reed escapes from the facility and tries to find a cure for their changes.

One year later in 2015, Reed is now a fugitive and has built a suit that helps him control his ability. Hiding in Central America, he is eventually found by the United States military with Sue's help and captured by Ben, who has become a military asset along with Johnny and Sue. Johnny and Sue have been outfitted with specialized suits designed to help them control their abilities. Reed is brought to Area 57, where Dr. Allen conscripts him into rebuilding the Quantum Gate in exchange for giving Reed the resources to find a cure. Arriving in Planet Zero, Dr. Allen's explorers find Victor, who has been fused to his spacesuit and now possesses telekinetic abilities, and bring him back to Earth; however, he is no longer the Victor they know. Believing that Earth needs to be destroyed to protect his new home world from future invasions, Victor kills the scientists and soldiers in the base, including Dr. Allen and Professor Storm, and returns to Planet Zero using the Quantum Gate, with Ben, Johnny, Reed and Sue in pursuit.

Now dubbing himself "Doom", Victor activates a portal on Planet Zero using the Quantum Gate and begins consuming the landscape of the Earth using a structure he created from the rock formations in Planet Zero. He is confronted by the four and, after a short battle, Ben punches Doom into the portal's energy beam, disintegrating him while Johnny closes the portal. Returning to Earth, the group is rewarded by the US military for their heroics by being given a new base of operations known as "Central City" to study their abilities without government interference. They decide to use their powers to help people and adopt the mantle of the "Fantastic Four".

== Cast ==
- Miles Teller as Reed Richards / Mister Fantastic:
  Richards has been exploring the universe in his garage after school. He gains the ability to stretch his body into different forms and lengths. Teller said of the role, "When I read the script, I didn't feel like I was reading this larger-than-life, incredible superhero tale. These are all very human people that end up having to become, I guess, what is known as the Fantastic Four. So for me it was just a really good story and gives me an opportunity to play something different from my own skin." Owen Judge portrays Reed as a child while Fernando Rivera portrays Reed in disguise.
- Michael B. Jordan as Johnny Storm / Human Torch:
  A troublemaker, thrill-seeker and the younger brother of adopted sister Sue Storm, he has the ability to shoot fireballs and fly. Jordan said of the cast, "We're more or less a bunch of kids that had an accident and we have disabilities now that we have to cope with, and try to find a life afterwards – try to be as normal as we can." Jordan previously worked with Trank on 2012's Chronicle, and according to Trank, Jordan's character in Chronicle shares characteristics with Johnny Storm. Trank has described Storm as "smart, hilarious and charismatic."
- Kate Mara as Sue Storm / Invisible Woman:
  Brilliant, independent, and sarcastic, Storm has the ability to become invisible and generate force-fields. Mara has said that she intended to focus on making her character "as real as possible". Trank described Storm as "smart, dignified and [with] integrity."
- Jamie Bell as Ben Grimm / The Thing:
  Warm, sensitive, a loyal and protective friend, Grimm's stone body gives him super-strength and makes him "indestructible". Trank said Grimm grew up an alienated child in a "tough" neighborhood. Trank also said that Bell has "qualities" of warmth and strength which people would want to see from Grimm. Bell has said that Grimm is the "heart of the group [Fantastic Four]". In preparation for the motion-capture performance, Bell approached actor Andy Serkis for advice. During filming, he wore a tracking suit and stilts to match the height and eye-line of The Thing. Evan Hannemann portrays Grimm as a child.
- Toby Kebbell as Victor Von Doom / Dr. Doom:
  A computer technician and computer scientist who is mentored by Dr. Franklin Storm. Doom finds a new father of sorts in Storm. Angry, vengeful, and bright, Doom was changed in the Negative Zone, as were the other characters. Kebbell said that he concentrated the most on the voice of the character, adding, "on the animated series, they never got his voice what I imagined it to be when I read the comics as a little boy. What I spent the majority of my time doing was not just being a fan, but being a bit of pedant and making sure I got exactly what I always wanted to see." Kinberg said that Doom is as central to the film as the "titular" heroes. He added that Doom has "aspirations and struggles that are a little bit more classically tragic than the other characters" and that the film would show how he becomes a villain. Dr. Doom's full name in this film was originally going to be "Victor Domashev", but after backlash by fans, it was changed back to "Victor Von Doom" during reshoots, to match his name in the Marvel Comics universe.
- Reg E. Cathey as Dr. Franklin Storm:
  The biological father of Johnny and adoptive father to Sue. Cathey described Franklin as a "brilliant scientist who has achieved much more than he thought he would" and that Franklin's main drive in life is to help "brilliant" kids who may have been dropped through the cracks or who were misunderstood.
- Tim Blake Nelson as Dr. Harvey Allen:
  A scientist who works for the government and takes part in training the members of the team to hone their abilities. Nelson said that Allen is "responsible for what the creative people do that he has to rein them in and discipline them."
- Tim Heidecker as Mr. Richards:
  Reed's stepfather.
- Dan Castellaneta as Mr. Kenny:
  Reed's teacher.
- Wayne Pere as Science Fair Judge.
- Chet Hanks as Jimmy Grimm:
  Ben's older brother.
- Mary-Pat Green as Elsie Grimm:
  Ben and Jimmy's mother and the presumed owner of Grimm Salvage.

== Production ==
=== Development ===
This Fantastic Four movie is sort of a celebration of all the Fantastic Four comics that have preceded it. We have elements from the original Fantastic Four that there's a sort of optimism and inspirational quality to the film. In some ways a comedy that was really distinct in the original Fantastic Four. Also, the notion of this dysfunctional surrogate family that comes together and has to work together is very present in the movie that owes a great debt to the originals and this idea that they are scientists and that it's almost like this science adventure, more than being superheroes... We also owe a lot to the Ultimate's [sic] and the current crop of Fantastic Four comics.

— Simon Kinberg on adapting the Fantastic Four comic books into film

In August 2009, 20th Century Fox announced that they would reboot the Fantastic Four film franchise, with Akiva Goldsman hired as producer, and Michael Green to write the screenplay. At the time, actors Adrien Brody and Jonathan Rhys Meyers were considered for the role of Mr. Fantastic, and Kiefer Sutherland the role of The Thing. In July 2012, Josh Trank was hired to direct coming off the success of his debut feature Chronicle, with Jeremy Slater attached to write the script. While Trank was being considered as director, X-Men: First Class writers Zack Stentz and Ashley Edward Miller were assigned to work on the script. After Trank officially signed on, he decided to write his own script instead. Slater's original script featured the villains Galactus and Dr. Doom with Doom depicted as a spy who becomes a herald of Galactus, and eventually the dictator of Latveria. Slater wanted Galactus to be the film's main villain, but his role was scaled down to then appear in one scene and later in the post-credits scene.

Trank and Slater's ideas for the film were tonally opposite, with Slater revealing that he viewed 2012's The Avengers as a template, but Trank disliked all of his ideas. Despite claiming to have been a fan of the Fantastic Four "when [he] was a kid", Trank had only seen the 1994 cartoon series and had no interest in the superhero movie genre. He stated that he found himself unable to identify with Slater's more comic book-centric tone. Trank left Slater out of discussions with Fox Studios and withheld certain studio notes. Slater added "I never saw 95% of those notes" and left after six months. Deeming the titular team as "so malleable" due to how flexible their stories can be whenever they are reimagined unlike other super heroes, Slater had inspired himself on the comic books runs by Mark Waid and John Byrne, giving Waid's second collection about Doom diving into sorcery with Mike Wieringo's art due to dealing with horror and science fiction to Trank. While Slater liked the tone of The Avengers, Trank preferred the tone of 2005's Batman Begins. In addition, they did not have the same budget to make a film as big as that Marvel Studios production. In February 2013, Matthew Vaughn was attached to produce, and Seth Grahame-Smith hired to polish the script. In October 2013, Simon Kinberg was hired as co-writer and producer. In April 2014, the Cavalry FX was hired for the film's previsualization. Slater was very confident that the film was going to be the "next Dark Knight trilogy", which had previously rebooted the Batman franchise to critical acclaim.

According to Mark Millar, 20th Century Fox's consultant for their Marvel Comics–based films, the film would take place in the same universe as the X-Men film series. Although Kinberg contradicted this statement, Bryan Singer confirmed talks of a potential crossover among Fox. Trank has said that the film is heavily influenced by David Cronenberg, that 1981's Scanners and 1986's The Fly influenced the look of the film, and that its overall tone would feel like a "cross between Steven Spielberg and Tim Burton".

=== Casting ===
In January 2014, Kinberg finished rewriting the script, and casting for the roles of Reed Richards and Susan Storm began. Miles Teller, Kit Harington, Richard Madden, and Jack O'Connell were tested for the role of Reed, before Teller was cast. Meanwhile, Kate Mara, Saoirse Ronan, Margot Robbie, and Emmy Rossum were tested for Susan. In February, it was revealed that Michael B. Jordan would play Johnny Storm / Human Torch, and Mara was cast as Susan Storm / Invisible Woman. In March, Toby Kebbell was cast as Victor von Doom, and Teller confirmed that Jamie Bell had been cast as Ben Grimm / The Thing. Sam Riley, Eddie Redmayne, and Domhnall Gleeson were considered for Doctor Doom. Mads Mikkelsen also auditioned for the role of Doom; Mikkelsen later stated that the only thing he was asked to do during his audition was stretch his arms as long as he could make them. In April, Tim Blake Nelson entered final negotiations to play Harvey Elder. In May, Reg E. Cathey was cast as Susan and Johnny's father, Dr. Storm.

The casting of a Black actor, Michael B. Jordan, as Johnny Storm spawned controversy among some fans. Director Josh Trank justified his decision by saying the move to cast Jordan as Johnny Storm was taken to bring the iconic comic book team in line with real-world demographics. Trank would receive numerous death threats through IMDb message boards over the casting decision and slept with a .38 Special on his nightstand as an act of self-defense in case someone broke into his house to attack him. He returned the gun after production had wrapped. He later said that he wanted to cast a Black actress for the role of Susan Storm, but that the studio insisted on retaining her ethnicity for the film. "I was mostly interested in a Black Susan Storm and a Black Johnny Storm and a Black Franklin Storm...when you're dealing with a studio on a massive movie like that, everybody wants to keep an open mind to who the big stars are going be...I found a lot of pretty heavy push back on casting a Black woman in that role." He added that being denied a Black Susan Storm should have convinced him to step away from the project.

=== Filming ===
Fantastic Four had a production budget of $155 million. Principal photography commenced on May 5, 2014, at the Celtic Media Centre in Baton Rouge, Louisiana and ended on August 23, 2014, lasting for 72 days. The film received $29.1 million in tax incentives and spent $97.4 million in Louisiana. Matthew Jensen served as director of photography. The film was planned to be shot in Vancouver, Canada, but was moved to Louisiana due to the state's film production tax incentives. During filming, producers Hutch Parker and Simon Kinberg rewrote Trank's original script and gave the film a different ending. In January 2015, reshoots were ordered by 20th Century Fox executives who were dissatisfied with the film, feeling that it felt more like a sequel to Chronicle.

Before the film's release, several sources had reported that there were multiple disagreements between 20th Century Fox and Trank during production. After being dissatisfied with Trank's original cut, Fox ordered their own changes to the film without Trank's supervision, changing and omitting certain major plot points from Trank's version. Many other sources claimed that there was "erratic behavior" from Trank on the set of the film, which resulted in Fox's negative treatment of him. Teller and Trank reportedly nearly came to blows during filming. One day prior to the film's release Trank posted a message on Twitter that criticized the finished film. Expressing dissatisfaction towards the final product, he stated, "A year ago I had a fantastic version of this. And it would've received great reviews. You'll probably never see it. That's reality though." Trank deleted the message shortly after. While Fox distribution chief Chris Aronson claimed that Fox supported Trank's version of the film, Kebbell conversely stated, "I tell you, the honest truth is [Trank] did cut a great film that you'll never see. That is a shame. A much darker version, and you'll never see it." Trank further disowned the film by removing it from his Instagram filmography.

After Stan Lee's death three years later, Trank stated that he had "let him down", though after the film's release, he had received a personal letter from Lee asking him if he was okay. In 2020, Trank said that many of the sequences he had planned had gone unfilmed, making a director's cut practically nonexistent. Trank later stated he does not regret doing the film because it led to him where he was. Later that year, Kate Mara stated that her experience working on the film was "horrible". While she did not go into great detail, she implied that much of her discomfort came from questionable directions stating, "I think that speaking up is something that I think that we all probably learn it [sic] over and over again... I don't regret doing it at all, but do regret not having stood up for myself. I regret that for sure." In 2025, Teller stated that he knew the film was in trouble after seeing it and voiced his concerns to one of the studio heads. He also referred to an unnamed person who "kind of fucked it all up".

=== Post-production ===
The film used the Los Angeles-based company OTOY for its visual effects. Moving Picture Company (MPC), Hydraulx, Rodeo FX and Weta Digital also created visual effects for the film. MPC took on the visual effects for The Thing, rendering a fully-digital character based on Jamie Bell's on-set performance and the Human Torch's fiery visual effects. Weta Digital handled Reed Richards' stretch effects. Hydraulx delivered Susan Storm's force-field and cloaking effects and augmented Doom's costume. James E. Price served as the over-all visual effects supervisor. Kinberg stated that the film would be converted to 3D in post-production, but those plans were canceled, with Trank stating that he wanted "the viewing experience of Fantastic Four to remain as pure as possible for the audience, which means in 2D". A sequence showing The Thing performing a "dive-bomb" in the film was cut due to budget constraints.

The studio was caught off-guard by the first cut of the film for having a "morose tone". The ending had not been finalized and the studio hastily had to cobble together a new ending that was essentially written of script pieces of the original draft, plus new ones that were being written on the day of reshoots. Many of Trank's suggestions were ignored. Stephen E. Rivkin was hired to edit the film together with Trank, referring to him as the "de facto director" for the new cut. Despite Trank's efforts to have two edits of the film, Rivkin's was ultimately chosen over his.

== Music ==
In January 2015, Marco Beltrami was hired to compose the film's score. Philip Glass was also hired to work on the score with Beltrami. Additional music contributions were made by Miles Hankins, Brandon Roberts, Marcus Trumpp, and Buck Sanders, with American hip-hop recording artist El-P scoring the end credits of the film. To promote the film, Kim Nam-joon, known as RM of the K-pop group BTS, and American recording artist Mandy Ventrice, worked on the digital single "Fantastic", which was released alongside the South Korean run of the film. In July 2015, Beltrami attended the 2015 San Diego Comic-Con to discuss scoring the film. Beltrami described the score as "eerie" and "mysterious", landing it in a "musical territory leaning towards fantasy." The film score was released on August 7, 2015, by Sony Classical Records. Despite the film's negative reception, the soundtrack was singled out by critics as one of the film's better qualities.

== Release ==
=== Marketing ===
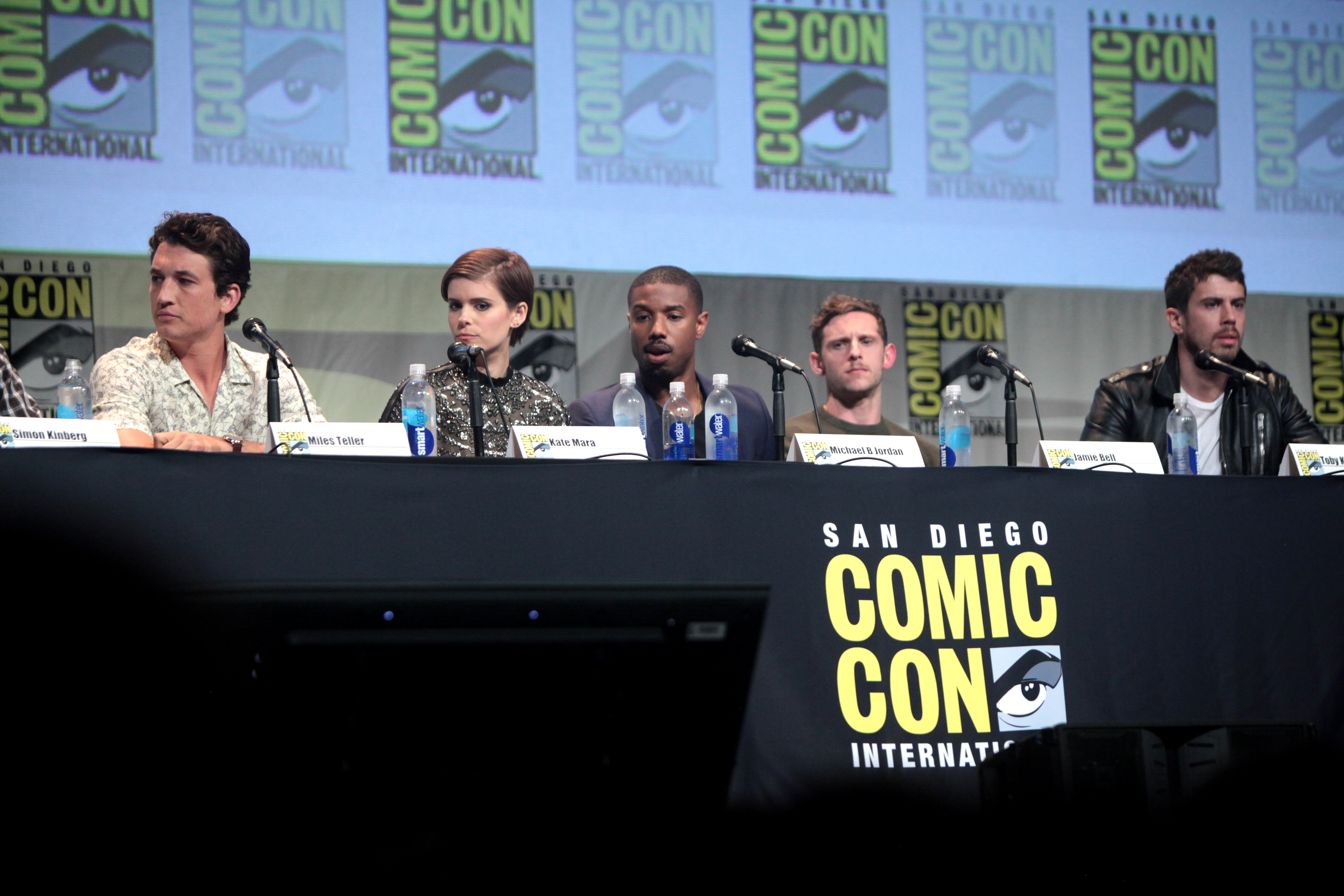
The cast of Fantastic Four, including Miles Teller, Kate Mara, Michael B. Jordan, Jamie Bell and Toby Kebbell at the 2015 San Diego Comic-Con to promote the film.

The teaser trailer for Fantastic Four was released in January 2015 to a generally positive response. Graeme McMillan of The Hollywood Reporter gave the trailer a positive review, calling it a "surprisingly strong step in the right direction for a faithful adaptation of an often-problematic property." Abraham Riesman of New York's Vulture also responded to the trailer positively, saying that the film "could be the most innovative and tonally unique marquee superhero movie." However, correspondents for Newsarama noted that there was "nothing" in the trailer to characterize it as being based on the Fantastic Four, feeling it could have easily been a substitute for similar science fiction films such as 2014's Interstellar. The trailer became the most-watched trailer in 20th Century Fox's history, surpassing the previous record-holder, 2014's X-Men: Days of Future Past.

The second trailer for the film was released in April 2015. Sean O'Connell of CinemaBlend called the trailer "amazing" and said that it "does a much better job of setting up everyone's roles." Drew McWeeny of HitFix said the film "looks like it was approached with serious intent" and that the scale "feels positively intimate." In the same month, the cast attended CinemaCon to present footage from the film, which also generated positive reviews.

=== Theatrical ===
The world premiere of Fantastic Four was at Williamsburg Cinemas in New York City on August 4, 2015. It was released in North America on August 7, 2015, on 3,995 screens. In December 2012, it was scheduled for March 6, 2015 release, which was changed in November 2013 to June 19, 2015, before settling on its final date of August 7, 2015.

=== Home media ===
Fantastic Four was released by 20th Century Fox Home Entertainment on Blu-ray and DVD on December 15, 2015. It was later released on Ultra HD Blu-ray on March 1, 2016. It was also released on the Disney+ streaming service in June 2020, the first Marvel movie produced by Fox to be on the service.

As of February 2016, Fantastic Four had sold nearly 400,000 DVD copies and 350,000 Blu-ray copies, for a total of 750,000 copies. As of December 2018, the film had grossed $13.4 million on home video.

== Reception ==
=== Box office ===
Fantastic Four grossed $56.1 million in North America and $111.8 million in other territories for a worldwide total of $168 million, against a production budget of $120 million (estimated $200 million including marketing and distribution costs), making it the lowest grossing theatrically released Fantastic Four film to date.

In the United States and Canada, Fantastic Four was projected to take the top spot and earn around $40–50 million on its opening weekend, which would be lower than the opening weekend gross of 2005's Fantastic Four ($56.1 million) and 2007's Fantastic Four: Rise of the Silver Surfer ($58.1 million). The film made $2.7 million from late night previews on the night of August 6. On its opening day, Fantastic Four earned $11.3 million (including Thursday's preview screenings), lower than early tracking, and $25.6 million on its opening weekend, marking one of the lowest openings of all time for a big-budget superhero movie which box office analysts have attributed to poor critical reviews and audience reception. It came in second place behind Mission: Impossible – Rogue Nation ($28.5 million). When asked by The New York Times to comment on the weekend box office results, Chris Aronson, Fox's president of domestic distribution said: "There's not much to say. I have never seen a confluence of events impact the opening of a movie so swiftly," referring to negative reviews and a tweet by Trank that blamed the studio for the poor reviews. In the film's second weekend, it grossed $8 million, dropping 69% from the opening weekend. The Hollywood Reporter described the film as the second biggest box office failure of 2015, behind Tomorrowland, estimating the film's losses to be between $80 million and $100 million.

Outside North America, the film grossed $33.1 million on its opening weekend from 43 countries from 8,996 screens, coming at second place behind Rogue Nation at the international box office. While it underperformed in certain countries, it opened at number one in 20 countries. Its top openings were in Mexico ($5.29 million), the United Kingdom, Ireland and Malta ($4.19 million), France ($3.85 million), Venezuela ($3.81 million) and Brazil ($3 million).

=== Critical reception ===
On the review aggregator website Rotten Tomatoes, 9% of 259 critics' reviews are positive, with an average rating of 3.7/10. The website's consensus reads: "Dull and downbeat, this Fantastic Four proves a woefully misguided attempt to translate a classic comic series without the humor, joy, or colorful thrills that made it great." As of 2025, it has the lowest ratings on Rotten Tomatoes out of all theatrical films based on Marvel Comics properties. Metacritic, which uses a weighted average, assigned the film a score of 27 out of 100, based on 40 critics, indicating "generally unfavorable" reviews. Audiences polled by CinemaScore gave the film an average grade of "C−" on an A+ to F scale; this fact was referred to by Pamela McClintock of The Hollywood Reporter as "the worst grade that anyone can remember for a marquee superhero title made by a major Hollywood studio."

Peter Travers of Rolling Stone gave Fantastic Four one star out of four, calling it "the cinematic equivalent of malware" and "worse than worthless." Jim Vejvoda of IGN criticized the film as "aesthetically drab and dramatically inert", said that the two previous Fantastic Four films "seem better in hindsight", and that the film did not show enough character development between the members of the team. He also criticized the continuity errors, such as Mara's changing hair style and color and Teller's disappearing facial hair, brought on by the film's reshoots. Brian Lowry of Variety found the film to be a technical improvement over the 2005 release but criticized its uneven pacing and writing, saying "Ultimately, Fox's stab at reviving one of its inherited Marvel properties feels less like a blockbuster for this age of comics-oriented tentpoles than it does another also-ran—not an embarrassment, but an experiment that didn't gel." Todd McCarthy of The Hollywood Reporter felt the film is "like a 100-minute trailer for a movie that never happens." He called the film "maddeningly lame and unimaginative" in addition to criticizing the visual style as a "dark, unattractive, gloomy mode." In a review for Screen Daily, Tim Grierson criticized the film's narrative as nonsensical, making the film "progressively more muddled and tedious." A.O. Scott of The New York Times noted that it "feels less like a tale of superhero beginnings than like a very long precredit opening sequence."

David Jenkins of Little White Lies, on the other hand, praised Fantastic Four for its stylistic deviation from other recent superhero films, and argued that the film's characters "make decisions which may appear to lack credibility, but the writing works hard to show you why these people are doing what they are doing – and it's not just haphazard patching work, but believable reasons which build on the themes of the movie". James Berardinelli gave the film 2.5/4 stars, saying Fantastic Four is "no better or worse [than] the other superhero movies of 2015", welcoming the dark tone, and praising the performance of the main actors. Berardinelli concluded that as a superhero film, "it falls into the 'adequate' range of the spectrum—neither memorable nor forgettable." Jake Wilson of The Sydney Morning Herald gave the film 3/5 stars, praising the Fantastic Four's transformation sequence and Teller's performance, and wrote: "what distinguishes the film's approach is the faith it puts in its young lead actors".

Yahoo! Movies, Toronto Sun, IndieWire, and Rolling Stone have included Fantastic Four in their lists compiling the worst films of 2015. In 2022, while promoting the Disney+ miniseries Moon Knight, the film's writer Jeremy Slater stated he had initially envisioned on giving the film a lighter tone similar to that of films from the Marvel Cinematic Universe (MCU), but that Trank was against this idea. In a retrospective piece on the film published in 2024, following the announcement of the reboot film in the MCU (that would be The Fantastic Four: First Steps, released the following year), Samuel Williamson of Collider gave the opinion that putting the Fantastic Four inside a gritty drama made no sense, further opining that Miles Teller was too young for the role of Reed Richards/Mr. Fantastic at the time of the film's release and that Jamie Bell had been miscast as Ben Grimm/The Thing.

=== Accolades ===
Award	Category	Recipient	Result
BET Awards	Best Actor	Michael B. Jordan (also for Creed)	Won
CinemaCon	Ensemble Award	Miles Teller, Michael B. Jordan, Kate Mara and Jamie Bell	Won
Teen Choice Awards	Choice Movie: Sci-Fi/Fantasy	Fantastic Four	Nominated
Golden Raspberry Awards	Worst Picture	Simon Kinberg, Matthew Vaughn, Hutch Parker, Robert Kulzer and Gregory Goodman	Won (Note: Tied with Fifty Shades of Grey.)
Golden Raspberry Awards	Worst Director	Josh Trank	Won
Golden Raspberry Awards	Worst Screenplay	Jeremy Slater, Simon Kinberg and Josh Trank; Based on the Marvel Comics characters by Stan Lee and Jack Kirby	Nominated
Golden Raspberry Awards	Worst Screen Combo	All four "Fantastics" (Miles Teller, Michael B. Jordan, Kate Mara and Jamie Bell)	Nominated
Golden Raspberry Awards	Worst Prequel, Remake, Rip-off or Sequel	Simon Kinberg, Matthew Vaughn, Hutch Parker, Robert Kulzer and Gregory Goodman	Won
Golden Schmoes Awards	Worst Movie of the Year	Fantastic Four	Won
Golden Schmoes Awards	Biggest Disappointment of the Year	Fantastic Four	Won
Houston Film Critics Society Awards	Worst Picture	Fantastic Four	Nominated
St. Louis Gateway Film Critics Association Awards	Worst Film	Fantastic Four	Nominated

== Future ==
=== Cancelled sequel ===
Before Fantastic Four began filming, 20th Century Fox announced plans for a sequel with a scheduled release date of July 14, 2017. Fox then rescheduled the release for June 2, 2017, with War for the Planet of the Apes taking its place on the July 14, 2017, slot. It changed the release date again to June 9, 2017, to be two weeks after Star Wars: The Last Jedi's initial scheduled release date of May 26, 2017.

Due to Fantastic Four's poor box office performance, negative reviews, and poor home media sales, Pamela McClintock of The Hollywood Reporter said that it "throws into question whether Fox will move ahead with a sequel". Phil Hoad of The Guardian said it would "be interesting" to see if Fox proceeds with a sequel and if it keeps the "gritty-on-paper" tone, noting that if Fox did not produce another film by 2022, the rights would revert to Marvel Studios. Despite the performance, Fox still planned to produce a sequel, with Simon Kinberg working on the project. Drew McWeeny of HitFix said that while a sequel may not be produced in time for the 2017 release date, Fox would likely attempt to salvage the franchise, working with Trank's defined vision and adding adjustments to it. While Kinberg affirmed his intent to make a sequel, Kate Mara said that a sequel looked unlikely, despite expressing interest in reprising her role as Susan Storm. In September 2015, Tommy Wiseau expressed enthusiasm in directing a sequel, having personal admiration for the film.

The sequel was removed from Fox's release schedule in November 2015. In May 2016, Kinberg reaffirmed his intent to make another Fantastic Four film with the same cast. Later that month, Toby Kebbell stated he had no interest in reprising his role as Dr. Doom if a sequel were to happen. In August, both Miles Teller and Kate Mara said they were open to returning for a sequel. When asked by Collider whether they would make another Fantastic Four film, Kinberg answered: "I have no idea. I think the truth is we would not do another Fantastic Four movie until it was ready to be made. One of the lessons we learned on that movie is we want to make sure to get it 100% right, because we will not get another chance with the fans".

Matthew Vaughn had expressed interest in directing a new version of Fantastic Four himself as an apology for the performance of the 2015 film. Concept artist Alexander Lozano revealed that Trank's iteration of the Fantastic Four was considered for cameo appearances in Tim Miller's take on Deadpool 2.

=== Marvel Cinematic Universe ===
Toby Kebbell said that he would only be interested in returning to the role of Doctor Doom if he joined the Marvel Cinematic Universe (MCU). Kebbell added: "Truth is, Doom is an incredible bad guy. They just keep trying to force him into the Fantastic Four... Doom is a monster, but you know my Doom was not, so there's that". Stan Lee (co-creator of the Fantastic Four) also expressed interest in the Fantastic Four, as well as the X-Men, returning to Marvel Studios: "We should have all of our characters under Marvel. Remind me on my way home to do something about that. We'll do our best". However, Marvel Studios president Kevin Feige stated in June 2017 that there were no plans of adding the Fantastic Four to the MCU at that time. Miles Teller said in 2022 that he would return as Mister Fantastic in another Fantastic Four film "if the script is good".

In December 2017, Marvel Studios' parent company, The Walt Disney Company, agreed to acquire 20th Century Fox's parent company, 21st Century Fox. Disney's CEO Bob Iger said that they planned to integrate the Fantastic Four into the MCU. The merger was completed by March 20, 2019, and as a result, the film rights reverted to Marvel Studios. At the 2019 Marvel Studios San Diego Comic-Con Hall H presentation, Feige announced that a Fantastic Four film set in the MCU is in development. By December 2020, Jon Watts, director of the MCU films Spider-Man: Homecoming (2017), Spider-Man: Far From Home (2019), and Spider-Man: No Way Home (2021), was attached to direct, but he stepped down from the project by April 2022, citing the need to take a break from superhero films.

A multiversal variant of Reed Richards / Mister Fantastic appears in the MCU film Doctor Strange in the Multiverse of Madness (2022) as a member of the Illuminati of Earth-838, an alternate universe to the MCU's main timeline, Earth-616 (also referred to as the Sacred Timeline). He is portrayed by John Krasinski, who had previously expressed interest in portraying Richards. Additionally, the Baxter Foundation is mentioned in the film as the employer of Earth-838's Christine Palmer.

In August 2022, WandaVision director Matt Shakman was revealed to be in talks to direct the MCU Fantastic Four film; his role as director was later confirmed at the 2022 D23 event. It was also revealed that Jeff Kaplan and Ian Springer were hired to write the script, with Josh Friedman revealed in March 2023 to be a new writer.

The film, titled The Fantastic Four: First Steps, was released in the United States on July 25, 2025, as the first film in Phase Six of the MCU. Pedro Pascal, Vanessa Kirby, Ebon Moss-Bachrach, and Joseph Quinn star as the titular team, with the film depicting them as active heroes of Earth-828 instead of retelling their origin story. Robert Downey Jr. makes an uncredited cameo appearance as a new iteration of Doctor Doom, setting up his role as the antagonist of the crossover films Avengers: Doomsday (2026) and Avengers: Secret Wars (2027).
