= Alexander Olch =

American writer, director, and designer (born 1977)

Alexander Olch (born 1977) is an American writer, director, and designer.

== Education ==
Olch studied at Collegiate School in New York City and at Harvard College.

== Career ==
His film work has played on HBO, IFC, at Film Forum, in the New York Film Festival, and is part of permanent collection of The Museum of Modern Art.

He launched his eponymous design label in 2002. His design work is sold internationally at stores such as Bergdorf Goodman, Barneys New York, Colette Paris and Isetan.

Olch has been featured in The New York Times, Vanity Fair, Filmmaker Magazine, Men's Vogue, L’Uomo Vogue and GQ.

His writing has appeared in The New York Times and The Wall Street Journal.

His short film work includes No Vladimir (2000) produced by Chantal Akerman and Ross McElwee. The Windmill Movie (2009), starring Wallace Shawn, Bob Balaban and Susan Meiselas was his debut feature.

Alexander Olch x colette (2011) in Paris was his first pop-up store. Alexander Olch at 14 Orchard Street in New York City is his first flagship store

Olch is the Founder of Metrograph, an independent movie house which opened in Manhattan in 2016.

== Filmography ==
- Artemin Goldberg: Custom Tailor of Brassieres (Short) (2000)
- No Vladimir (Short) (2000)
- The Windmill Movie (2008)
