= Cinema Village =

Movie theater in Greenwich Village, New York, US

Coordinates: 40°44′2.7″N 73°59′36.2″W

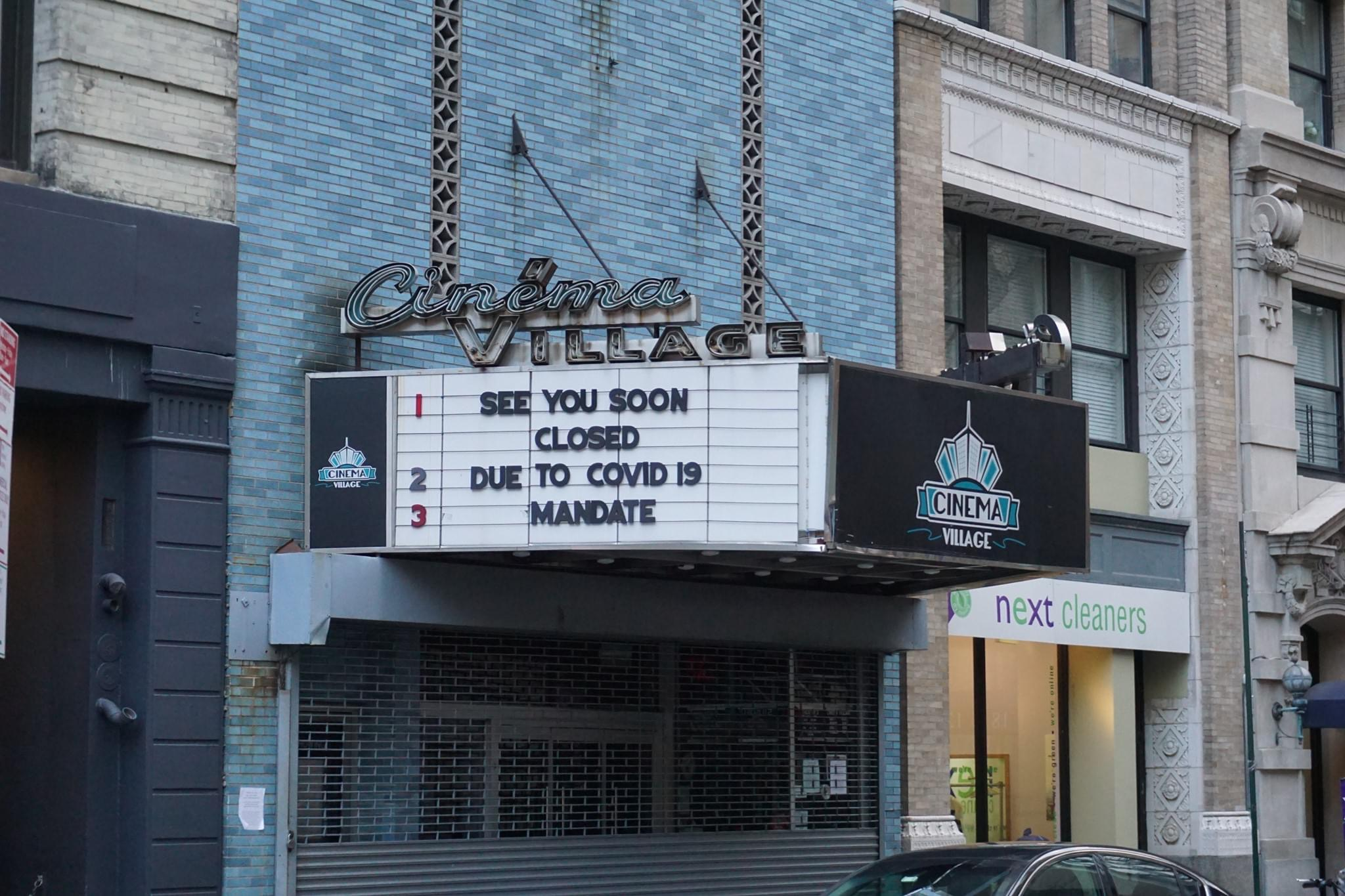
The Cinema Village in 2020 during the COVID-19 pandemic

Cinema Village is a three-screen movie theater in Greenwich Village, New York. It is the oldest continuously operated cinema in Greenwich Village.

It was opened in 1963, housed in a converted firehouse on 12th Street.

Since the 1980s, it has been owned by Nicholas "Nick" Nicolaou, a Cypriot immigrant who came to the United States at age 12. In 1975 at the age of 15, he began working at Cinema Village. In three years at age 18, he was general manager. He later bought the cinema. In a 2021 interview, Nicolaou stated that he had the opportunity to turn the theater into a nonprofit, but refused to as he considers himself a businessman, saying "I think there are good things about nonprofits but it’s not for me". Nicolaou's story is told in the film The Projectionist by Abel Ferrara.

The theater often screens independent projects that other art cinemas in New York locations won't, such as in 2014 when it made news for being one of only a handful of U.S.-based theaters to screen the FIFA propaganda film United Passions, where it grossed $140 of its $918 in its opening weekend, and when it was one of two Manhattan theaters to screen the 2014 film The Interview in the wake of the Sony hack by North Korea, bringing Cinema Village national attention.

Cinema Village is part of numerous film festivals, including: The New York Short Film Festival, The Manhattan Film Festival, The Other Israel, Workers Unite, Kino Film Festival, African Diaspora International, Winter Film Awards International Film Festival, Socially Relevant Film Festival, HUMP, Reel Recovery, Wildlife Conservation, and Arab Cinema week.

On April 5, 2024 Cinema Village employees filed to unionize with UAW Local 2179.

== See also ==
- List of art cinemas in New York City
