= Cobble Hill Cinemas =

Independent theater in Brooklyn, New York

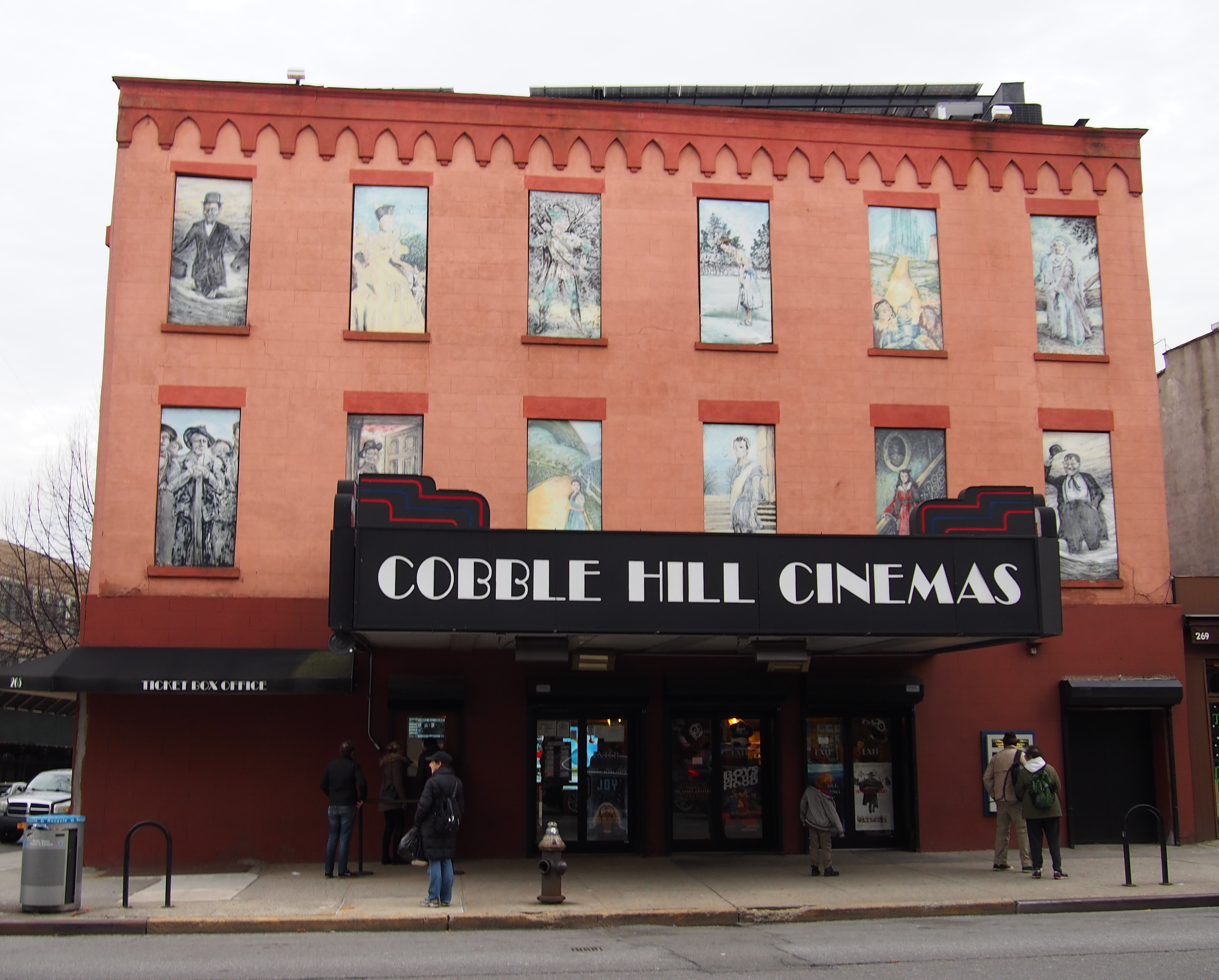
- Interactive map of Cobble Hill Cinemas
- Address: 265 Court Street
- Location: Brooklyn, New York
- Coordinates: 40°41′06″N 73°59′40″W
- Owner: Noah Elgart
- Operator: Noah Elgart
- Capacity: 635

Construction
- Built: 1926

Website
- www.cobblehillcinema.com

Cobble Hill Cinemas is a first-run independent movie theater located in Cobble Hill, Brooklyn in New York City, on the corner of Court Street and Butler Street. The cinema has five theaters, a faux-Art Deco interior, and a concession stand.

== History ==
The theater originally opened in 1926 as a single-screen picture house called The Lido Theater. On December 26, 1939, an explosion from the furnace of an adjoining pool hall caused the auditorium wall to collapse. During this, 300 theater patrons evacuated, and minor injuries occurred.

The Lido operated till 1968, when its name changed to The Rex Cinema, and it was known for screening B-movies and Kung Fu films.

In the 1980s, local theater projectionist Harvey Elgart converted the theater to Cobble Hill Cinemas, where it resumed screening first-run fare. Under this ownership, the cinema was twinned on September 24, 1982, triplexed on March 25, 1988, and two additional upstairs theaters were added on July 19, 1991, becoming a five-plex.

The cinema was notably used as a filming location for the 2007 film Spider-Man 3.

== Operation ==
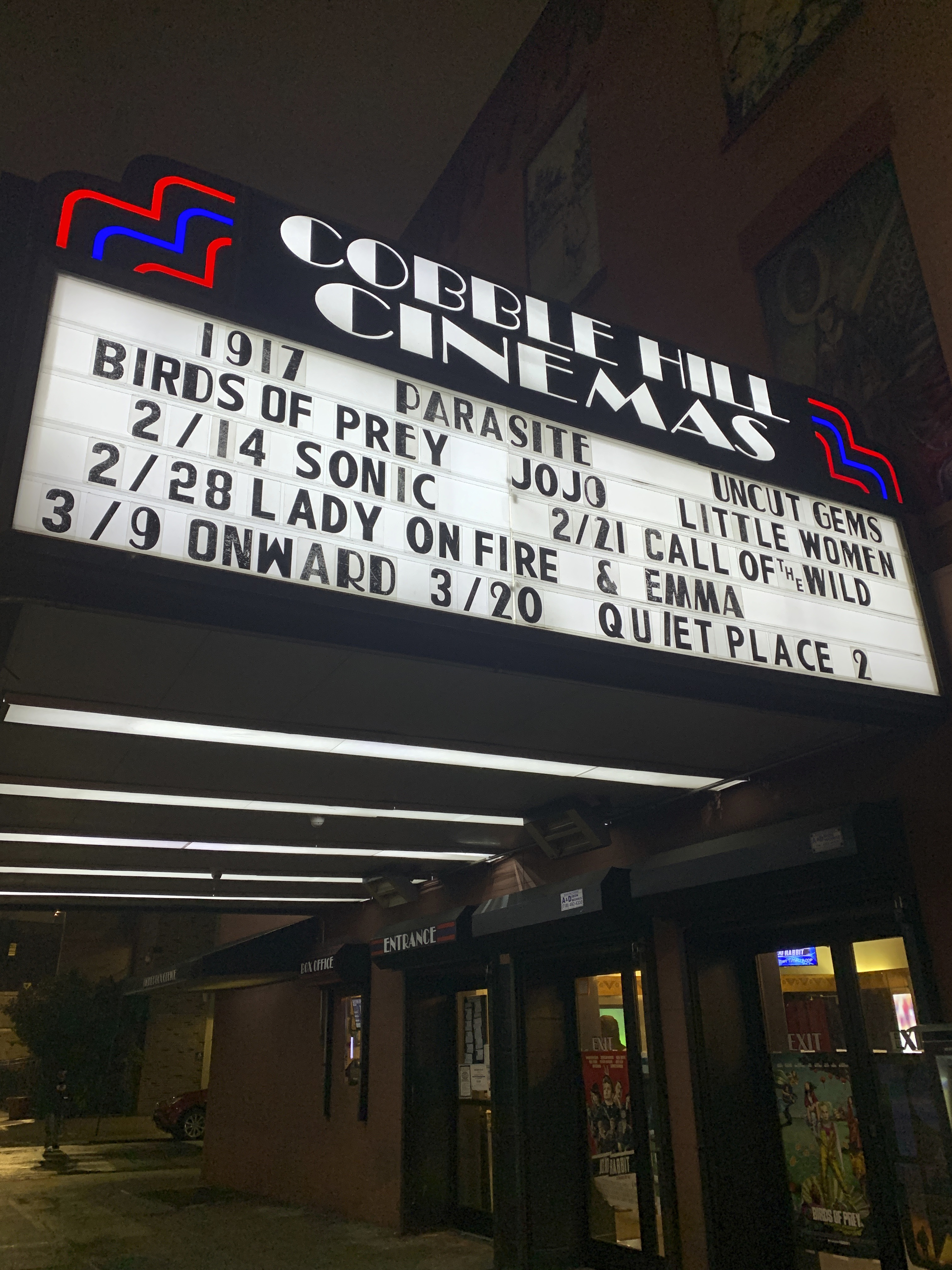
The Cobble Hill Cinemas marquee at night in February 2020

The Elgart family continues to run the theater under H&K Cinema Corp., which also manages Williamsburg Cinemas in Williamsburg, Brooklyn, Kew Gardens Cinemas in Kew Gardens, Queens, and Mamaroneck Cinemas in Mamaroneck, New York.

All five screens have updated digital projection as well as 5.1 and 7.1 Dolby Digital sound. The cinema is open year-round and seats 635 patrons.
