= Ziegfeld Theatre (1969) =

Former movie theater in Manhattan, New York

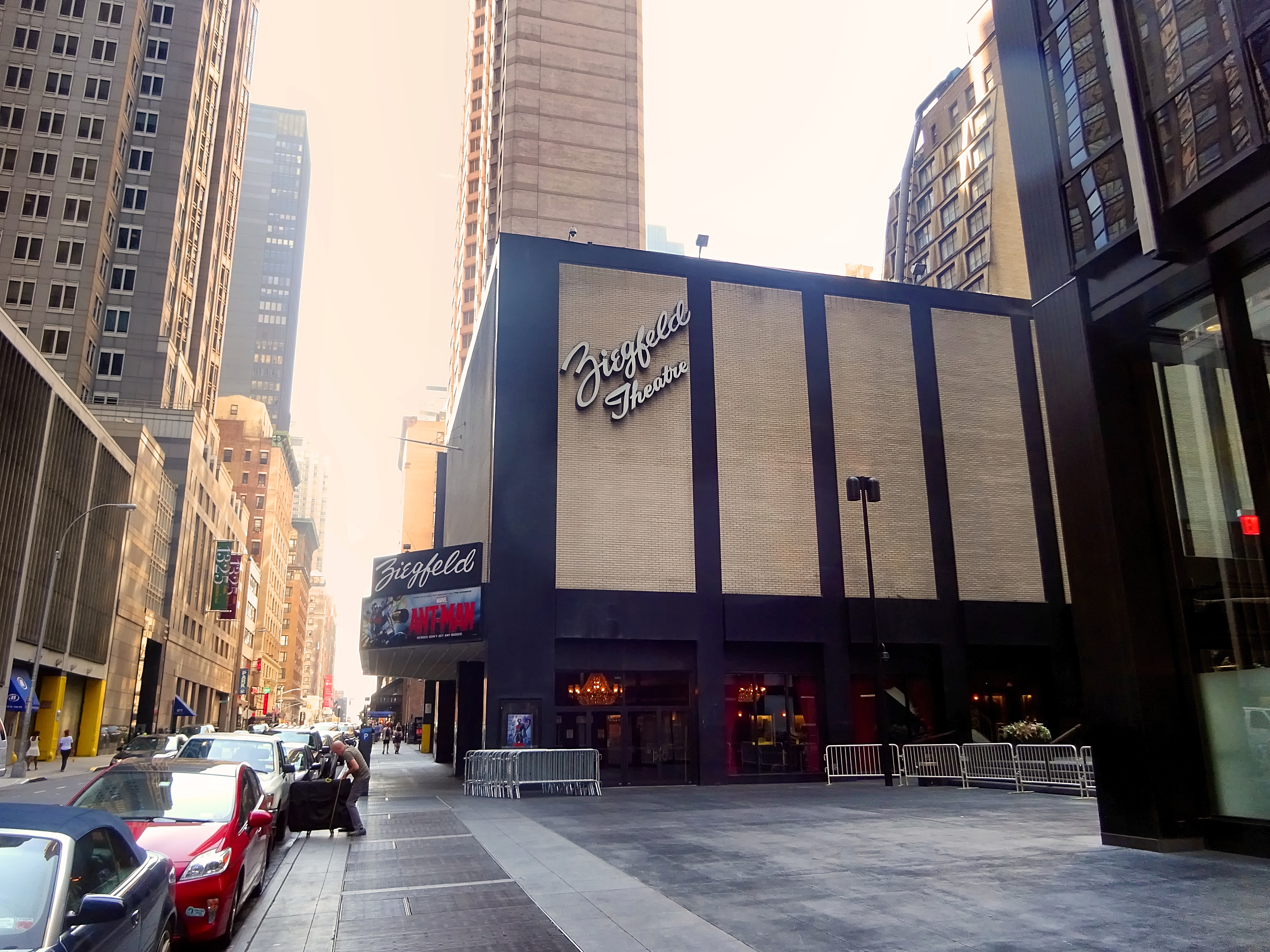
- Interactive map of Ziegfeld Theatre
- Former names: Ziegfeld Ballroom
- Address: 141 West 54th Street
- Location: New York City
- Coordinates: 40°45′46″N 73°58′44″W
- Owner: Fisher Brothers
- Operator: Core Ziegfeld L.L.C.
- Type: Movie theatre

Construction
- Opened: 17 December 1969
- Renovated: 2013
- Closed: 2016
- Architect: Emery Roth & Sons

Website
- ziegfeldballroom.com

The Ziegfeld Theatre was a single-screen movie theater located at 141 West 54th Street in midtown Manhattan in New York City. It opened in 1969 and closed in 2016. The theater was named in honor of the original Ziegfeld Theatre (1927–1966), which was built by the impresario Florenz Ziegfeld Jr.

== History ==
On December 17, 1969, a few hundred feet from the site of the original Ziegfeld Theatre, a new Ziegfeld opened as a single-screen movie house with the New York premiere of Marooned. It was the flagship of the Walter Reade movie theatre chain.

Constructed by Emery Roth & Sons from designs by Irving Gershon it was built on part of the old theatre and was the first new theatre in the Times Square area since Radio City Music Hall was built in 1932. It was one of the last large-scale, single-screen movie palaces built in the United States. The gold and maroon interior was designed by John J. McNamara at a cost of $600,000.

The theatre had 1,152 seats (825 seats in the orchestra section and 306 seats in the tiered rear section).

After Marooned it showed reissues until July 1, 1970, when it had the world premiere of Walt Disney Productions' The Boatniks. From then it was often used for world premieres and big-event press screenings, such as the November 1977 opening of Close Encounters of the Third Kind.

In 1987, Cineplex Odeon Corporation acquired the Walter Reade Organization and took over operation of the theatre. The theater underwent extensive renovations in the late 1990s. It was a centerpiece site during the 2008 New York Film Festival because of reconstruction work at Lincoln Center that year. During the 2000s, digital projection was installed. The theater became the largest single-screen cinema operating in New York. The screen was 20 feet tall and 52 feet wide, making it the largest non-IMAX screen in New York City.

From 2013 until its closing, the Ziegfeld was managed by Bow Tie Cinemas, on behalf of Cablevision, which owned the theater. The theater was previously part of the Clearview Cinemas chain, which was owned by Cablevision, prior to the chain's sale to Bow Tie; the actual ownership of the Ziegfeld building was excluded from the sale. In an April 2015 interview, Cablevision CEO James L. Dolan said the theater "loses a lot of money" and might be shuttered.

=== Closure ===
On January 20, 2016, Fisher Brothers (which owned 141 West 54th Street) announced that the Ziegfeld would close shortly due to dwindling attendance and revenue, which caused the operators to lose their lease. Eight days later, the Ziegfeld Theatre closed as a large single-screen movie theater with a final showing of the film Star Wars: The Force Awakens. The theater underwent a major renovation and reopened in November 2017 as a luxury event space called the Ziegfeld Ballroom.

== See also ==
- List of art cinemas in New York City
- List of buildings, sites, and monuments in New York City
- List of theaters in New York
