= Williamsburg Cinemas =

Multiplex theater in Brooklyn, New York

Coordinates: 40.7141°N 73.9599°W

- Official logo of Williamsburg Cinemas

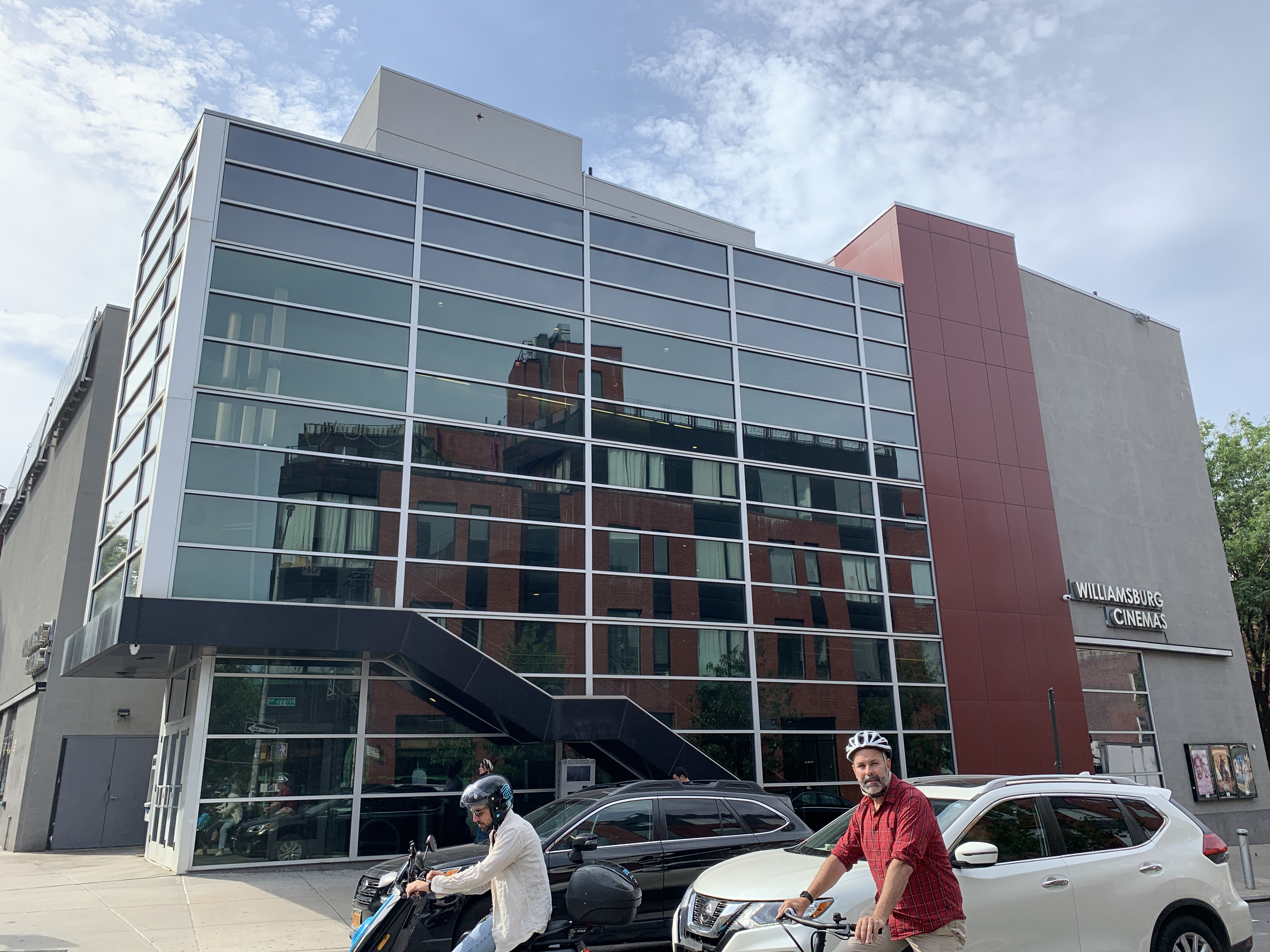
- Interactive map of Williamsburg Cinemas
- Address: 217 Grand Street, Brooklyn, NY 11211
- Owner: Noah Elgart
- Operator: Noah Elgart

Construction
- Built: 2012
- Opened: December 19, 2012
- Architect: JKR Partners

Website
- www.williamsburgcinemas.com

Williamsburg Cinemas is a first-run multiplex theater located in Williamsburg, Brooklyn in New York City, on the corner of Grand Street and Driggs Avenue. The cinema has seven theaters, is 19,000 square-feet wide, has stadium-seating, and operates a concession stand.

== History ==
In early 2012, Harvey Elgart, the owner of Brooklyn's Cobble Hill Cinemas, contracted with developer Blue Zees to build Williamsburg Cinemas. The multiplex is owned by Elgart's son, Noah Elgart.

Construction of the Williamsburg Cinemas multiplex was finished in 2012, and it officially opened on December 19, 2012.

Williamsburg Cinemas has served as the site of many movie premieres since its opening, including that of the 2015 Fantastic Four film, which premiered at the multiplex on August 4, 2015.

== Features ==
Williamsburg Cinemas is notable for its 7.1 Dolby Digital surround sound system, as well as its stadium seating.
