= Independent movie theater =

Movie theater which screens non-mainstream films

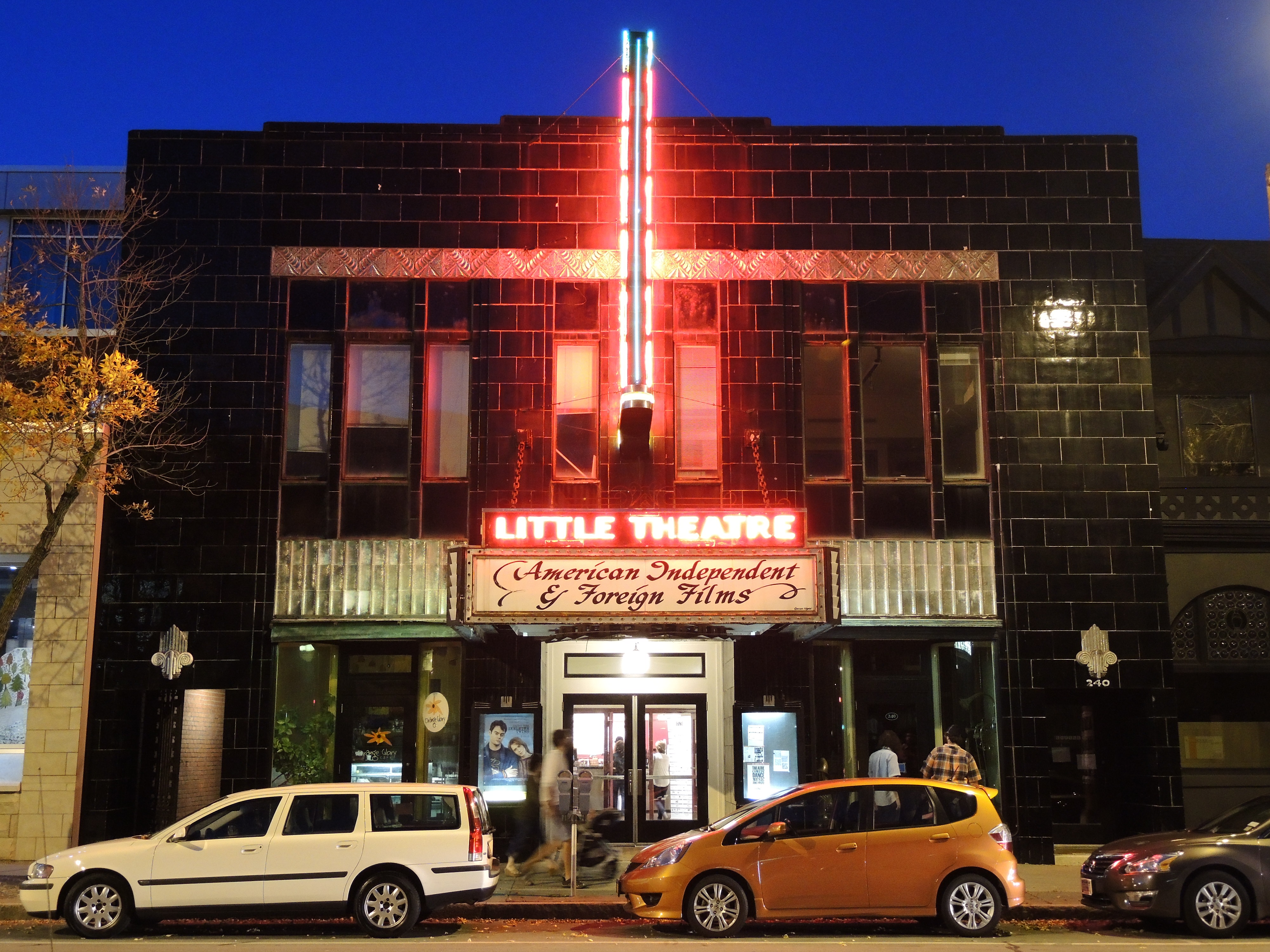
The Little Theatre in Rochester, New York, an example of an indie cinema.

An independent movie theater (American English) or indie cinema (British English) is a movie theater which screens independent, art house, foreign, or other non-mainstream films. It can be contrasted with a mainstream theater (often a multiplex), which is more likely to screen blockbusters and other popular films.

Indie theaters are often characterized by their smaller size and stronger ties to their local communities. Many are also located in historic or nontraditional venues.

Unlike mainstream theaters, which almost exclusively draw patrons looking to see a particular film and make no tacit endorsement of the films they screen, indie theaters often work to cultivate a reputation for good taste by curating a selection of high-quality films, thus drawing patrons who might know little about a film before going to see it.

== History ==
In the silent cinema era, most movie theaters were independent. In the 1930s, as talkies requiring more sophisticated equipment arose, many smaller cinemas were unable to compete with larger chains. The 1948 United States v. Paramount Pictures, Inc. Supreme Court case, which blocked movie studios from also owning cinemas, led to a resurgence of indie cinemas starting in the 1950s. In the 1980s, loosened vertical integration restrictions helped reverse this trend. Like all movie theaters, indie theaters have been financially threatened in the 21st century by the rise of streaming platforms like Netflix. Some have converted to become nonprofits.

== By region ==
=== United States ===
In the United States, the largest indie movie theaters chain is Landmark Theatres. There are some smaller regional chains such as Laemmle Theatres in Los Angeles, as well as many stand-alone venues throughout the country in places like New York City.

=== Africa ===
In South Africa, limited independent cinemas exist beside the blockbuster chains Ster-Kinekor and Nu Metro Cinemas, including The Bioscope in Johannesburg, The Labia in Cape Town, Kings Cinema in Alexandra township, and the non-traditional non-profit organization Sunshine Cinema.

== See also ==
- Independent film
- Neighborhood theatre
