= Metrograph =

Art cinema in New York City

Coordinates: 40°42′54.5″N 73°59′28″W

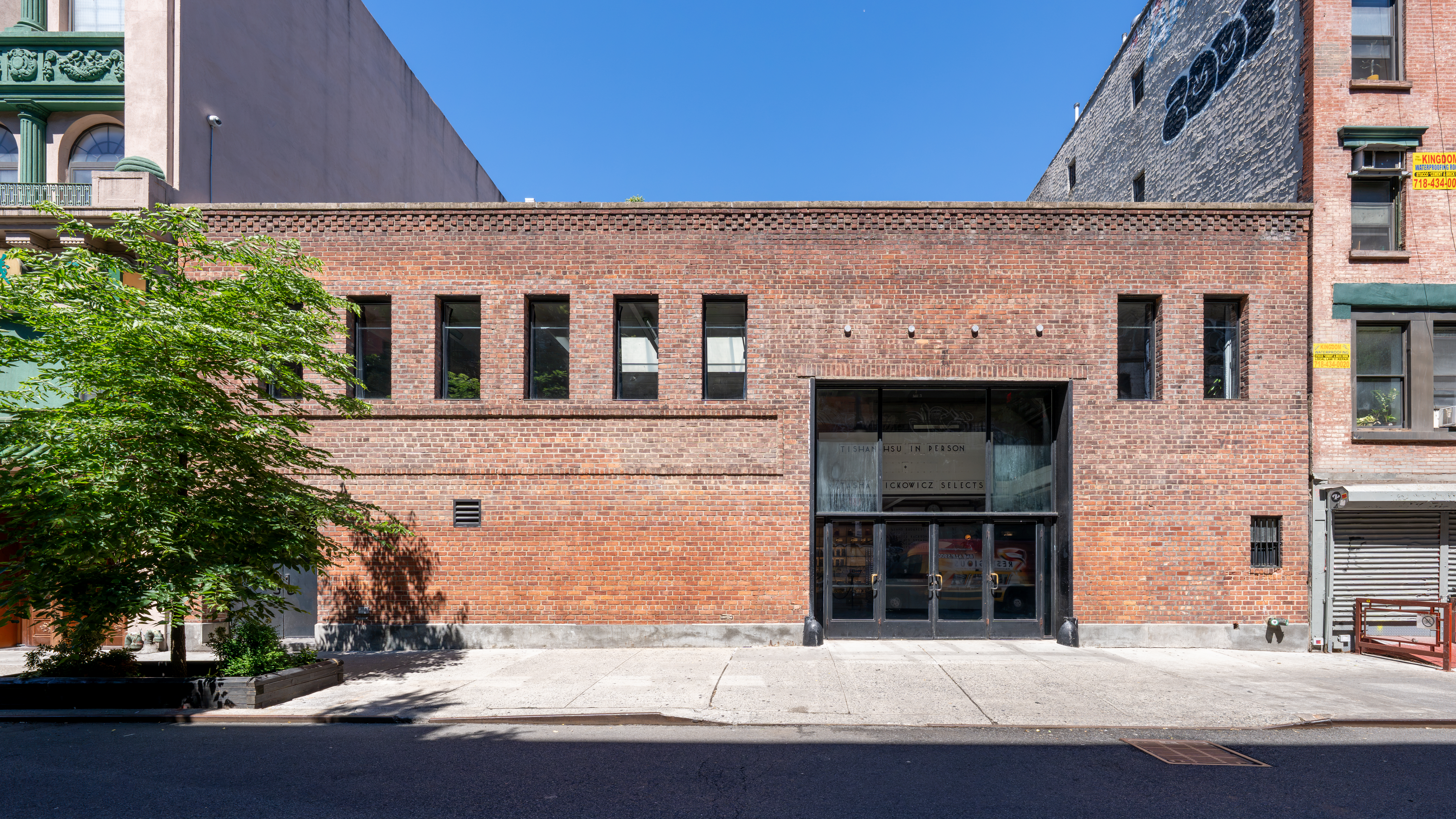
Exterior of the Metrograph in 2026

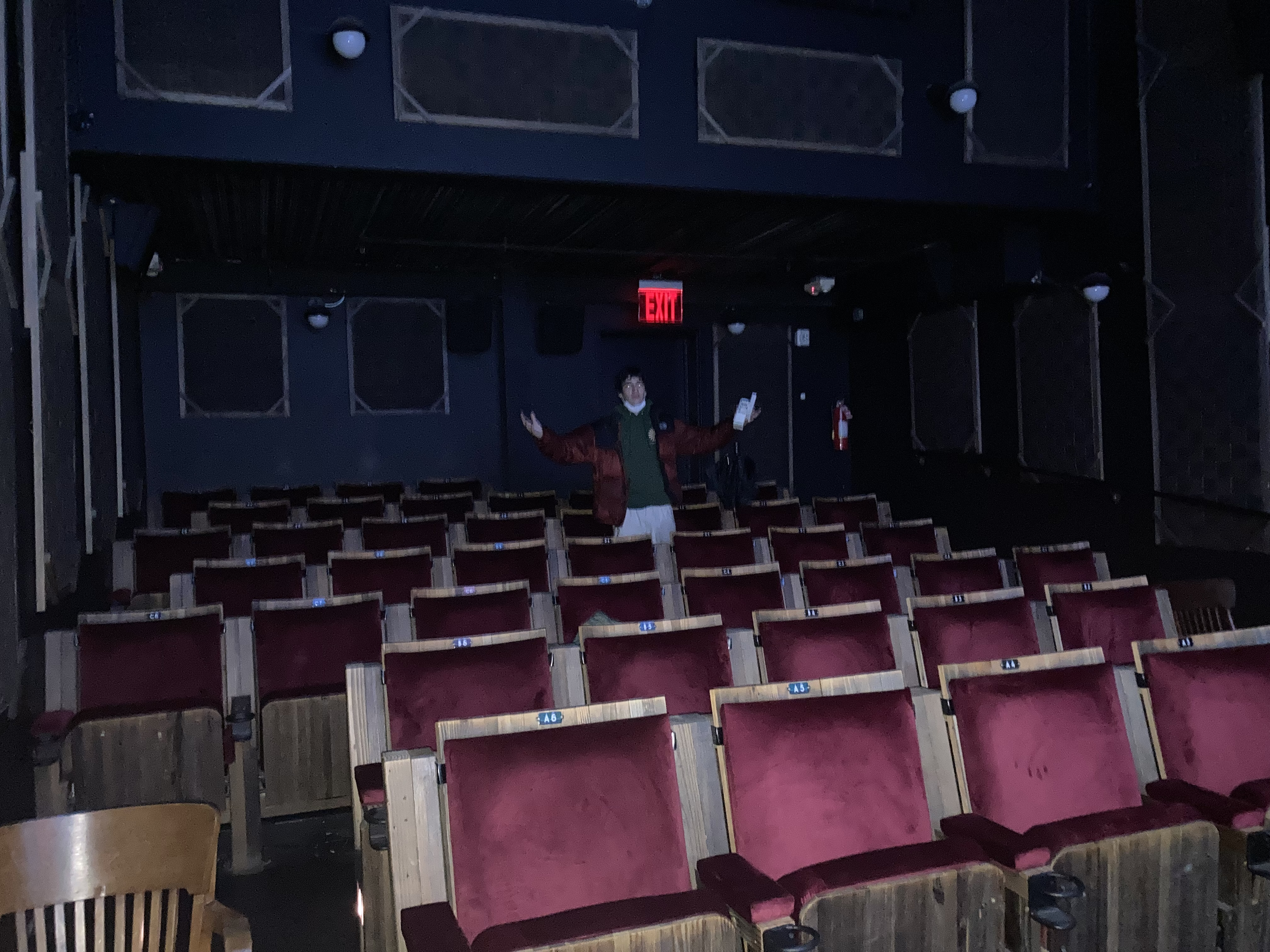
Interior of Metrograph

Metrograph is an independent two-screen movie theater located at 7 Ludlow Street in the Dimes Square section of the Lower East Side of Manhattan. As a theater, it focuses primarily on repertory cinema screenings as well as occasionally hosting new premieres and Q&A events. The theater was founded by designer and filmmaker Alexander Olch in 2016.

Since 2020, the theater has offered a digital streaming service called "Metrograph At Home". It launched an eponymous magazine in 2025.

== History ==
Metrograph was founded by Alexander Olch, a filmmaker and men's tie designer who previously owned a store and studio space elsewhere in Chinatown. The building at 7 Ludlow Street is a large, two-story refurbished warehouse space with a concrete floor and brick walls.

Metrograph first opened to the public on March 4, 2016, featuring a bar, concession stand, and two theaters downstairs with another bar, restaurant, and curated film bookstore on its second floor. At launch, the films screened at Metrograph were initially programmed by the film producers and writers Jacob Perlin and Aliza Ma.

As part of the larger wave of business closures in New York City brought on by the COVID-19 pandemic, Metrograph ceased all of its in-person operations and closed the building down on March 15, 2020. In response to this, on July 24, 2020, Metrograph launched their own online streaming service, available with a monthly membership subscription, initially called "Metrograph Digital", later renamed to "Metrograph At Home". The service provides members with remote access to a curated selection of films that had previously screened in the theater as well as new releases.

Metrograph publicly reopened its storefront more than a year later on October 1, 2021. On March 15, 2023, Metrograph announced the appointment of Inge de Leeuw as its new director of programming, stating that she would bring "an eclectic, well-rounded, and interdisciplinary approach to Metrograph's programming".

In 2025, the theater launched a film magazine, The Metrograph.

== See also ==
- List of art cinemas in New York City
