= List of theaters in New York (state) =

There are many famous theaters in New York, most notably the Broadway theatres in New York City.

- In Albany
  - The Egg Center for the Performing Arts
- In Buffalo
  - Shea's Performing Arts Center
- In New York City
  - African Grove
  - Broadway theaters
  - Chelsea Theater Center, founded in 1965 by Robert Kalfin, later closed
  - The Flea Theater
  - Hippodrome Theatre (1905–1939)
  - New York City Center
  - New York Theatre Workshop
  - Theater for the New City
  - Theatre on Nassau Street (1732–1753)
  - The Town Hall
- In Philipstown
  - Hudson Valley Shakespeare
- In Rochester
  - Eastman Theatre
  - Geva Theatre Center
- In Syracuse
  - John D. Archbold Theatre
- In Utica
  - Stanley Theater
- In West Point:
  - The Eisenhower Hall Theatre
