= PM Entertainment =

American film production company

PM Entertainment Group Inc.
- Type: Subsidiary
- Industry: Motion pictures
- Predecessor: City Lights Entertainment (1986–1990)
- Founded: 1989
- Defunct: 2002
- Fate: Assets acquired by Echo Bridge Entertainment, later sold to Minerva Pictures, then to FilmRise and later to Shout! Studios
- Successor: Shout! Studios
- Headquarters: Los Angeles, California, US
- Key people: Joseph Merhi; Richard Pepin; George Shamieh
- Products: Motion Pictures; Television Production
- Parent: The Harvey Entertainment Company (2000–2002)

PM Entertainment Group Inc. (stylized as pm entertainment group, incorporated) was an American production, distribution company which produced a distinctive line of low-to-medium budget films mostly targeted for home-video market. The company diversified into television production and larger budgeted star vehicles before being sold by its founders in 2000.

== History ==
=== City Lights Entertainment (1986–1990) ===
In 1986, Joseph Toufik Merhi and Richard Joseph Pepin, indie film directors and producers, founded the production company City Lights Entertainment with Ronald L. Gilchrist for their first movies, the comedy Hollywood In Trouble and slasher film Mayhem. The films were successful and caught the VHS direct-to-video boom beginning in the mid-late 80s.

However, in 1989, the relationship between Pepin/ Merhi and Gilchrist turned sour and their partnership was dissolved with Gilchrist and City Lights keeping the rights to the films already produced or in production. The last films released by City Lights were Payback and Contra Conspiracy in 1990. City Lights Entertainment produced eleven films from 1986 to 1990.

=== PM Entertainment Group Inc. (1989–2000) ===
Around 1989, after splitting from Ronald Gilchrist, Richard (Rick) Pepin and Joseph Merhi started PM Entertainment (PM Entertainment from surnames Pepin-Merhi). Based on the successful formula pioneered at City Lights Entertainment, PM Entertainment entered into an exclusive distribution contract with HBO and George Shamieh joined as the third partner and head of sales. The first film produced by PM Entertainment was L.A. Heat directed by Merhi and starring Lawrence Hilton-Jacobs and Jim Brown. The film was quickly followed by two sequels, L.A. Vice (1989) and Chance (1990) with Lawrence Hilton-Jacobs reprising his role as Jon Chance. He also directed Angels of the City in 1989 and cameos as Jon Chance, but the film's plot is not a sequel to L.A. Heat.

The company began bringing together a company of actors and directors to work over multiple projects, including Wings Hauser, who directed and starred in three films for the company in the early 90s, and Jeff Conaway, who starred in three films and directed Bikini Summer II.

Although the company focused primarily on the action market and exploitation films, they attempted to diversify into children's films (Magic Kid and Bigfoot: The Unforgettable Encounter) and dramas (Cellblock Sisters: Banished Behind Bars) with limited success. During the '90s, PM Entertainment had success within the kickboxing and martial arts genre and championed Cynthia Rothrock and Don "The Dragon" Wilson in multiple film projects.

In 1996, PM Entertainment diversified into television production with the TV series L.A. Heat, which is largely unrelated to their earlier film, L.A. Heat as neither Lawrence Hilton-Jacobs nor his character, Det. Jon Chance, appear in the show. Instead, it focuses on Chester "Chase" McDonald (Wolf Larson) and Detective August Brooks (Steven Williams), two Los Angeles police detectives investigating robbery/homicides. The series aired on TNT for two seasons beginning on March 15, 1999. Following the success of L.A. Heat, PM developed a second TV series, Hollywood Safari, which acted as a continuation of their 1997 film of the same name with Ted Jan Roberts reprising his role as Josh Johnson and was joined by Sam J. Jones playing his father, Troy. The show ran for one season before its cancellation.

In 1997, PM Entertainment decided that they wanted to double its own facilities on Sun Valley, in order to move to a nearly 15-acre site.

=== The Harvey Entertainment Company (2000–2002) ===
PM Entertainment's business model changed in the late '90s to accommodate distributors' requirement that films hire bankable names for projects, and they began making films such as Inferno with Jean-Claude van Damme which greatly affected their profit margin. Joseph Merhi and Richard Pepin sold the company to The Harvey Entertainment Company in early 2000 $6.5 million in cash and a further $1.45 million in stock. George Shamieh remained as head of the company under the new owners. The company continued to produce star vehicles such as Layover with David Hasselhoff and Camouflage with Leslie Nielsen, but Shamieh departed the company in late 2000 due to financial restructuring of The Harvey Entertainment Company.

CineTel Films was brought in to market the library of PM Entertainment and sell rights for upcoming productions Con Express and Lost Treasure with Stephen Baldwin. These would be the last films produced under the PM Entertainment banner. Facing liquidation, in 2001, The Harvey Entertainment Company sold off its assets, excluding PM Entertainment, to Classic Media, although PM Entertainment remained in the hands of Harvey chief Roger Burlage, which later placed the company up for sale, and two years later, the company sold PM Entertainment and its library of over 150 films and 2 TV series to Echo Bridge Entertainment, who also acquired the assets of CineTel Films. In 2021, as part of Echo Bridge's folding into SP Distribution, PM Entertainment Group's library was sold to FilmRise, which 4 years later would be acquired by Shout! Studios, which now owns the rights to the PM Entertainment Group catalog, however Minerva Pictures still handles international distribution rights to the catalog such as Pure Danger and Running Red.

== Films ==
| Release date | Title | Notes | | |
|---|---|---|---|---|
| 1989 | L.A. Heat | starring Lawrence Hilton-Jacobs | | |
| 1989 | Midnight Warrior | starring Kevin Bernhardt | | |
| 1989 | Shotgun | starring Rif Hutton | | |
| 1989 | Deadly Breed | | | |
| 1989 | Angels of the City | Lawrence Hilton-Jacobs cameos as Jon Chance from L.A. Heat | | |
| 1989 | L.A. Vice | sequel to L.A. Heat | | |
| 1989 | East L.A. Warriors | | | |
| 1989 | Hollywood's New Blood | distribution only; produced in 1988 | | |
| 1989 | Chillers | distribution only; produced in 1987 | | |
| 1990 | Sinners | | | |
| 1990 | Coldfire | starring and directed by Wings Hauser | | |
| 1990 | Chance | sequel to L.A. Heat and L.A. Vice; Final appearance of Lawrence Hilton-Jacobs as Jon Chance. | | |
| 1990 | Night of the Wilding | starring Erik Estrada | | |
| 1990 | American Born | | | |
| 1990 | Living to Die | starring and directed by Wings Hauser | | |
| 1990 | Repo Jake | starring Dan Haggerty | | |
| 1991 | The Killers Edge | starring Wings Hauser, Karen Black and Robert Z'Dar | | |
| 1991 | The Killing Zone | | | |
| 1991 | The Art of Dying | starring and directed by Wings Hauser | | |
| 1991 | Quiet Fire | starring and directed by Lawrence Hilton-Jacobs | | |
| 1991 | Ring of Fire | starring Don "The Dragon" Wilson | | |
| 1991 | A Time to Die | starring Traci Lords | | |
| 1991 | Bikini Summer | | | |
| 1992 | The Last Riders | starring Erik Estrada | | |
| 1992 | Final Impact | starring Lorenzo Lamas | | |
| 1992 | Deadly Bet | starring Jeff Wincott | | |
| 1992 | Maximum Force | starring Sam J. Jones | | |
| 1992 | Street Crimes | | | |
| 1992 | CIA Code Name: Alexa | starring Kathleen Kinmont, Lorenzo Lamas and O. J. Simpson | | |
| 1992 | Intent to Kill | starring Traci Lords and Yaphet Kotto | | |
| 1992 | Out for Blood | starring Don "The Dragon" Wilson | | |
| 1992 | Bikini Summer II | sequel to Bikini Summer | | |
| 1993 | Alien Intruder | starring Billy Dee Williams, Jeff Conaway and Maxwell Caulfield | | |
| 1993 | Ring of Fire II: Blood and Steel | sequel to Ring of Fire | | |
| 1993 | Fist of Honor | starring Sam J. Jones | | |
| 1993 | Magic Kid | | | |
| 1993 | To Be The Best | | | |
| 1993 | Sunset Strip | starring Jeff Conaway | | |
| 1993 | Private Wars | starring Steve Railsback | | |
| 1993 | Firepower | starring Gary Daniels | | |
| 1993 | Amore! | starring Jack Scalia and Kathy Ireland | | |
| 1993 | CIA II: Target Alexa | sequel to CIA Code Name: Alexa | | |
| 1993 | No Escape, No Return | starring Maxwell Caulfield and Dustin Nguyen | | |
| 1994 | Storybook | | | |
| 1994 | Magic Kid II | | | |
| 1994 | Direct Hit | starring William Forsythe | | |
| 1994 | Forced to Kill | starring Michael Ironside | | |
| 1994 | CyberTracker | starring Don "The Dragon" Wilson | | |
| 1994 | Zero Tolerance | starring Robert Patrick | | |
| 1994 | Ice | starring Traci Lords | | |
| 1994 | Deadly Target | starring Gary Daniels | | |
| 1994 | A Dangerous Place | starring Ted Jan Roberts and Corey Feldman | | |
| 1994 | Guardian Angel | starring Cynthia Rothrock | | |
| 1994 | T-Force | starring Jack Scalia | | |
| 1994 | Ring of Fire III: Lion Strike | sequel to Ring of Fire and Ring of Fire II: Blood and Steel | | |
| 1995 | Forbidden Games | | | |
| 1995 | Steel Frontier | starring Joe Lara, Bo Svenson, Brion James and Kane Hodder | | |
| 1995 | Bigfoot: The Unforgettable Encounter | starring Matt McCoy and Zachery Ty Bryan | | |
| 1995 | Hologram Man | starring Joe Lara | | |
| 1995 | The Knickerbocker Gang: The Talking Grave | | | |
| 1995 | The Power Within | starring Ted Jan Roberts and William Zabka | | |
| 1995 | To the Limit | starring Anna Nicole Smith, sequel to DaVinci's War | | |
| 1995 | Last Man Standing | starring Jeff Wincott | | |
| 1995 | Rage | starring Gary Daniels | | |
| 1995 | Cyber Tracker 2 | sequel to CyberTracker | | |
| 1995 | Caged Hearts | | | |
| 1995 | Cellblock Sisters: Banished Behind Bars | | | |
| 1995 | Sinful Intrigue | | | |
| 1995 | Two Bits & Pepper | starring Joe Piscopo | | |
| 1995 | Under Lock and Key | | | |
| 1996 | The Sweeper | starring Jeff Fahey | | |
| 1996 | Skyscraper | starring Anna Nicole Smith | | |
| 1996 | Tiger Heart | starring Ted Jan Roberts | | |
| 1996 | The Silencers | starring Jack Scalia | | |
| 1996 | Sword of Honor | starring Steven Vincent Leigh | | |
| 1996 | Pure Danger | starring and directed by C. Thomas Howell | | |
| 1996 | Dark Breed | starring Jack Scalia | | |
| 1996 | My Uncle the Alien | | | |
| 1996 | Riot | starring Gary Daniels | | |
| 1996 | Natural Enemy | starring Donald Sutherland | | |
| 1996 | Stormy Nights | starring Shannon Tweed | | |
| 1996 | Earth Minus Zero | starring Pat Morita and Sam J. Jones | | |
| 1997 | The Big Fall | starring and directed by C. Thomas Howell | | |
| 1997 | Busted | starring Corey Feldman, Corey Haim and Elliott Gould | | |
| 1997 | Little Bigfoot | starring P.J. Soles | | |
| 1997 | Executive Target | starring Michael Madsen, Roy Schieder, Keith David and Angie Everhart | | |
| 1997 | Hollywood Safari | starring John Savage, Ted Jan Roberts and Don "The Dragon" Wilson | | |
| 1997 | Catherine's Grove | starring Jeff Fahey | | |
| 1997 | Dinner at Fred's | | | |
| 1997 | Safehouse | starring Dennis Hopper, Peter Coyote and Chris Sarandon | | |
| 1997 | The Underground | starring Jeff Fahey | | |
| 1997 | Bikini Summer III: South Beach Heat | sequel to Bikini Summer and Bikini Summer II | | |
| 1997 | Heaven Before I Die | starring Giancarlo Giannini and Omar Sharif | | |
| 1997 | Dumb Luck in Vegas | | | |
| Push | starring Jason Jennings | 1998 | Recoil | starring Gary Daniels |
| The Sender | starring Michael Madsen and Robert Vaughn | 1998 | | |
| The Lake | starring Yasmine Bleeth | 1998 | | |
| Little Bigfoot 2: The Journey Home | sequel to Little Bigfoot | 1998 | | |
| Buck and the Magic Bracelet | starring Matt McCoy | 1998 | | |
| Wilbur Falls | starring Sally Kirkland | 1998 | | |
| Land of the Free | starring Jeff Speakman and William Shatner | 1998 | | |
| Extramarital | starring Traci Lords and Jeff Fahey | 1998 | | |
| Anna Nicole Smith: Exposed | documentary starring Anna Nicole Smith | 1998 | | |
| Welcome to Hollywood | mockumentary directed by Adam Rifkin | 1998 | | |
| Renegade Force | aka Counterforce and Rogue Force | 1998 | | |
| Malaika | | 1998 | | |
| The Gardener | aka Garden of Evil starring Malcolm McDowell | 1998 | | |
| Sand Trap | unofficial remake of Inferno | 1998 | | |
| 1999 | When Justice Fails | 1998 | starring Jeff Fahey | |
| 1999 | Can't Stop Dancing | starring Janeane Garofalo | | |
| 1999 | The Long Kill | starring Willie Nelson and Kris Kristofferson | | |
| 1999 | Running Red | starring Jeff Speakman and Angie Everhart | | |
| 1999 | Clubland | starring Lori Petty, directed by Mary Lambert | | |
| 1999 | Undercover Angel | starring Yasmine Bleeth | | |
| 1999 | No Tomorrow | starring Gary Busey, Pam Grier and Gary Daniels | | |
| 1999 | Inferno | starring Jean-Claude van Damme, Danny Trejo and Pat Morita | | |
| 1999 | Avalanche | starring Thomas Ian Griffith, R. Lee Ermey and C. Thomas Howell | | |
| 1999 | Y2K | starring Louis Gossett Jr., Sarah Chalke and Malcolm McDowell | | |
| 1999 | Water Damage | starring Daniel Baldwin and Dean Stockwell | | |
| 2000 | The Spring | starring Kyle MacLachlan | | |
| 2000 | The Stray | starring Michael Madsen and Angie Everhart | | |
| 2000 | The Chaos Factor | starring Fred Ward, R. Lee Ermey, and Kelly Rutherford | | |
| 2000 | Hot Boyz | aka Gang Law | | |
| 2000 | Epicenter | starring Gary Daniels, Traci Lords and Jeff Fahey; Final film produced by Richard Pepin and Joseph Merhi for PM Entertainment. Currently owned by Minerva Pictures | | |
| 2000 | Jailbait | | | |
| 2000 | High Noon | starring Tom Skerritt | | |
| 2000 | Little Heroes 2 | sequel to Little Heroes | | |
| 2000 | Backyard Dogs | starring Bree Turner | | |
| 2001 | Camouflage | starring Leslie Nielsen | | |
| 2001 | The Elite | starring Jurgen Prochnow | | |
| 2001 | Firetrap | starring Dean Cain and Lori Petty | | |
| 2001 | Layover | starring David Hasselhoff | | |
| 2002 | Con Express | starring Arnold Vosloo | | |
| 2002 | Tunnel | starring Daniel Baldwin | | |

== Television programs ==
| Title | Original run | Network | Notes |
|---|---|---|---|
| L.A. Heat | 1996–1999 | TNT | starring Wolf Larson and Steven Williams |
| Hollywood Safari | 1998 | Animal Planet | starring Ted Jan Roberts and Sam J. Jones |
