= List of WildBrain programs =

List of programs produced by Canadian production company

This is a list of programs by WildBrain and its predecessors Decode Entertainment, Halifax Film Company, Studio B Productions, Wildbrain Entertainment, Cookie Jar Group/CINAR, DIC Entertainment, FilmFair, Ragdoll Productions, Epitome Pictures, Nerd Corps Entertainment, Iconix Brand Group, Echo Bridge Home Entertainment, KidsCo, Leucadia Films, and imX Communications.

Note that some shows were co-productions with other companies, and may or may not necessarily be owned by WildBrain.

== Animated series ==
=== WildBrain ===
- Rastamouse (2011–2015) (co-production with Sony Pictures Television International)
- SheZow (2012–2013) (co-production with Kickstart Productions and Moody Street Kids)
- The Doozers (2013–2018) (co-production with The Jim Henson Company)
- Transformers: Rescue Bots (2014–2016) (Seasons 3-4 for Hasbro Studios) (Season 1 was produced by Atomic Cartoons and Darby Pop Productions and Season 2 was produced by Vision Animation and Moody Street Kids)
- Messy Goes to Okido (2015) (co-production with Doodle Productions)
- Kuu Kuu Harajuku (2015–2019) (co-production with Vision Animation and Moody Street Kids)
- Fangbone! (2016–2017) (co-production with Radical Sheep Productions)
- Little People (2016–2018) (co-production with HIT Entertainment and Fisher-Price)
- Rainbow Ruby (2016–2020) (co-production with CJ E&M)
- Spongo, Fuzz & Jalapeña (2019) (co-production with Cheeky Little Productions)
- Denis and Me (2020–present) (short series distributor; produced by Headspinner Productions)
- The Brilliant World of Tom Gates (2021–present) (distributor; produced by TG Entertainment Ltd, Black Camel Pictures and Wild Child Animation)
- Alva's World (2021) (distributor; produced by Kavaleer Productions)
- Summer Memories (2022) (co-production with Aircraft Pictures and Yeti Farm)

==== Halifax Film/DHX Studios Halifax ====
- Poko (2003–2006)
- Lunar Jim (2006-2007)
- Bo on the Go! (2007–2011)
- Animal Mechanicals (2008–2011)
- The Mighty Jungle (2008) (co-production with Decode Entertainment)
- Pirates: Adventures in Art (2010–2011)
- Doozers (2013–2014) (co-production with The Jim Henson Company)
- Inspector Gadget (2015–2018)
- Wishenpoof! (2015)
- Super Why! (2015–2016) (co-production with Out of the Blue Enterprises) (Season 3)
- Space Ranger Roger (2017)

=== WildBrain Studios ===
==== Studio B Productions/DHX Studios Vancouver ====
- Yvon of the Yukon (2000–2004) (co-production with Corus Entertainment)
- What About Mimi? (2000–2002) (co-production with Decode Entertainment)
- D'Myna Leagues (2000–2002) (co-production with CTV)
- Yakkity Yak (2002–2003) (co-production with Kapow Pictures and Nickelodeon Productions)
- Something Else (2003) (co-production with TV-Loonland AG and Family Channel Canada)
- Being Ian (2005–2008) (co-production with Nelvana)
- Class of the Titans (2005–2008) (co-production with Nelvana)
- The Amazing Adrenalini Brothers (2006–2007) (co-production with Bejuba Entertainment and Pesky)
- George of the Jungle (2007–2008) (season 1 only; co-production with DreamWorks Classics)
- Ricky Sprocket: Showbiz Boy (2007–2009) (co-production with Bejuba Entertainment and SnowdenFine Animation)
- Martha Speaks (2008–2014) (co-production with WGBH)
- Kid vs. Kat (2008–2011)
- My Little Pony: Friendship Is Magic (2010–2019) (co-production with Top Draw Animation for Hasbro Studios)
- Pound Puppies (2010–2013) (co-production for Hasbro Studios)
- Littlest Pet Shop (2012–2016) (co-production for Hasbro Studios)
- Packages from Planet X (2013–2014) (co-production with American Greetings)
- Dr. Dimensionpants (2014–2015) (co-production with The Factory Backwards Entertainment)
- Chuck's Choice (2017) (co-production with Corus Entertainment)

==== Nerd Corps Entertainment ====
- Dragon Booster (2004–2006)
- Storm Hawks (2007–2009)
- League of Super Evil (2009–2012)
- Hot Wheels Battle Force 5 (2009–2011)
- Rated A for Awesome (2011–2012)
- Slugterra (2012–2016) (co-produced with Disney XD Canada (now Family Chrgd))
- Monster High (2012–2016) (co-produced with Mattel)
- Max Steel (2013–2016)
- Endangered Species (2015)

=== Wildbrain Entertainment ===
- Space is Dum (1999–2001)
- Poochini (2000–2002) (distributed by Studio 100)
- Yo Gabba Gabba! (2007–2015)
- Team Smithereen (2009–2011)
- The Ricky Gervais Show (2010–2012)
- Bubble Guppies (2011) (season 1; co-production for Nickelodeon Productions)
- UMIGO (2012–2014)

=== CINAR/Cookie Jar Entertainment ===
| Title | Year(s) | Network | Notes |
|---|---|---|---|
| The Adventures of Albert and Sidney | 1986–87 | CBC TV 8 | English dub production |
| Adventures of the Little Koala | 1987 | Nickelodeon | English dub production for Viacom |
| The Wonderful Wizard of Oz | 1987 | HBO | English dub production |
| The World of David the Gnome | 1988 | Nickelodeon | English dub production; co-produced with BRB Internacional (current owner) and Miramax Films |
| The Smoggies | 1989–90 | Canwest Global System/Télévision de Radio-Canada (Canada); Antenne 2 (France) | |
| C.L.Y.D.E. | 1991 | Family Channel | co-produced with France Animation |
| Young Robin Hood | 1991–92 | Syndication | co-produced with Hanna-Barbera and France Animation |
| A Bunch of Munsch | 1991–92 | CTV (Canada); Showtime (US) | |
| The Legend of White Fang | 1992 | Family Channel (Canada); TF1 (France) | |
| Papa Beaver's Storytime | 1993–95 | Canal J/France 3 (France); Nick Jr. (US) | co-produced with France Animation |
| The Busy World of Richard Scarry | 1994–97 | Family Channel (Canada); Showtime/Nick Jr. (US) | co-produced with France Animation and Paramount Television |
| Robinson Sucroe | 1994–95 | Canal+ (France); Family Channel/Canal Famille (Canada) | co-produced with France Animation |
| Albert the Fifth Musketeer | 1994 | Children's BBC (UK); Canal+ (France) | co-produced with France Animation and Ravensburger Film + TV |
| Cat Tales | 1994–95 | Canal+ (France); Télévision de Radio-Canada (Canada) | co-produced with France Animation |
| The Little Lulu Show | 1995–99 | CTV/Family Channel (Canada); HBO (US) | co-produced with Golden Books Family Entertainment, Beta Film, and TMO-Loonland Film (season 3) |
| The Babaloos; The Babaloos on Vacation | 1996; 1999 | France 3 (France); TVOKids/CBC Television (Canada) | co-produced with France Animation and Ravensburger Film + TV |
| Night Hood | 1996 | YTV (Canada); Canal+ (France) | co-produced with France Animation |
| Arthur | 1996–2022 | PBS Kids | co-produced with WGBH Boston (seasons 1-15) |
| Dr. Xargle | 1997 | CITV | co-produced with King Rollo Films |
| The Wombles | 1997–2000 | CITV | co-produced with CINAR Europe, FilmFair and United Film & Television Productions/HTV Wales |
| Caillou | 1997–2002; 2006; 2010–11 | Teletoon (seasons 1-4); Treehouse (season 5) | co-produced with Clockwork Zoo (season 5) |
| Ivanhoë - The King's Knight | 1997 | Teletoon | co-produced with France Animation |
| Patrol 03 | 1997 | Teletoon (Canada); France 3 (France) | co-produced with France Animation |
| Animal Crackers | 1997–2000 | Teletoon (Canada); La Cinquième (France) | co-produced with Alphanim |
| The Adventures of Paddington Bear | 1997–2000 | Teletoon (Canada); Canal J/TF1 (France); CITV (UK; seasons 1-2) | co-produced with CINAR Europe and Protecrea |
| The Country Mouse and the City Mouse Adventures | 1998–99 | TVOKids/Télévision de Radio-Canada/YTV (Canada); HBO (US); France 3 (France) | co-produced with WIC Entertainment, France Animation, and Ravensburger Film + TV |
| Journey to the West: Legends of the Monkey King | 1998–2000 | Teletoon (Canada); CCTV (China) | |
| Mumble Bumble | 1999–2000 | CBC Television | co-produced with Egmont Imagination |
| Ripley's Believe It or Not!: The Animated Series | 1999 | France 3 (France); Family Channel (Canada) | co-produced with Ripley Entertainment, United Media, and Alphanim |
| Mona the Vampire | 1999–2004 | YTV (Canada); France 3/Canal J/Tiji (seasons 3-4) (France) | co-produced with Alphanim and Farnham Film Company |
| Flight Squad | 1999–2000 | M6 (France); Teletoon (Canada) | co-produced with Antéfilms and Neuroplanet |
| The Baskervilles | 2000 | Teletoon (Canada); France 2 (France); CITV (UK) | co-produced with Alphanim and Blue Nose Productions |
| A Miss Mallard Mystery | 2000–01 | Teletoon (Canada); Shanghai Oriental TV (China) | co-produced with Shanghai Animation Film Studio |
| Treasure | 2000–01 | BBC Two (UK); YTV (Canada) | co-produced with BBC Bristol and Halo Productions |
| The Twins | 2000 | YTV | co-produced with Flextech |
| The Upstairs Downstairs Bears | 2001 | Teletoon (Canada); CITV (UK) | co-produced with CINAR Europe, FilmFair, Egmont Imagination and Scottish Television |
| Simon in the Land of Chalk Drawings | 2002 | Teletoon (Canada); Shanghai Oriental TV (China) | co-produced with Shanghai Animation Film Studio |
| Potatoes and Dragons | 2004 | Canal J/France 3 (France); Teletoon (Canada) | co-produced with Alphanim and Europool |
| Creepschool | 2004 | France 3 (France); Teletoon (Canada) | co-produced with Alphanim and Happy Life |
| Postcards from Buster | 2004–08 | PBS Kids | co-produced with WGBH Boston and Marc Brown Studios |
| Gerald McBoing-Boing | 2005–07 | Teletoon (Canada); Cartoon Network (US) | co-produced with Classic Media |
| Johnny Test | 2005–14 | Kids' WB/Cartoon Network (US); Teletoon (Canada) | continued from Warner Bros. Animation |
| Spider Riders | 2006–07 | TV Tokyo (Japan); Teletoon (Canada) | co-produced with Bee Train |
| Magi-Nation | 2007–08 | Kids' WB (US); Kids' CBC (Canada) | co-produced with Daewon Media |
| Busytown Mysteries | 2007–10 | Kids' CBC | |
| Will and Dewitt | 2007–08 | Kids' WB | |
| World of Quest | 2008–09 | Kids' WB (US; season 1); Teletoon (Canada) | |
| The New Adventures of Nanoboy | 2008–10 | | co-produced with Scrawl Studios and AGOGO Media |
| Kung Fu Dino Posse | 2009–11 | KBS1 (South Korea); YTV (Canada) | co-produced with Sunwoo Entertainment, Sunwoo Asia-Pacific, and Optix Entertainment |
| Noonbory and the Super Seven | 2009 | EBS (South Korea); Knowledge Network/Access/SCN (Canada); CBS (US) | co-produced with Daewon Media |
| Doodlebops Rockin' Road Show | 2010 | Kids' CBC (Canada); CBS (US) | co-produced with Optix Entertainment and Illusion Studios |
| Scan2Go | 2010–11 | SBS | North America/South America distribution |
| MetaJets | 2010 | Teletoon | co-produced with Sunwoo Entertainment |
| Mudpit | 2012–13 | Teletoon | |
| Ella the Elephant | 2013–14 | TVOKids | co-produced with FremantleMedia Kids & Family |

=== Ragdoll Productions ===
- Tronji (2009–2010)
- The Adventures of Abney & Teal (2011–2012)
- Dipdap (2011–2013)
- Twirlywoos (2015–2017)

=== AAC Kids ===
| Title | Original run | Network | Notes |
|---|---|---|---|
| Beast Wars: Transformers | 1996–99 | YTV | continued from Alliance; co-produced with Mainframe Entertainment |
| Captain Star | 1997–98 | CITV (UK); Teletoon (Canada) | distributed by Alliance; produced by Cosgrove Hall Films and HTV |
| Hoze Houndz | 1999–2002 | Family Channel | co-produced with Amberwood Entertainment |
| Yvon of the Yukon | 2000–04 | YTV | seasons 1–2; co-produced with Studio B Productions |
| Pumper Pups | 2000 | Treehouse TV | co-produced with Amberwood Entertainment |
| Henry's World | 2001–04 | Family Channel | co-produced with TV-Loonland AG and Cuppa Coffee Animation |
| Old Tom | 2002 | ABC | co-produced with Yoram Gross-EM.TV and Millimages |
| Connie the Cow | 2003–05 | TV3 (Catalonia); Noggin (US) | co-produced with Neptuno Films |
| Poko | 2003–06 | Kids' CBC | co-produced with Eraser Dog Prods., Salter Street Films (season 1), and Halifax Film (season 2) |
| Dragon Booster | 2004–06 | Kids' CBC | co-produced with Apollo Screen, Nerd Corps Entertainment and The Story Hat |
| Lunar Jim | 2006–07 | Kids' CBC | co-produced with Halifax Film Company |

=== Mattel Television ===
- Fireman Sam (1987–1994; 2005–present)
- Bob the Builder (1999–2011)
- Little People (1999–2002, 2004–2005) (co-produced by Egmont Imagination, Cuppa Coffee Studios, and Wreckless Abandon Studios)
- Polly Pocket (2010–2018)
- Bob the Builder (2015) (2015–2018)

=== Iconix Brand Group ===
- The Charlie Brown and Snoopy Show (1983–1985) (produced by Lee Mendelson/Bill Melendez Productions)
- This Is America, Charlie Brown (1988–1989) (produced by Lee Mendelson/Bill Melendez Productions)
- Strawberry Shortcake (2003–2008) (produced by DIC Entertainment and American Greetings)
- Strawberry Shortcake's Berry Bitty Adventures (2010–2015) (co-production with MoonScoop Group and American Greetings)

== Live-action series ==
=== WildBrain ===
- Satisfaction (2013) (co-production with Bell Media and Lionsgate)
- Topsy and Tim (2013–2015)
- Hank Zipzer (2014–2016) (co-production with Walker Productions and Kindle Entertainment)
- Teletubbies (2015–2018)
- Playdate (2015) (co-production with Sinking Ship Entertainment)
- Backstage (2016–2017) (co-production with Fresh TV)
- Airmageddon (2016) (UK production for CBBC)
- We Are Savvy (2016–2018)
- Creeped Out (2017–2019) (UK production for CBBC)
- Massive Monster Mayhem (2017)
- Waffle the Wonder Dog (2018–present)
- Bajillionaires (2019)
- I Woke Up a Vampire (2023)

==== Decode Entertainment/WildBrain Studios Toronto ====
- Brats of the Lost Nebula (1998-1999) (co-production with Jim Henson Productions)
- Our Hero (2000–2002) (co-production with Heroic Film Company)
- The Zack Files (2000–2002)
- The Hoobs (2001–2002) (co-production with The Jim Henson Company)
- Be the Creature (2003–2004)
- Radio Free Roscoe (2003)
- Naturally, Sadie (2005–2007)
- The Adrenaline Project (2007–2008) (co-production with YTV)
- The Latest Buzz (2007–2010)
- Grandpa in My Pocket (2009, Season 1 distribution only)
- Waybuloo (2009–2014) (co-production with The Foundation)
- How to Be Indie (2009–2011) (co-production with Heroic Film Company and YTV)
- Make It Pop (2015–2016) (co-production with Tom Lynch Company, N'Credible Entertainment, and Nickelodeon)
- The Other Kingdom (2016) (co-production with Tom Lynch Company and Nickelodeon)

==== Halifax Film/DHX Studios Halifax ====
- This Hour Has 22 Minutes (2005–present)
- North/South (2006)
- The Guard (2008–2009)
- That's So Weird! (2009–2012)

=== Wildbrain Entertainment/DHX Los Angeles ===
- Yo Gabba Gabba! (2007–2015)

=== CINAR/Cookie Jar Entertainment ===
| Title | Year(s) | Network | Notes |
|---|---|---|---|
| Ultra 7 | 1985 | TNT | English dub production for Turner Program Services |
| Happy Castle | 1989 | Family Channel | |
| The Intrepids | 1992–95 | Canal Famille/Télévision de Radio-Canada; France 3 (France) | co-produced with Marathon Productions |
| Are You Afraid of the Dark? | 1992–96; 1999–2000 | Family Channel/YTV (Canada); Nickelodeon (US) | |
| Wimzie's House | 1995–96 | Télévision de Radio-Canada; CBC Television | |
| Space Cases | 1996–98 | Nickelodeon | |
| The Mystery Files of Shelby Woo | 1996–99 | Nickelodeon | season 4 co-produced with Out of My Mind Productions and Nickelodeon; WildBrain distributes the full series |
| Lassie | 1997–99 | YTV (Canada); Animal Planet (US) | co-produced with Golden Books Family Entertainment and PolyGram Filmed Entertainment |
| Emily of New Moon | 1998–2000 | CBC Television | co-produced with WIC Entertainment and Salter Street Films |
| Zoboomafoo | 1999–2001 | PBS Kids | co-produced with Earth Creatures and Maryland Public Television |
| Sci-Squad | 1999–2000 | TVOKids/Knowledge Network (Canada); Discovery Kids (US) | |
| Dark Oracle | 2004–06 | YTV | co-produced with Shaftesbury Films |
| The Doodlebops | 2005–07 | Kids' CBC | |
| Debra! | 2011–12 | Family | |
| Deadtime Stories | 2012–14 | Nickelodeon | |

=== Ragdoll Productions ===
- Rosie and Jim (1990–2000)
- Brum (1991–2002)
- Open a Door (1992)
- Tots TV (1993–1998)
- Tots Video (1997)
- Teletubbies (1997–2001)
- Teletubbies Everywhere (2002)
- Boohbah (2003–2006)
- Blips (2005–2006)
- In the Night Garden... (2007–2009)

=== Epitome Pictures ===
| Title | Year(s) | Network | Notes |
|---|---|---|---|
| The Kids of Degrassi Street | 1979–1986 | CBC Television | |
| Degrassi Junior High | 1987–89 | CBC (Canada); PBS (US) | |
| Degrassi High | 1989–91 | CBC (Canada); PBS (US) | |
| Degrassi Talks | 1992 | CBC | |
| Liberty Street | 1995 | CBC | |
| Degrassi: The Next Generation | 2001–15 | CTV/MuchMusic/MTV | co-produced with Bell Media distributed by AAC Kids/Echo Bridge Entertainment |
| Instant Star | 2004–08 | CTV (Canada); The N (US) | distributed by AAC Kids |
| The L.A. Complex | 2012 | MuchMusic (Canada); The CW (US) | distributed by Echo Bridge Entertainment |
| Open Heart | 2015 | YTV (Canada); TeenNick (US) | co-produced with marblemedia |
| Degrassi: Next Class | 2016–17 | Family | |

=== Echo Bridge Entertainment ===
| Title | Original run | Network | Notes |
|---|---|---|---|
| Hollywood Safari | 1997–98 | Animal Planet | produced by PM Entertainment |

AAC Kids

| Title | Original run | Network | Notes |
|---|---|---|---|
| Magic Hour | 1989–90 | CBC Television | produced by Atlantis Films "High Country", "Pray for Me, Paul Henderson", "The Fighter", "The Prom", and "Tom Alone" episodes owned by WildBrain |
| African Journey | 1990 | PBS | produced by Atlantis Films and Long Cloud Productions |
| Maniac Mansion | 1990–93 | YTV (Canada); The Family Channel (US) | produced by Atlantis Films and Lucasfilm Television |
| The Odyssey | 1992–94 | CBC Television | distribution; produced by Omni Film Productions and Water Street Pictures |
| Wild Side Show | 1992–94 | Nickelodeon | produced by Atlantis Films and Safari Productions, Inc. |
| African Skies | 1992–94 | The Family Channel | produced by Atlantis Films and Franklin/Waterman Entertainment |
| White Fang | 1993–94 | BBS | produced by Atlantis Films and South Pacific Pictures |
| The Mighty Jungle | 1994 | The Family Channel | produced by Alliance, Le Sabre, Goodman/Rosen Productions, and TriStar Television |
| Squawk Box | 1994 | YTV | produced by Atlantis Films |
| Once Upon A Hamster | 1995–97 | YTV | distribution; produced by Hammytime Productions |
| Star Runner | 1995 | Global | part of the Atlantis Family Playhouse series produced by Atlantis Films and South Pacific Pictures |
| Mysterious Island | 1995 | Family Channel | produced by Atlantis Films and Tasman Film & Television Ltd. |
| My Life as a Dog | 1996–97 | Showtime | produced by Atlantis Films and Credo Entertainment |
| Straight Up | 1996–98 | CBC | produced by Alliance and Back Alley Film Productions |
| Mirror, Mirror II | 1997–98 | Network Ten | distributed by Alliance; produced by Millennium Pictures and The Gibson Group |
| El Mundo del Lundo | 1997–98 | The Comedy Network | produced by Salter Street Films |
| Mowgli: The New Adventures of the Jungle Book | 1998 | Fox Kids | produced by Alliance, Wolfcrest Entertainment, and Franklin/Waterman Worldwide |
| Daily Tips for Modern Living | 1998 | CBC | produced by Salter Street Films |
| Legacy | 1998–99 | UPN | |
| Emily of New Moon | 1998–2000 | CBC | produced by Salter Street Films, CINAR Corporation and WIC Entertainment |
| The Mrs. Greenthumbs Show | 1998–2000 | Life Network | produced by Salter Street Films |
| The Famous Jett Jackson | 1998–2001 | Disney Channel | co-produced with JP Kids and TV-Loonland AG |
| I Was a Sixth Grade Alien! | 1999–2001 | YTV | co-produced with Winklemania Productions |
| The Awful Truth | 1999–2000 | Bravo | produced by Salter Street Films and Dog Eat Dog Films |
| Pirates! | 1999–2001 | Treehouse TV | produced by Salter Street Films |
| In a Heartbeat | 2000–01 | Family (Canada); Disney Channel (US) | |
| The Itch | 2000 | The Comedy Network | produced by Salter Street Films |
| Blackfly | 2001–02 | Global | produced by Salter Street Films |
| Ace Lightning | 2002–05 | CBBC (UK); BBC Kids (Canada) | co-produced with BBC |
| Mental Block | 2003–05 | YTV | distributor; produced by Zone 3 |

=== Jay Ward Productions ===
- Fractured Flickers (1962–1964)

== Specials ==
=== CINAR/Cookie Jar Entertainment ===
- The Wonderful Wizard of Oz (compilation films based on 1986 anime)
  - The Wonderful Wizard of Oz (1987)
  - The Marvelous Land of Oz (1987)
  - Ozma of Oz (1987)
  - The Emerald City of Oz (1987)
- Madeline (television specials) (1988–1991) (co-produced by DIC Entertainment for the original special, and France Animation for the remaining five specials)
  - Madeline (April 9, 1988)
  - Madeline's Christmas (December 25, 1990)
  - Madeline and the Bad Hat (August 11, 1991)
  - Madeline and the Gypsies (September 25, 1991)
  - Madeline's Rescue (October 18, 1991)
  - Madeline in London (November 28, 1991)
- The Real Story of... (co-produced by France Animation)
  - The Real Story of Humpty Dumpty (July 18, 1990)
  - The Real Story of the Three Little Kittens (December 15, 1990)
  - The Real Story of Itsy Bitsy Spider (October 16, 1991)
  - The Real Story of O Christmas Tree (December 21, 1991)
  - The Real Story of Happy Birthday to You (January 4, 1992)
  - The Real Story of Twinkle Twinkle Little Star (1992)
  - The Real Story of Au Clair de La Lune (1992)
- A Gift of Munsch (1994)
- The Sleep Room (two part miniseries; 1998) (co-produced by Alpha Media)
- Sparky N'Arfman (1999; pilot for Nick Jr.)
- Arthur (1996–2022)
  - Arthur's Perfect Christmas (2000, co-produced by WGBH Educational Foundation)
  - Arthur, It's Only Rock and Roll (2002, co-produced by WGBH Educational Foundation)
- Caillou's Holiday Movie (2003)

=== Ragdoll Productions ===
- Badjelly the Witch (2000)

=== Echo Bridge Entertainment ===
- Roxanne's Best Christmas Ever (1999)

AAC Kids

- Boys and Girls (1983)
- The Bamboo Brush (1984)
- I Know a Secret (1984)
- The Cutaway (1992)
- Celtic Electric (1998)
- Talking to Americans (2001)

=== WildBrain ===
- Sara Solves It (2015) (co-production with WGBH Educational Foundation and Out of the Blue Enterprises)
- Bob's Broken Sleigh (2015) (co-produced by Eh-Okay Entertainment)
- Ghost Patrol (2016)

== Films ==
=== WildBrain ===
- My Little Pony: Equestria Girls (2013) (co-production with Hasbro Studios)
- Hamlet & Hutch (2013)
- My Little Pony: Equestria Girls – Rainbow Rocks (2014) (co-production with Hasbro Studios)
- Across the Line (2015)
- My Little Pony: Equestria Girls – Friendship Games (2015) (co-production with Hasbro Studios)
- Full Out (2016)
- My Little Pony: Equestria Girls – Legend of Everfree (2016) (co-production with Hasbro Studios)
- My Little Pony: Equestria Girls TV specials (2017) (co-production with Hasbro Studios)
- My Little Pony: The Movie (2017) (co-production with Allspark Pictures, Distributed by Lionsgate)

=== WildBrain (original)/DHX Los Angeles ===
- Out In Space (1997)
- Humanstein (1998)
- A Dog Cartoon (1998)
- Hubert's Brain (2001)

=== CINAR/Cookie Jar Entertainment ===
- Hockey Night (1984)
- Letters from a Dead Man (1986) (English version)
- John the Fearless (1987)
- Cat City (1987)
- The Treasure of Swamp Castle (1988)
- Train Mice (1989)
- The Great Cheese Conspiracy (1991)
- Million Dollar Babies (1994)
- Bonjour Timothy (1995)
- Wish Upon a Star (1996)
- The Best Bad Thing (1997)
- The Whole of the Moon (1997)
- Ghost of Dickens' Past (1998)
- A Winter of Turmoil (Un Hiver de Tourmente) (1998) (co-produced with Image & Compagnie)
- Sally Marshall Is Not an Alien (1999)
- Heart: The Marilyn Bell Story (1999)
- Revenge of the Land (1999)
- Who Gets the House? (1999)
- Kayla (1999)
- Ivor the Invisible (2001)
- Both Sides of the Law (2001)

=== Epitome Pictures ===
- School's Out (1992)
- Degrassi Goes Hollywood (2009)
- Degrassi Takes Manhattan (2010)

=== Echo Bridge Entertainment ===
- Magic Kid (1993)
- Bigfoot: The Unforgettable Encounter (1994)
- Magic Kid 2 (1994)
- The Power Within (1995)
- Two Bits & Pepper (1995)
- Earth Minus Zero (1996)
- My Uncle the Alien (1996)
- Tiger Heart (1996)
- Hollywood Safari (1997)
- Little Bigfoot (1997)
- Little Bigfoot 2: The Journey Home (1998)
- Secret of the Andes (1998)
- Undercover Angel (1999)
- When Zachary Beaver Came to Town (2003)

AAC Kids

- Wild Horse Hank (1979)
- The War Boy (1985)
- A Child's Christmas in Wales (1987)
- Clarence (1990)
- Star Runner (1990)
- The Girl from Mars (1991)
- Alligator Pie (1991)
- Heck's Way Home (1995)
- Saltwater Moose (1996)
- Northern Lights (1997)
- The Girl with Brains in Her Feet (1997)
- Ms. Bear (1997)
- Mowgli's First Adventure: In Search of the Elephant Eye Diamond (1998)
- Emma's Wish (1998)
- New Waterford Girl (1999)
- Jett Jackson: The Movie (2001)
- Confessions of an Ugly Stepsister (2001)
- Bowling for Columbine (2002)
- The Man Who Saved Christmas (2002)

=== Nerd Corps Entertainment/WildBrain Studios Vancouver ===
- Slugterra: Ghoul from Beyond (2014) (Co-produced with Disney XD Canada)
- Slugterra: Return of the Elementals (2014) (Co-produced with Disney XD Canada, Shout Factory, Screenvision and Cineplex)
- Slugterra: Slug Fu Showdown (2015) (Co-produced with Disney XD Canada)
- Slugterra: Eastern Caverns (2015) (Co-produced with Disney XD Canada)
- Slugterra: Into The Shadows (2016) (Co-produced with Family Chrgd)

=== Mattel Television ===
- Polly Pocket: Lunar Eclipse (2003)
- Polly Pocket: 2 Cool at the Pocket Plaza (2005)
- PollyWorld (2006)
- Rainbow Magic: Return to Rainspell Island (2010)

=== Iconix Brand Group ===
- Strawberry Shortcake: The Sweet Dreams Movie (2006)
- The Strawberry Shortcake Movie: Sky's the Limit (2009)
