= L.A. Heat =

L.A. Heat may refer to:

- L.A. Heat (TV series), a television show filmed from 1996 to 1998
- L.A. Heat (film), a 1989 movie
