= Bob Orrison =

American stunt performer

- Born: July 28, 1928
- Died: October 11, 2014 (aged 86)

Robert P. Orrison (July 28, 1928 – October 11, 2014) was an American film and television stunt performer.

He was the stunt double for actor Audie Murphy for many films and did stunt work in John Wayne movies such as The Undefeated and Chisum. He also performed stunts in such films as The Wild Bunch, Smokey and the Bandit, Rambo III, Days of Thunder, Die Hard 2, and Speed. For television, he worked on the original Star Trek series doubling for Leonard Nimoy and DeForest Kelley on several occasions. He was the primary stunt driver of the General Lee car on The Dukes of Hazzard, and doubled for George Peppard in stunts performed for The A-Team.

On October 11, 2014, Orrison and his friend and fellow retired stuntman, Gary McLarty, were killed in a traffic collision in Rancho Cordova, California, where Orrison had lived since 2007. He was 86.

== Filmography ==
Year	Title	Role	Notes
1968	5 Card Stud	Pete	Uncredited
1972	The Culpepper Cattle Co.	Rutter	
1975	Mitchell	Mistretta Hood #1	
1978	Convoy	Officer Bob Bookman	
1978	Zero to Sixty		
1979	Sunburn	Milan	
1980	Tom Horn	Matt	
1988	Bulletproof	Guerilla #2	
1994	Bigfoot: The Unforgettable Encounter	Joe Perkins	
1995	Two Bits & Pepper	Cowboy #3	
