= Deron McBee =

American actor and sportsman (born 1960)

- Born: August 23, 1960 (age 66); Los Angeles, California, United States
- Years active: 1988–2013
- Spouse(s): Drzan McBee (Died March 20, 2003); 2 children

Deron Michael McBee (born August 23, 1960) is an American actor and sportsman, known for playing Motaro in Mortal Kombat Annihilation and as Malibu on American Gladiators.

== Career ==
Deron McBee toured the professional racquetball circuit for three years.

McBee was an original Gladiator on American Gladiators, performing under the name Malibu. McBee appeared for one season on the show and returning several years later for the live tour. McBee is known for (as Malibu) his blond hair, tanned skin, and surfer persona.

McBee has trained in karate at the Billy Blanks World Karate Studio, and hand-to-hand combat and swordsmanship with Anthony De Longis.

As an actor, McBee has generally been cast in action movies, usually in roles which allow him to use his fighting skills to portray a villain.

His most notable film role is that of Motaro in the second Mortal Kombat film, Mortal Kombat Annihilation. In the DVD extras of The Killing Zone, McBee states that he has produced his impressive physique by abstaining from steroids and using a combination of prayer and faith.

In addition to film, McBee has had many guest starring roles on television.

McBee also worked as a professional wrestler in 1990 for Five Star Wrestling in Baton Rouge operated by Grizzly Smith.

McBee was a deputy sheriff with the Los Angeles County Sheriff's Department in the early 1980s.

== Personal life ==
Deron was married to Drzan McBee (née Ashford), a former professional wrestler and Raiderette, who died in 2003 from a heart attack. She was survived by her two daughters. Deron is now mostly involved in Christian ministry and in pursuing his painting passion.

== Filmography ==
=== Films ===
Year	Film	Role	Director	Notes
1987	Tall Dark & Handsome	Chippendales Dancer	Jane Ballard	Direct-to-video release
1988	Elvira: Mistress of the Dark	Las Vegas Muscle Man	James Signorelli	
1990	Payback	Taylor	Addison Randall	Direct-to-video release
1990	Chinatown Connection	Martial Artist	Jean-Paul Ouellette	
1990	Time Barbarians	Doran	Joseph John Barmettler	Direct-to-video release. Credited as Deron Michael McBee
1991	The Killing Zone	Garrett Bodine	Addison Randall	Direct-to-video release
1992	Valhalla	Siegfried; Nick	Jonathan D. Gift	
1992	Out for Blood	Bodyguard #1	Richard W. Munchkin	Direct-to-video release
1993	Falling Down	Man at Pier	Joel Schumacher	Uncredited role
1993	Dragonstrike	Warrior	Flint Dille	Short film
1994	Ring of Steel	Big Fighter	David Frost	Direct-to-video release
1994	Immortal Combat	Muller	Dan Neira	Direct-to-video release
1994	T-Force	Zeus	Richard Pepin	Direct-to-video release
1994	Cage II: The Arena of Death	Spike Duval	Lang Elliott	Direct-to-video release
1995	Batman Forever	Harvey's Thug	Joel Schumacher	Uncredited role
1995	Enter the Blood Ring	Gregor	Tom Oliver	Credited as "Malibu", the name he used as a competitor on the TV series American Gladiators; see below.
1995	Raging Angels	Archangel Gabriel	Alan Smithee	Uncredited role
1995	Monster Mash: The Movie	The Monster	Joel Cohen and Alec Sokolow	Direct-to-video release
1996	Skyscraper	Leidermeier	Raymond Martino	Direct-to-video release
1997	Batman & Robin	Hockey Thug	Joel Schumacher	Uncredited role
1997	Mortal Kombat Annihilation	Motaro	John R. Leonetti	
2001	Instinct to Kill	Des	Gustavo Graef Marino	
2003	M.V.P.	The Stranger	Alex Daniels	Short film
2003	Red Serpent	Albert Hakimov	Gino Tanasescu	Direct-to-video release
2004	Latin Dragon	Mad Dog	Scott Thomas	Direct-to-video release
2005	The Cutter	Alex; Repairman	Bill Tannen	Direct-to-video release
2007	Revamped	Kahn	Jeff Rector	Direct-to-video release
2008	Welcome to Sundown	Lord Tsuric	Ian Eyre	Short film
2012	Redemption	Darion	Vincent McLean	Short film
2026	Blood Hunter: Thirst and Rage	Petrov	Devon Nicholson	Short film

=== Television ===
Year(s)	Title	Role(s)	Notes
1989	Married... with Children	Policeman	S3E6 "Her Cups Runneth Over"
1989–1990	American Gladiators	Malibu	13 episodes. Appearance in S1E13 "First Half Highlight Show" is archive footage only.
1990	In Living Color	Viking	S2E2 "Anton at the Recruiter"; S2E12 "Veracosa". Not officially credited in either episode.
1990	Guys Next Door	Conan the Librarian	S1E11 "Patrick Disappears"
1991	Visitors from the Unknown	Nordic Alien	TV movie
1992	The Young and the Restless	Stud #2	Episode #4769
1994	M.A.N.T.I.S.	VR Soldier	S1E5 "Soldier of Misfortune"
1994	Monster Wars	Equalizer	
1995	Cybill	Waiter	S1E6 "Call Me Irresponsible". Credited as Deron Michael McBee
1996	Night Stand with Dick Dietrick	Zach	S1E28 "Are Talk Shows Out of Control?"
1996	Baywatch Nights	Muscle Man	S2E2 "The Creature"
1997	Sliders	Ceres	S3E25 "This Slide of Paradise". Credited as Deron Michael McBee
1998	Conan the Adventurer	Sinjin	S1E16 "The Child"
1998	Martial Law	Kyle	S1E11 "Lock-Up"
1999	L.A. Doctors	Dave	S1E22 "Que Sera, Sarah"
2000	Roswell	Wrestler	S1E13 "The Convention". Credited as Deron Michael McBee
2000	Walker, Texas Ranger	Luke Warley	S8E18 "Black Dragon". Credited as Deron Michael McBee
2000	Guilty as Charged	Cletus	TV movie
2001	The Invisible Man	Mandeville	S2E8 "Den of Thieves"
2001	Curb Your Enthusiasm	Thor	S2E2 "Thor". Credited as Deron Michael McBee
2001	Nikki	New Crybaby	S2E4 "Superhero Blues"
2002	Strong Medicine	The Winged Wonder	S3E3 "Stages"
2004	Veronica Mars	Hank "Ziggy" Zigman	S1E5 "You Think You Know Somebody". Credited as Deron Michael McBee
2011	Tosh.0	Self	S3E8 "Foul Ball Couple". Credited as "Malibu", the name he used as a competitor on the TV series American Gladiators; see above.
2022	Superficially Deep	Daniel	S1E9 "That's the Objective"
2023	30 for 30	Self	S4E28 "The American Gladiators Documentary" and S4E29 "The American Gladiators Documentary: Part Two". Credited as "Malibu", the name he used as a competitor on the namesake TV series.
2023	Inside Edition	Self	S35E193 "Prince Harry Takes the Stand"
2023	Muscles & Mayhem: An Unauthorized Story of American Gladiators	Self	S1E2 "Let the Games Begin". Credited as "Malibu", the name he used as a competitor on the namesake TV series that is the subject of this documentary miniseries.

=== Video games ===
Year	Title	Role	Notes
1995	Terror T.R.A.X.: Track of the Vampire	Officer Phil Graves	
