= Rif Hutton =

American actor (1955–2026)

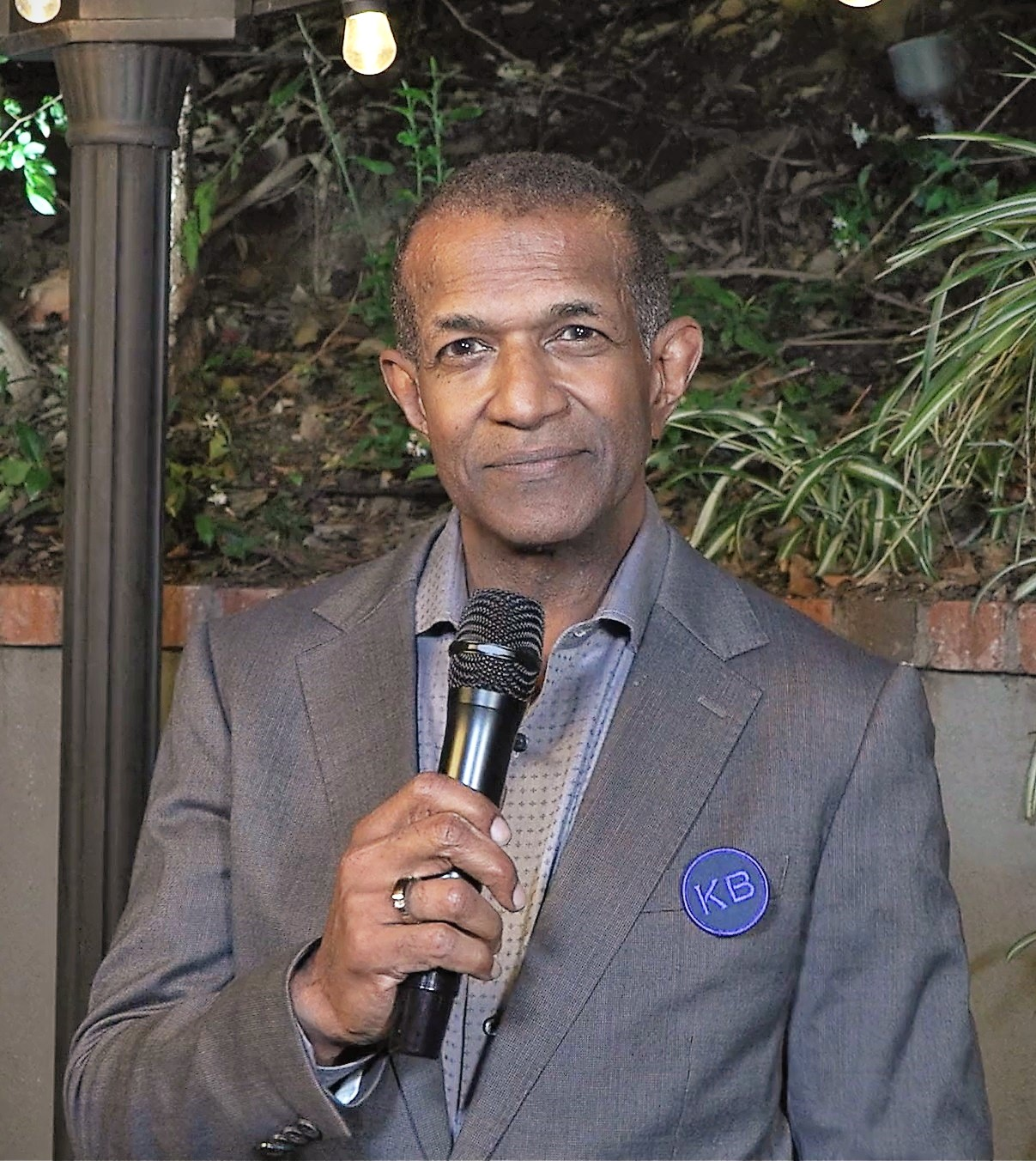
- Hutton at the Kirk Baily celebration of life in 2022
- Born: November 28, 1952; San Antonio, Texas, U.S.
- Died: April 18, 2026 (aged 73); Pasadena, California, U.S.
- Occupation: Actor
- Years active: 1983–2026
- Spouse: Bridget Hoffman (m. 2001)

Rif Hutton (November 28, 1952 – April 18, 2026) was an American actor. He is perhaps best known for his roles as Dr. Ron Welch in the comedy-drama series Doogie Howser, M.D., appearing in that series from 1990 up to its conclusion in 1993 and Mr. Green in Fudge (TV series). From 1997 to 2001, he appeared in a recurring role as Lt. Cmdr. Alan Mattoni on the series JAG. Hutton is also notable for playing Russ Beeler, a fictional owner of a KFC establishment, appearing in a number of KFC commercials in the early to mid 1990s.

== Early life and career ==
Hutton was born in San Antonio, Texas, and was raised in East Orange, New Jersey. He moved to Los Angeles in the mid-1970s to pursue an acting career. He went to many auditions in his early years, but soon found himself broke and homeless, getting assistance from friends.

He went on to guest star in a number of notable television series including The Jeffersons, Night Court, L.A. Law, Married... with Children, Hunter, Wings, Murphy Brown, The Larry Sanders Show, Getting By, Lois & Clark: The New Adventures of Superman, Family Matters, and Cold Case among others.

Hutton also appeared in stage productions in the Los Angeles area as well as working as a voice actor.

== Personal life and death ==
Hutton was married twice. His first marriage was to a woman named Pat, an actress and stand-up comedian. His second was to actress Bridget Hoffman in 2001.

It is also reported in 2000 that he was engaged to actress Telma Hopkins. In 1993–94, Hutton had played Hopkins' love interest in a few episodes of her sitcom Getting By.

Hutton died from brain cancer at his home in Pasadena, California, on April 18, 2026, at the age of 73.

== Filmography ==
Rif Hutton's film appearances
Year	Title	Role	Ref.
1983	Wavelength	Air Force officer	
1987	Wanted: Dead or Alive	Agent	
1987	You Talkin' to Me?	Black man	
1988	Moving	Reporter	
1988	Stand and Deliver	Pearson	
1989	L.A. Heat	Det. Royster	
1991	The Borrower	Newscaster	
1991	Going Under	Dr. Friendly	
1994	Star Trek Generations	Klingon guard	
1995	Bigfoot: The Unforgettable Encounter	Jess	
1995	Children of the Corn III: Urban Harvest	Arnold	
1999	Restraining Order	Sidney Evans	
1999	The Thirteenth Floor	Joe	
2001	Shrek	Lord Farquaad's guards (voice)	
2001	Osmosis Jones	Charlie (voice)	
2004	Gas	Brad	
2004	Shark Tale	Fish (voice)	
2005	Tugger: The Jeep 4x4 Who Wanted to Fly	Crewman #1 (voice)	
2005	Madagascar	Crowd Member (voice)	
2006	Stick It	Drill Sergeant	
2006	Curious George	Mailman (voice)	
2008	The Tale of Despereaux	Man in crowd (voice)	
2008	My Apocalypse	Housing Inspector	
2009	Astro Boy	Metro City Sergeant (voice)	
2009	The Princess and the Frog	DJ (voice)	
2011	Rio	Additional Voices (voice)	
2012	Hotel Transylvania	Additional Voices (voice)	
2012	ParaNorman	Blithe Hollow Townperson (voice)	
2013	Epic	Additional Voices (voice)	
2014	Rio 2	Additional Voices (voice)	
2016	Ice Age: Collision Course	Additional Voices (voice)	
2016	Kingsglaive: Final Fantasy XV	High Official #2 (voice)	
2017	The Star	Additional Voices (voice)	
2018	Spider-Man: Into the Spider-Verse	Additional Voices (voice)	
2018	Hotel Transylvania 3: Summer Vacation	Additional Voices (voice)	
2019	The Angry Birds Movie 2	Additional Voices (voice)	
2022	Paws of Fury: The Legend of Hank	Additional Voices (voice)	

Rif Hutton's television appearances
Year	Title	Role	Notes	Ref.
1985	The Jeffersons	Roulette Spinner		
1986	Pleasures	Rock manager	Television film	
1987	227	Man #1		
1989	Webster	Bob		
1989	A Different World	Security #2		
1989-1993	Doogie Howser, M.D.	Dr. Ron Welch		
1990	Married, with Children	Bailiff		
1991	Wings	T.V. Anchorman		
1994	Sister, Sister	PTA President		
1995	Fudge	Mr. Green		
1995	General Hospital	David Ward		
1995	Home Improvement	Man at Arena		
1995-1999	The Wayans Bros.	Ted Winters / Agent Doug Steckler		
1996	Lois & Clark: The New Adventures of Superman	Agent Rawlings		
1996	The Jamie Foxx Show	Vray Beaujay		
1996	Family Matters	Reverend Fuller		
1998	Seinfeld	Salesman		
2003	Buffy the Vampire Slayer	Initiative General		
2005	House	Morris		
2005	Thats So Raven	Reverend Mattson		
2007	CSI: Crime Scene Investigation	Vernon Porter		
2008	Ghost Whisperer	Bill Eritt		
2008	The Mentalist	Doctor		
2016	Criminal Minds	Warden Bryan Nabb		
2021	General Hospital	Lenny		
