= Duke Stroud =

American actor (born 1938)

- Born: Duke Sumner Stroud; April 14, 1938 (age 88); San Diego, California, U.S.
- Education: University of California at Berkeley
- Occupation: Actor
- Years active: 1968–2011

Duke Sumner Stroud (born April 14, 1938) is an American actor who has appeared on screen since the 1970s.

== Early life ==
Stroud was born in San Diego, California on April 14, 1938. His younger brother Don Stroud is also an actor.

He graduated from the University of California at Berkeley.

== Career ==
His first credited role came in 1973 when he appeared as Jameson in an episode of Mission: Impossible. He has also appeared in TV serials including The Dukes of Hazzard, Voyagers!, The A-Team, The Outlaws, Hill Street Blues, Law & Order and Human Desires.

His quote from the 1986 film Top Gun "Negative, ghost rider. The pattern is full." has become widely used in colloquial speech.

He also appeared in several films which include The Long Riders, Zoot Suit, and most recently Beautiful Dreamer. He also played Vince McKinnon on NBC's daytime soap opera Another World.

== Filmography ==
=== Film ===
| Year | Title | Role | Notes |
|---|---|---|---|
| 1980 | The Long Riders | Pinkerton | |
| 1981 | Zoot Suit | Guard | |
| 1981 | Pennies from Heaven | Counterman #1 | |
| 1983 | Max Dugan Returns | Teacher | |
| 1984 | Fleshburn | Smyley | |
| 1985 | Doin' Time | George | |
| 1986 | Top Gun | Air Boss Johnson | |
| 1990 | My Blue Heaven | Supermarket Employee | |
| 1994 | T-Force | Chief Richman | |
| 1995 | Children of the Corn III: Urban Harvest | Earl | |
| 2002 | Panic | General Roberts | |
| 2006 | Beautiful Dreamer | Colonel Chambers | |
| 2006 | Read You Like a Book | Unknown | |
| 2011 | Touchback | Duke, The Foreman | (final film role) |

=== Television ===
| Year | Title | Role | Notes |
|---|---|---|---|
| 1983 | The A-Team | Scott | Episode: "Steel" |
| 1994–1999 | Silk Stalkings | P.I. Jack Keith / Mr. Jerry Murphy | Episodes: "Ghosts of the Past" and "A Clockwork Florida Orange" |
| 2001 | JAG | Judge Merryweather | Episode: "Redemption" |
