= FourFortyFour South Flower =

Skyscraper in Los Angeles, California

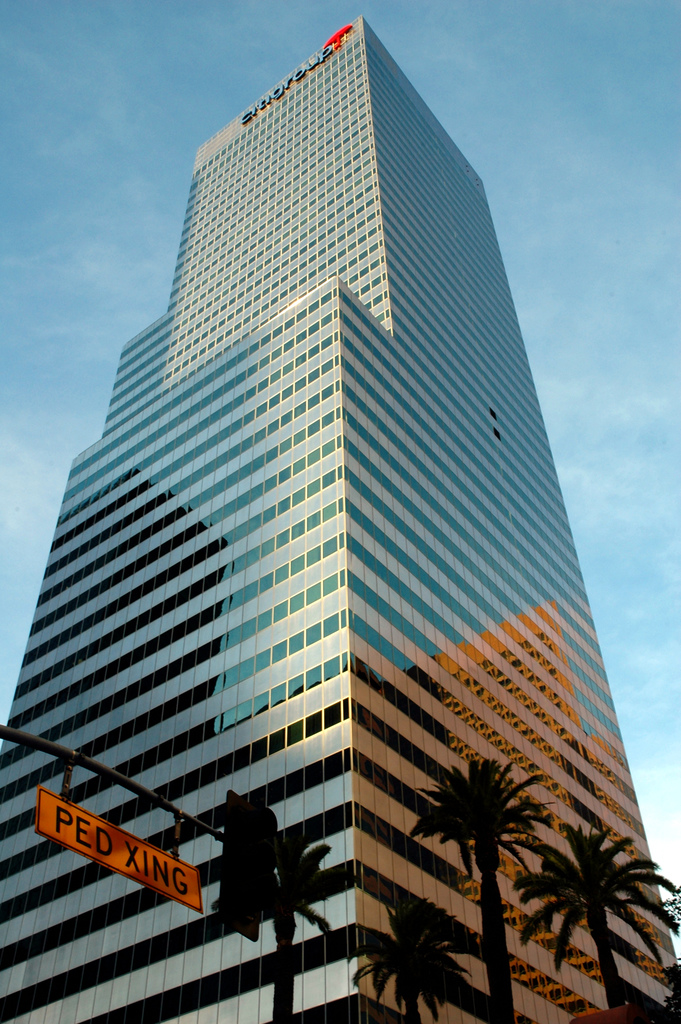
- Interactive map of the FourFortyFour South Flower area
- Former names: Citigroup Center; Wells Fargo Building; 444 Plaza Building

General information
- Type: Commercial offices
- Location: 444 South Flower Street; Los Angeles, California
- Coordinates: 34.051612°N 118.255050°W
- Construction started: 1978
- Completed: 1981
- Owner: Coretrust Capital Partners
- Operator: Coretrust Management, LP

Height
- Roof: 191 m (627 ft)

Technical details
- Floor count: 48
- Floor area: 83,053 m^{2} (893,980 sq ft)
- Lifts/elevators: 25

Design and construction
- Architect: Albert C. Martin & Associates
- Developer: Rockefeller Group
- Main contractor: AECOM Hunt Tishman

FourFortyFour South Flower, formerly Citigroup Center, is a 627 ft (191 m) 48-story skyscraper at 444 South Flower Street in the Bunker Hill area of downtown Los Angeles, California. At the time of its completion, in 1981, the tower was the fifth-tallest in the city.

== History ==
In 1935, the eight-story Sunkist Building was built by Walker & Eisen at the corner of 5th street and Hope street. In October 1970, Sunkist traded its land and building for a larger property on Riverside Drive in Sherman Oaks. In 1972, the Sunkist Building was demolished and the site sat empty for two years.

In 1981, the structure, developed by the Rockefeller Group, and designed by Albert C. Martin & Associates, opened as the Wells Fargo Building. In 2003, Beacon Capital Partners purchased the property, then known as Citicorp Center, for US$170 million from Meiji Seimei Realty (USA) and Grosvenor USA Ltd. The building was owned by Broadway Partners Fund Manager, LLC from December 2006 to September 2009. Coretrust Capital Partners acquired the property in November 2016 for $336 million. Citigroup exited the building in 2018 and moved to the nearby 1 Cal Plaza building.

== Public artwork ==
FourFortyFour South Flower is home to one of the largest public art collections in Los Angeles. When the building was constructed, five internationally recognized artists were enlisted to create public works that are represented throughout the gallery.

In addition to the pieces that were commissioned during the building's construction, a new mural by local artist Augustine Kofie was unveiled in spring 2019.

- Marc Di Suvero - "Shoshone", 1981.
- Michael Heizer - "North, East, South, West", 1967-1981.
- Frank Stella - "Long Beach XXIII", 1982.
- Robert Rauschenberg - "Fargo Podium", 1982.
- Bruce Nauman - "Trench, Shafts, Pit, Tunnel, and Chambers", 1982.
- Augustine Kofie - "Two-movement", 2019.

== In popular culture ==
- In seasons 1 and 2 of the television series Alias, the building is called the Credit Dauphine Building and is home to the criminal organization SD-6.
- The building was used on a number of occasions as a corporate office location throughout episodes of the 1983-1986 ABC action and crime drama Hardcastle and McCormick.
- Appears in the main heist of Heat.
- The building appears in the opening credits and establishing shots of the 1986-1994 NBC television drama L.A. Law as the office building in which the principal characters worked.
- The building appears in the original opening sequence of the daytime soap opera The Bold and the Beautiful.
- In the unreleased 1994 adaptation of the Fantastic Four, the building is used as The Baxter Building.
- The building was the setting for the 1996 action thriller Skyscraper, starring Anna Nicole Smith.
- The building appears in the Los Angeles level of the video game Tony Hawk's Pro Skater 3.
- The building appears in the video game Grand Theft Auto V. It is located in downtown Los Santos (the game's equivalent of Los Angeles), but is renamed the Schlongberg Sachs Center, which is the game's equivalent of The Goldman Sachs Group.
- The building appears as the headquarters of CatCo Worldwide Media in Supergirl. In season 5, Obsidian North, a Buenos Aires-based technology company, is revealed to have offices downstairs from CatCo.
- The building appears to collapse when the US Bank Tower collapses on top of it in San Andreas.
- The building appears as the Los Angeles branch of the CIA in Gotcha!.

== Major tenants ==
- WSP
- Bank of China
- Equinox
- Morgan Stanley
- Parker Stanbury, LLP

== See also ==
- List of tallest buildings in Los Angeles
