= Half Past Dead 2 =

- DVD cover
- Directed by: Art Camacho
- Written by: Andrew Stevens; D. Kyle Johnson
- Produced by: Andrew Stevens
- Starring: Bill Goldberg; Kurupt; Jack Conley; Robert Madrid
- Cinematography: Ken Blakey
- Edited by: Michael Kuge
- Music by: Jon Lee
- Production companies: Sony Pictures Home Entertainment; Andrew Stevens Entertainment
- Distributed by: Sony Pictures Home Entertainment
- Release date: May 15, 2007
- Running time: 88 minutes
- Country: United States
- Language: English

Half Past Dead 2 is a 2007 American action film directed by Art Camacho and starring Bill Goldberg and Kurupt. It is a sequel to the 2002 film Half Past Dead. Kurupt and Tony Plana are the only actors to return from the first film. The film was released straight to video in the United States on May 15, 2007.

== Plot ==
After the New Alcatraz massacre, long time inmate Twitch (Kurupt) gets himself transferred to another. He claims it's to be closer to his lady, but his real motives are a bit more grandiose than that.

There he crosses paths with Burke (Bill Goldberg) a bulky prisoner who is unfriendly and doesn't want to talk about anyone. Twitch, despite being less muscular, is just as mouthy and is pretty much the same. But there is a gang war brewing between the Black and Hispanic inmates that explodes into a hostile takeover of the prison when the Blacks' gang leader is shot dead and the finger points at Burke. But the situations worsen when the real killer and leader of the Hispanics, Cortez (Robert Madrid) takes Twitch's girlfriend (Angell Conwell) and Burke's daughter (Alona Tal) hostage as well, betraying his comrades to escape. Eventually things get more complicated as Twitch's real reason for his transfer is to find the gold from the heist, organized from the fellow New Alcatraz inmate Lester McKena.

Cortez demands a helicopter out of state or otherwise the hostages are dead. Burke and Twitch eventually catch up to Cortez and after a long fight with Burke ending up wounded, Cortez is knocked out and transferred to another prison.

Twitch is given parole after his actions that could have seen him wait even longer before he actually gets out, with Burke having to serve only a few more weeks rather than years. Twitch and his girlfriend find the gold and, as a favor for Burke, set up his account with 80 million dollars along with a plan to help Burke's daughter for college, surprising Burke himself.

== Cast ==
- Kurupt as Bernard "Twitch"
- Bill Goldberg as William Burke
- Angell Conwell as Cherise
- Robert Madrid as Alex Cortez
- Joe Perez as Lewis
- Alona Tal as Ellie Burke
- Morocco Omari as J.T.
- Jack Conley as Wallace
- Robert LaSardo as Rivera
- Tony Plana as Warden Juan Ruiz "El Fuego" Escarzaga
- Bruce Weitz as Lester McKenna (archive footage)

== Music ==
The main title for Half Past Dead 2, "Day By Day", was written by Jon Lee and Redd Stylez. The vocals were performed by Rap artist Redd Stylez.
