= Richard Steinmetz =

American actor (born 1959)

- Born: February 16, 1959 (age 67); Chicago, Illinois, U.S.
- Occupation: Actor
- Years active: 1985–present

Richard Steinmetz is an American actor, best known for his role as Martin Fitzgerald on the now-defunct NBC daytime soap opera Passions.

== Early life ==
A native of Chicago, his father was a police officer on the South Side. Steinmetz graduated from high school in Federal Way, Washington, a suburb of Seattle, and played professional soccer for the Portland Timbers.

== Career ==
After playing professional soccer, he left for San Francisco and then moved to New York City, where he worked on stage for nearly 10 years. In addition to acting, Steinmetz coaches high-school football. His team, the Venice Gondoliers, made it to the City Championships last year, where they played in front of 40,000 people.

Steinmetz made his daytime television debut in 1988 on the now-defunct ABC series Loving as Jeff Hartman, a role which he held for only a year. He had a major supporting role in the action-thriller 'Skyscraper', a 1996 direct-to-video film starring Anna Nicole Smith, where he played her screen character's detective husband. However, Steinmetz was best known as Martin Fitzgerald, whom he portrayed from May 2004 to October 2006, when Steinmetz was dropped to recurring status, and the character subsequently disappeared from the show without explanation. In May 2012, it was announced that Steinmetz would join the cast of ABC's General Hospital as the son of a previous character with a past connection to popular character Sonny Corinthos. On July 2, 2012, Steinmetz made his first appearance on the series in the role of Joe Scully, Jr. On September 15, 2012, it was announced that Steinmetz's contract with General Hospital would not be renewed. Steinmetz made his last appearance on the series on October 23, 2012.

== Personal life ==
Steinmetz resides in Los Angeles, and is the foster father of three sons and one daughter (b. 2016).

== Filmography ==
=== Film ===
Year	Title	Role	Notes
1986	Osa	Easy Ed	
1988	Hot Splash	Woody	
1989	Slaves of New York	Party Guest	
1991	Liquid Dreams	Rodino	
1991	Late for Dinner	Adult Donald Freeman	
1996	Skyscraper	Gordon Wink	
1997	Always Say Goodbye	Italian Groom	
2000	The Alternate	Swat Leader	
2001	Cahoots	Danny	
2001	Crazy/Beautiful	Coach Bauer	
2001	The One	D'Antoni	
2003	S.W.A.T.	SWAT Negotiator	
2005	Inside Out	Detective	
2007	The Life and Death of Anna Nicole	—N/a	Documentary
2014	The Barber	Businessman	
2022	They Live in the Grey	Judge	

=== Television ===
Year	Title	Role	Notes
1985	City Boy	Boyfriend	Television film
1989–1995	Loving	Jeff Hartman #3	27 episodes
1990	Law & Order	Terry Roland	Episode: "The Reaper's Helper"
1992	The Commish	Mr. Costello	Episode: "Officer April"
1993	Raven	Patrick Killian	Episode: "Something in the Closet"
1994	Greyhounds	Cam Cavanaugh	Television film
1995	Platypus Man	Steve / Officer Joe Strickler	2 episodes
1995	Marker	Allan Brewster	Episode: "Discovery"
1996	Melrose Place	Jimmy Stanley	2 episodes
1997	Silk Stalkings	Constantine Rikolakas	Episode: "I Love the Nightlife"
1997	Fired Up	Customer	Episode: "A Concurrent Affair"
1997	Women: Stories of Passion	Nicky	Episode: "Woman on the Train"
1997	Millennium	Mr. Smooth	Episode: "Jose Chung's Doomsday Defense"
1998	Viper	Richard Evans	Episode: "Old Acquaintance"
1999	Sports Night	Shane McArnold	Episode: "Shane"
2001	Crossing Jordan	Daniel Gallow	Episode: "Digger: Part 2"
2003	War Stories	Andrew Thorne	Television film
2004	Clubhouse	General Manager / Guy in Meeting	3 episodes
2004–2006	Passions	Martin Fitzgerald / Bob Wheeler	89 episodes
2006	Heroes	N.Y. Detective	Episode: "Don't Look Back"
2006	Cold Case	Dale Wilson	Episode: "Fireflies"
2008	CSI: Crime Scene Investigation	Jules Rosenthal	Episode: "Young Man with a Horn"
2009	Monk	Coach Brian Binsack	Episode: "Mr. Monk Makes the Playoffs"
2010	Tower Prep	Coach History	Episode: "Buffer"
2012	General Hospital	Joe Scully, Jr.	25 episodes
2020	Better Things	Dr. Ballinger	Episode: "DNA"
2021	Pilot Season	Stephen Montgomery	Episode: "The Nuclear Option"
2021	Days of Our Lives	Judge Robert Smails	4 episodes
