= 13 Dead Men =

- Directed by: Art Camacho
- Written by: Art Camacho; Joel Newman
- Produced by: Scott Pfeiffer; Tanya York
- Starring: Mystikal; Lorenzo Lamas
- Cinematography: Andrea V. Rossotto
- Edited by: Lewis Schoenbrun
- Music by: Collin Simon
- Distributed by: Urban Girl Productions
- Release date: October 21, 2003
- Running time: 85 minutes
- Country: United States
- Language: English

13 Dead Men is a 2003 action crime thriller film written and directed by Art Camacho and starring rapper Mystikal and Lorenzo Lamas.

== Plot ==
Master diamond thief Malichi is framed for murder and put on death row. When the corrupt warden finds that he has hidden diamonds, he tries anything he can to get him to reveal the location of the diamonds, including extending his sentence. When Malichi realizes he is not going to find justice, he turns to Caj, a belligerent inmate who agrees to help him in order to gain his own freedom.

== Cast ==
- Lorenzo Lamas as Santos
- Mystikal as Caj
- Ashley Tucker as Malachi
- Mia Riverton as Elizabeth DeLuca
- Shalena Hughes as Jay'me
- David Weininger as Warden Kowalski
- Susanna King as Rayette
