= Immortal Combat (film) =

- Directed by: Dan Neira
- Written by: Robert Crabtree; Dan Neira
- Produced by: Lamar Card; Hiroyasu Fujishima; Mitsuo Kumakura; Michio Miura; Dan Neira; Erik Saltzgaber
- Starring: Sonny Chiba; Roddy Piper; Meg Foster; Deron McBee
- Cinematography: Henner Hofmann
- Edited by: Joel Bender; Sherril Schlesinger (co-editor); Andrew Hecker (trailer)
- Music by: Ron Schwartz
- Release date: 1994
- Running time: 109 minutes
- Country: United States
- Language: English

Immortal Combat, also known as Resort to Kill, is a 1994 action film directed by Dan Neira. The plot involves an East-meets-West buddy scenario, starring martial artist Sonny Chiba, wrestler Roddy Piper, Meg Foster and Tiny Lister.

== Plot ==
An L.A. police officer (Roddy Piper) and an exchange officer from Asia (Sonny Chiba) became good friends. They are also reincarnated Mayan warriors. When their undercover drug operation at a high-end hotel fails, they are targeted by the products of an evil corporation, HybriCo run by Quinn (Meg Foster). Foster is known for producing invincible, ninja warriors for international distribution. An unstoppable monster named Lister causes mayhem for the heroes.

== Cast ==
- Sonny Chiba as Jiro "J.J." Jintani
- Roddy Piper as John Keller
- Meg Foster as Quinn
- Deron McBee as Muller
- Tommy "Tiny" Lister Jr. as Yanagi
- Woon Young Park as Osato
- Lara Steinick as Andy
- Roger Cudney as Stan
- Kim Morgan Greene as Karen Keeler
- George Belanger as Captain Edwards
- Hiroyasu Fujishima as Hiro
- Mario Ivan Martinez as Dr. Edward Collier
- Mineko Mori as Jill
- Michael Sabatino as Rudy
- Craig Mally as Davis (uncredited)
- Pamela Roth as Andy's Mother (uncredited)
- Chris Jericho as Cameo (uncredited)

== Response ==
IGN Movies rated the movie a solid two out of five.
