= T-Force (film) =

- T-Force movie poster
- Directed by: Richard Pepin
- Written by: Jacobsen Hart; Lenore Kletter
- Produced by: Jerry P. Jacobs; Scott McAboy; Joseph Merhi; Richard Pepin; Barry Primus
- Starring: Jack Scalia; Evan Lurie; Bobby Johnston; Jennifer MacDonald; Deron McBee
- Music by: Louis Febre
- Distributed by: PM Entertainment
- Release date: 1994
- Running time: 105 minutes
- Language: English

T-Force is a 1994 science fiction action film directed by Richard Pepin. Set in the near future, its plot concerns a group of law enforcement cyborgs called Cybernauts, which, after being threatened with their shutdown, rebel against their superiors and the authorities.

== Plot ==
A terrorist group led by Sam Washington (Vernon Wells) seizes the British embassy in downtown Los Angeles, killing hostages. All seems lost, but the T-Force, the world's first fully cybernetic law enforcement team is deployed and within minutes, more than thirty terrorists are dead. One member of the T-Force is destroyed Athens (R. David Smith). Upon learning this Adam (Evan Lurie), one of the members of T-Force, goes too far and shoots a disarmed and surrendering female terrorist (Spice Williams-Crosby). He then destroys a terrorist helicopter with six hostages on board including the U.N. Ambassador Chris Olsen (Clement von Franckenstein) with a grenade launcher. Mayor Pendleton (Erin Gray) and Chief Richman (Duke Stroud) of the LAPD decide to shut down the program and disassemble the cybernauts despite protest from the cybernaut's chief scientist Dr. Jon Gant (Martin E. Brooks).

Perceiving their shutdown a threat to their self-preservation, Adam, Mandragora (Jennifer MacDonald) and Zeus (Deron McBee) rebel and go on a killing rampage by targeting the mayor and the chief. Lieutenant Jack Floyd (Jack Scalia) of the LAPD teams up with Cain (Bobby Johnston), one of the cybernauts who chose to obey the law, to hunt down the renegade cybernauts and destroy them.

== Cast ==
- Jack Scalia as Lieutenant Jack Floyd
- Evan Lurie as Adam The Cybernaut
- Bobby Johnston as Cain The Cybernaut
- Jennifer MacDonald as Mandragora The Cybernaut
- Deron McBee as Zeus The Cybernaut
- R. David Smith as Athens The Cybernaut
- Erin Gray as Mayor Pendleton
- Martin E. Brooks as Dr. Jon Gant
- Vernon Wells as Sam Washington, Terrorist Leader
- Duke Stroud as Chief Richman
- Nick DeMauro as Sergeant Johnston
- Sean Moran as Peter Deserek
- Clement von Franckenstein as U.N. Ambassador Chris Olsen
- Robert Gallo as Dick
- Thom Bosco as Al
- Christopher Jackson as Clem
- Stefanos Miltsakakis as "Mohawk"
- Christy Bray as Beauty
- Spice Williams-Crosby as Female Terrorist (uncredited)
