= Gary McLarty =

American stuntman (1941-2014)

Gary McLarty (January 16, 1941 – October 11, 2014) was an American stunt performer and stunt coordinator for film and television. His abilities earned him the nickname "Whiz Kid" in Hollywood.

McLarty performed stunts in over 150 films between 1966 and 2004, among them The Wild Bunch, Little Big Man, The Longest Yard, Blade Runner, The Terminator, Jurassic Park, Heat, and Collateral. He also performed in numerous John Wayne films, including The War Wagon, The Undefeated, Chisum, McQ, and Rooster Cogburn.

In addition, he was the stunt coordinator on such films as Animal House, The Blues Brothers, Beverly Hills Cop, Beverly Hills Cop II and Days of Thunder. On Animal House, it was McLarty who, doubling as the character of "D-Day," rode the motorcycle up the fraternity house stairs. He also doubled as Henry Winkler's Fonzie for that character's motorcycle scenes on the sitcom Happy Days.

In 1982, McLarty was hired to serve as stunt coordinator on Twilight Zone: The Movie, on which he also doubled for actor Vic Morrow. On July 23, McLarty was one of six people on board a Bell UH-1 Iroquois being used during the filming of a scene for Twilight Zone when the helicopter spun out of control and crashed, killing Morrow and two children on the ground and injuring McLarty and the others aboard the helicopter. In the subsequent trial, McLarty testified that, prior to the accident, he had warned director John Landis that the stunt was too dangerous.

In addition to his stunt work, he did some acting. He had bit parts in several movies.

In 1991 McLarty shot and killed his roommate. When the police initially arrived at the residence they shot and killed another man. McLarty's house also caught on fire and burned down during the incident. McLarty semi-retired from stunt work in 2004. The following year, he testified at the murder trial of actor Robert Blake, testifying that Blake offered him $10,000 to murder Blake's wife, Bonnie Lee Bakley; McLarty declined. Bakley was fatally shot in Blake's car outside a restaurant in May 2001.

On October 11, 2014, McLarty and his friend and fellow stuntman, Bob Orrison, were killed in a traffic collision in Rancho Cordova, California. McLarty was 73.

== Filmography ==
Year	Title	Role	Notes
1971	Sometimes a Great Notion		
1974	Dirty Mary, Crazy Larry	Trooper #4	
1975	Mitchell	Mistretta Hood #2	
1975	Rooster Cogburn	Emmett	Uncredited
1979	The Apple Dumpling Gang Rides Again	Corporal #2	
1980	The Blues Brothers	Toys 'R Us Customer	
1981	...All the Marbles	Thug #2	
1982	Cannery Row	Frat Boy #7	
1982	The Beastmaster	Jun Priest	
1986	Maximum Overdrive	Guy in AC DC Van	Uncredited
1990	Hard to Kill	Shotgun Man	
1999	The Mod Squad	Howard's Muscle	
