= Skyscraper (1996 film) =

- UK DVD cover
- Directed by: Raymond Martino
- Written by: William Applegate Jr. John Larrabee
- Starring: Anna Nicole Smith; Richard Steinmetz; Branko Cikatić
- Distributed by: PM Entertainment
- Release date: July 24, 1996
- Running time: 96 minutes
- Country: United States
- Language: English

Skyscraper is a 1996 direct-to-video American film starring Anna Nicole Smith. It was directed by Raymond Martino, written by William Applegate Jr. and John Larrabee, and produced by PM Entertainment. Its plot borrows heavily from the film Die Hard, with Smith taking the lead role.

== Plot ==
Carrie Wink is a helicopter pilot employed by Heliscort, a company that offers heli-taxi transport to high level clients. She is married to Gordon Wink, a detective with the LAPD.

Fairfax, a South African criminal mastermind, is intent on collecting four interlocking electronic devices or circuits that can "shift the balance of power in the world." Through deception and violence he has acquired three of the devices.

Carrie, unbeknownst to her, has shuttled two of Fairfax’s goons to the site of one of their exchanges. The fourth device is tucked away in the Zitex building, an 86-floor skyscraper in downtown Los Angeles.

Carrie is again called to pick up two VIPs, who this time turn out to be Fairfax and his French assistant Jacques. She takes them to the building, where the terrorists take over the security system and liquidate the guards as well as appropriate an entire floor.

Fairfax meets up with Cranston, the possessor of the fourth device. As with the previous three deliverers of the devices, Fairfax plans on killing him. Cranston is mortally wounded in a shootout. Before entering the building, Cranston suspected trouble, so his companion went in unseen. Before dying, Cranston escapes with the suitcase holding the device and meets up with Carrie, who helps him up to the roof. He gives her the suitcase and admonishes her to keep it away from Fairfax at all costs.

Carrie is pursued over the roof by a goon. With no way out but over the top, she jumps into a window washer's rig. She attaches herself to a steel winch cable and drops many floors down the side of the building. Swinging around to avoid the goon's bullets, Carrie crashes through a window just as he destroys the winch with machine-gun fire, causing the cable to break free.

Carrie hides the suitcase in a trash trolley. She finds a boy playing on his toy bike and protects him (the boy's mother has been shot previously; she was blonde and was mistaken for Carrie earlier). Carrie meets up with a security guard and asks for his gun. Now armed, Carrie proceeds back to the floor where she knows that hostages have been taken.

Carrie helps confuse the terrorist operating the surveillance cameras by lighting fires in the waste paper bins, causing the fire system to alert the LA fire brigade as well as disabling some monitors. Fairfax and his gunmen capture her and offer the freedom of the hostages for the location of the suitcase. Carrie witnesses a hostage killed in cold blood, after he attempts to exchange his own freedom for the $100,000 he has stolen from the building's computer accounts. Carrie reveals the location of the suitcase.

Meanwhile, Gordon has been investigating the unusual goings-on around town. He heads for Zitex (not knowing Carrie is also there) and coincidentally stumbles upon his wife's mobile phone. Fearing for Carrie's safety, Gordon leads Fairfax’s men on a chase around the building. A guard takes her into a room and attempts to rape Carrie, who stabs him in the leg with a letter opener and shoots him dead.

She then comes up behind female terrorist Natasha and shoots her in the back, freeing the hostages. Having been trained by her husband, Carrie is an expert shot.

Gordon is being beaten up by another terrorist but is rescued by Carrie. Fairfax finds the device, kills Jacques and heads for the roof, hoping to coerce Carrie at gunpoint into flying him out. He has not bargained on Gordon also being there (Gordon also has the boy in tow). Gordon is shot in the shoulder. Carrie knocks the gun from his hand and engages Fairfax with kicks and punches which sends him falling to his death to the street below.

The boy is reunited with his mother, who has not been killed after all, as an injured Carrie and Gordon enter an ambulance.

== Cast ==
- Anna Nicole Smith: Carrie Wink
- Richard Steinmetz: Gordon Wink
- Branko Cikatić: Zarkov
- Calvin Levels: Hakim
- Jonathan Fuller: Jacques
- Lee de Broux: Captain Wood
- Deirdre Imershein: Natasha
- Charles M. Huber: Fairfax
- Deron McBee: Leidermeier
- Vincent DePalma: Johnny Hill
- Alan Brooks: Booker
- Gary Imhoff: Dudley
- Bob McCracken: Williams
- Eugene Robert Glazer: Cranston
- Seth Isler: Clancy
