= Irwin Keyes =

American actor (1952–2015)

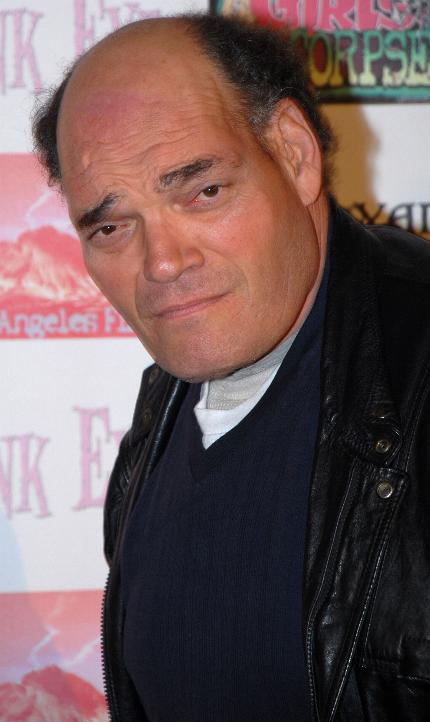
- Keyes at the premiere of Pink Eye on January 8, 2008
- Born: March 16, 1952; New York City, New York, United States
- Died: July 8, 2015 (aged 63); Los Angeles, California, United States
- Other names: Irwin Keye; Irwin Keys; Irwin Key
- Occupations: Actor, comedian
- Years active: 1978–2015

Irwin Keyes (March 16, 1952 – July 8, 2015) was an American actor and comedian, best known for his recurring role as Hugo on The Jeffersons. He appeared in several films and several television series.

== Early life ==
Keyes was born in New York on March 16, 1952. Keyes grew up in Amityville, New York and graduated from Amityville Memorial High School in 1970. He acted in his first play "The Lower Depths" by Maxim Gorky while attending college. Frequently cast as likable lugs, brutish goons, and imposing authority figures, Irwin acted in a diverse array of movies in such genres as horror, comedy, thriller, science fiction, and action. Keyes achieved his greatest popularity with his recurring role as oafish bodyguard Hugo Majelewski on the sitcom The Jeffersons. Among the TV shows that Irwin made guest appearances on are Laverne & Shirley, Police Squad!, Moonlighting, Married... with Children, thirtysomething, Growing Pains, Tales from the Crypt, and CSI: Crime Scene Investigation. Keyes also performed in television commercials and music videos, and did voiceover work for video games. Irwin lived in Los Angeles, California and continued to act until his death.

== Death ==
On July 8, 2015, Keyes died at the Playa Del Rey Center in Los Angeles, California of complications of acromegaly at age 63.

== Filmography ==
- 1978 Team-Mates as Frank "Big Frank"
- 1978 Manny's Orphans as "Shove"
- 1979 The Warriors as Police Officer in Central Park
- 1979 Nocturna: Granddaughter of Dracula as Transylvania Character
- 1979 Squeeze Play! as Bouncer
- 1979 The Prize Fighter as "Flower"
- 1979 The Gang That Sold America as Support Killer
- 1980 Friday the 13th as Busboy (uncredited)
- 1980 Bloodrage as Pimp In Hallway
- 1980 The Exterminator as Bobby
- 1980 Stardust Memories as Fan Outside Hotel
- 1980 The Private Eyes as Jock
- 1981 Lovely But Deadly as Gommorah
- 1981-1984 The Jeffersons (TV Series) as Hugo Mojelewski
- 1982 Police Squad! (TV Series) as Luca
- 1982 Zapped! as "Too Mean" Levine
- 1983 Chained Heat as Lorenzo
- 1984 Exterminator 2 "Monster"
- 1987 Nice Girls Don't Explode as Cocker
- 1987 Married... with Children (TV Series) as Mr. Hugo
- 1987 Death Wish 4: The Crackdown as Joey, Bauggs' Chauffeur
- 1988 Frankenstein General Hospital as The Monster
- 1988 Kandyland as Biff
- 1989 Growing Pains (TV Series) as Jeff
- 1990 Down the Drain as Patrick
- 1990 Mob Boss as Monk
- 1990 Disturbed as Pat Tuel
- 1991 Guilty as Charged as Deek
- 1991 Adventures in Dinosaur City as Guard #1
- 1991 Motorama as Hunchback Attendant
- 1992 On the Air (TV Series) as "Shorty", The Stagehand
- 1992 Tales from the Crypt (TV Series) as Figure
- 1993 Magic Kid as The Bookie
- 1993 Dream Lover as Officer
- 1993 Sam & Max Hit the Road (Video Game) as Bruno (voice)
- 1993 Double Switch (Video Game) as Brutus
- 1994 The Silence of the Hams as Guard
- 1994 Oblivion as Bork
- 1994 The Flintstones as Joe Rockhead
- 1995 Get Smart (TV Series) as Agent 0 / Drowning Victim
- 1995 The Power Within as Mosh
- 1995 Timemaster as Orphanage Aide
- 1996 Oblivion 2: Backlash as Bork
- 1996 Pure Danger as "Killjoy"
- 1998 The Godson as Tracy Dick
- 1999 Tequila Body Shots as Jailman #1
- 2000 The Flintstones in Viva Rock Vegas as Joe Rockhead
- 2001 The Vampire Hunters Club (Video Short) as Obnoxious Dancer
- 2001 Perfect Fit as Otto, Convict
- 2002 Legend of the Phantom Rider as Bigfoot
- 2003 House of 1000 Corpses as Ravelli
- 2003 Intolerable Cruelty as "Wheezy Joe"
- 2005 Neighborhood Watch as Vernon
- 2005 ShadowBox as The Mechanic
- 2006 Wristcutters: A Love Story as Stiff Drinks Bartender
- 2006 Sent as Judas
- 2006 Wrestlemaniac as The Stranger
- 2007 Dream Slashers as The Mechanic
- 2007 Careless as Bob "Woodsman Bob"
- 2007 DarkPlace as The Mechanic
- 2007 CSI: Crime Scene Investigation (TV Series) as Russ Beauxdreaux
- 2008 The Urn as Albert
- 2008 Doesn't Texas Ever End
- 2009 Black Dynamite as Henchman
- 2010 Dahmer vs. Gacy as Dr. Pruitt
- 2009 Glass Houses
- 2011 Ham Sandwich (Short) as Hunchback
- 2011 Evil Bong 3: The Wrath of Bong as The Killer
- 2012 The Master & Me (Short) as Ygor
- 2013 Dead Kansas as Giant
- 2013 Pretty Little Liars (TV Series) as "Creepy"
- 2014 Catch of the Day as Kletus Thorne
- 2014 Titano (Short) as Titano
- 2015 Angel Investors
- 2015 Portend
- 2016 The Caretaker as Sebastian
