= Gary Maloncon =

American basketball player and actor

Gary Maloncon is a former college and professional basketball player and actor. He is listed at 6 ft 8 in (203 cm).

== Early life ==
Maloncon spent at least some of his childhood in Gardena in Los Angeles County, California. He attended Crenshaw High School in Los Angeles where he received significant publicity. He was also profiled on 60 Minutes regarding the recruiting done by high schools.

== Playing career ==
=== College ===
Maloncon played forward for the UCLA Bruins from 1981 through 1985. He was the starting power forward for the Bruins in his last two years and helped them win the 1985 NIT Championship. His senior year, he was team captain as well.

=== Professional ===
He was later selected in the seventh round (143rd pick overall) of the 1985 NBA draft by the Los Angeles Clippers but was cut by the team and never got to play in the NBA. He later signed to play professionally in Israel for the Hapoel Ramat-Gan team. Maloncon also took his game to the Continental Basketball Association (CBA) with the Albany Patroons (1986–1988) where he helped win a championship in 1988.

== Acting career ==
After retiring, Maloncon went to Hollywood and dabbled in acting, particularly in parts where his height is useful. He played Bigfoot in his first acting role in the TV movie, Bigfoot: The Unforgettable Encounter.

=== Filmography ===
- Bigfoot: The Unforgettable Encounter (1994)
- Forget Paris (1995)
- Rebound: The Legend of Earl 'The Goat' Manigault (1996)
