= Art Camacho =

American actor

- Born: 1965 (age 60–61); Los Angeles, California, United States
- Occupations: Director, Fight choreographer, actor, producer, stuntman

Art Camacho is an American film director, producer, actor and stuntman. His directorial work includes Recoil in 1998, 13 Dead Men in 2003, Confessions of a Pit Fighter in 2005 and Half Past Dead 2 in 2007; Assassin X in 2016, and Wild League in 2018,. His acting work includes Chinatown Connection in 1990, The Power Within in 1995, Tiger Heart in 1996 and Little Bigfoot 2: The Journey Home. Camacho's autobiography "A filmmaker's Journey" was published in 2017.

== Background ==
Camacho started out producing and directing commercials before moving into directing, choreographing and producing action films. By 2015, he had worked in at least 50 action films as either stuntman or choreographer. One of the films he has directed is Recoil which is from PM Entertainment, the company responsible for many of the direct to video action films in the 1990s to early 2000s. Camacho went on to write, producer and direct several other films. Camacho's credits include Seized starring Scott Adkins, Dead Trigger starring Dolph Lundgren, Half Past Dead starring Steven Seagal. He also directed his first film in Russia: Wild League. One of Camacho's influences is Eric Lee.

== Filmography ==
Director
Title	Year	Notes #
Ring of Fire	1991	
Karate Tiger 8: Fists of Iron Ring of Fire 2: Blood and Steel	1993	
The Power Within	1995	
Little Bigfoot	1997	
Recoil	1998	
Little Bigfoot 2: The Journey Home	1998	
The Cutoff	1998	
The Company Man	1998	
Point Doom	2000	
Final Payback	2001	
Gangland	2001	
Redemption	2002	
13 Dead Men	2003	
Sci-Fighter	2004	
Confessions of a Pit Fighter	2005	
Soft Target	2006	
Half Past Dead 2	2007	
Flawed	2014	
The Chemist	2016	
Father and Father	2018	
Ruthless	2023	
The Wrecker	2025	
