= Recoil (1998 film) =

- Directed by: Art Camacho
- Written by: Art Camacho; Richard Preston Jr.
- Screenplay by: Richard Preston Jr.
- Story by: Art Camacho
- Produced by: Richard Pepin; Joseph Merhi
- Starring: Gary Daniels; Gregory McKinney; Tom Kopache
- Edited by: Heidi Scharfe
- Music by: Timothy Michael Wynn
- Distributed by: PM Entertainment Group
- Release date: May 12, 1998
- Running time: 96 minutes
- Country: United States
- Language: English

Recoil is a 1998 American action/thriller film written by Richard Preston Jr., produced by Richard Pepin and Joseph Merhi, directed by Art Camacho and starring Gary Daniels, Gregory A. McKinney, and Robin Curtis.

== Plot ==
When Los Angeles Police Department officers kill a young bank robber after a brutal bank heist, the slain criminal's father, mob boss Vincent Sloan, unleashes a blood bath on the police force. One by one, Detective Ray Morgan's partners are gunned down, but when his family is murdered, Morgan has nothing left to live for - except revenge. Becoming an unstoppable one man army, Morgan goes on the ultimate hunt for justice. At the end, Morgan gets his revenge. He kills Sloan with an exploding barrel.

== Cast ==
- Gary Daniels as Detective Ray Morgan
- Gregory McKinney as Detective Lucas Cassidy
- Thomas Kopache as Captain Trent
- Billy Maddox as Mr. Brown
- John Sanderford as Chief Detective Arnold "Cat" Canton
- Robin Curtis as Julie Sloan
- Kelli McCarty as Tina Morgan
- Maurice Lamont as Officer Alex Boorman
- Richard Foronjy as Vincent Sloanç

== Production ==
The film was written by Camacho and Richard Preston Jr. Gary Daniels, playing the lead role, is also co-producer.

== Reception ==
The film is considered a "B-movie" and received negative critical response at the time of its release.

Filmdienst described the film as follows: "An action film that relies on the dubious appeal of lurid scenes of violence and robs itself of any opportunity to generate suspense through outrageous exaggerations and numerous implausible moments. Sticky sentimentality and religious phrases don't make things any more enjoyable."

The German website TVspielfilm called it "Deadly boring from the start", while the German Filmjahrbuch 2000 found that it amounted to "worn-out action junk".

Noting the cuts that were made to the film in its later versions, the German website Schnittberichte.com gave an ironic piece of advice to the viewer: "It's certainly wise to close your eyes briefly after Gary Daniels has killed an opponent, and only open them again a few seconds later, when Daniels has finished his pose and removed his strange facial expression."

Tiempo de hoy, however, noted that Daniels had been praised "for the filming of the fight scenes, to the point that various commentators ha[d] stated that this [was] the best film of all those he ha[d] starred in so far." Including it in a list of 10 action movies for MovieWeb, Adam Symchuk wrote: "The plot may be rather cookie-cutter, but Daniels's stunt work and presence here is peak 90s machismo. Guns, martial arts, explosions, people falling from railings: Recoil will scratch that itch for a good cheesy 90s action movie." Tom Jolliffe found that "the threee R’s, Riot, Recoil and Rage were the best, not only of what Daniels produced in that decade, but among the best PM did."
