= Echo Bridge Home Entertainment =

American independent distribution company

Echo Bridge Entertainment
- Predecessor: Alliance Atlantis (television distribution assets)
- Founded: 1995; 31 years ago (as Platinum Disc Corporation); 2005; 21 years ago (as Echo Bridge Home Entertainment)
- Defunct: 2021; 5 years ago
- Fate: Folded into SP Distribution
- Successor: SP Distribution; WildBrain
- Headquarters: La Crosse, Wisconsin (home entertainment); White Plains, New York (international sales); Needham, Massachusetts (headquarters); Beverly Hills, California (acquisitions)
- Area served: International
- Key people: Michael Rosenblatt, CEO; Nathan Hart, President (home entertainment); Emilia Nuccio, President (international)
- Services: Video, digital, television distribution
- Subsidiaries: Alliance Atlantis International Distribution; PM Entertainment
- Website: www.echobridgeentertainment.com

Echo Bridge Entertainment was an American independent distribution company. It acquired and distributed feature films, scripted and non-scripted series, documentaries, and children's programming for home video, digital and television in the United States and throughout the world. Since its acquisition of Alliance Atlantis International Distribution and recent distribution partnerships with Miramax and ABC Disney/Buena Vista, Echo Bridge Entertainment had a combined portfolio of over 11,000 titles, including Degrassi: The Next Generation (a co-production with DHX Media's Epitome Pictures), until DHX Media acquired the family library in November 2014.

== History ==
Echo Bridge Home Entertainment, a division of Echo Bridge Entertainment, was founded in 1995 as Platinum Disc Corporation, initially distributed DVDs of low-budget and public domain films. It was named and had its logo inspired from the real Echo Bridge in Newton, Massachusetts. In February 2004, Echo Bridge Entertainment was founded at the American Film Market, with the acquisition of the libraries of CineTel Films and PM Entertainment. In September 2004, Echo Bridge announced that it would acquire the Green Communications library. In July 2005, Platinum Disc Corporation and Echo Bridge Entertainment merged to form Echo Bridge Home Entertainment. In April 2008, Echo Bridge acquired the international operations, including television distribution rights to Alliance Atlantis library from Goldman Sachs, with the exception of the CSI franchise, which was retained by CBS. In 2011, Echo Bridge Entertainment and Miramax owner Filmyard Holdings made a distribution deal in which Echo Bridge would release 251 films from the Miramax catalog. The other 550 films from Miramax's catalog went to Lionsgate and StudioCanal as Filmyard had a similar distribution deal with them. On March 17, 2014, after Echo Bridge lost the distribution rights to the Miramax titles, the Miramax releases all went out of print and any mention of them was removed from their website. Lionsgate later expanded their deal with Miramax to include the 251 films previously released by Echo Bridge until 2020, when Paramount Home Entertainment (which parent company acquired a 49% stake of Miramax in 2019) extended their own deal with Miramax to include those 251 films. In 2014, Echo Bridge sold its family library to DHX Media (now known as WildBrain).

In January 2017, filmmaker and producer Steven Paul purchased the non-family assets of Echo Bridge, which in turn renamed as Echo Bridge Acquisition Corp, later becoming dormant and then folded into SP Distribution in 2021, with the distribution rights to the Echo Bridge/PM/Alliance Atlantis library in turn acquired by the New York City-based distributor and streaming service FilmRise for digital distribution. By 2025, Shout! Studios, by now based in Santa Monica, California, had acquired the FilmRise library, including the Echo Bridge library.

== Filmography ==
- Platinum Disc Library
- Echo Bridge Home Entertainment Library

== See also ==
- Alliance Atlantis
- Miramax
- PM Entertainment
- The Asylum
