= Ted Jan Roberts =

American actor, martial artist, stuntman, and producer

- Roberts in 2008
- Born: Ted Jan Roberts; September 24, 1979; Los Angeles, California, U.S.
- Died: June 6, 2022 (aged 42)
- Other name: T. J. Roberts
- Occupation: Actor
- Years active: 1990–2022

Ted Jan Roberts (September 24, 1979 – June 6, 2022) was an American actor, martial artist, stuntman, and producer. He was best known as the title character of the television series Masked Rider, an American adaptation of the Japanese tokusatsu television series Kamen Rider Black RX.

== Career ==
Born Thedore Gilroy, the name Ted Jan Roberts was a stage name created by his father Richard Gilroy Ortega and martial arts stunt coordinator Pat Johnson. It later became his legal name. Roberts played the lead roles in martial arts films such as Magic Kid (with Don "The Dragon" Wilson playing himself) and its sequel Magic Kid II, in Tiger Heart, A Dangerous Place, and The Power Within. He also appeared in adventure/drama film Hollywood Safari and the live-action TV series Masked Rider after appearing as the titular character in the three-part third season premiere of Mighty Morphin Power Rangers. He played LGBT activist Dennis Peron in Milk (2008).

== Death ==
In June 2025, a Redditor discovered a Facebook post made in 2024 by Roberts' father, Richard G. Ortega, mourning Roberts' death on June 6, 2022. At the time of the Reddit post, Roberts was erroneously listed as a stunt performer for Sonic the Hedgehog 3 on IMDb, casting doubts to the news. A month later, fellow Masked Rider cast member, Libby Letlow, confirmed Roberts' death. Ortega refused to disclose the cause of death.

== Filmography ==
=== Film ===
Year	Title	Role	Notes
1993	Magic Kid	Kevin Ryan	
1994	Magic Kid 2	Kevin Ryan	
1994	A Dangerous Place	Ethan	
1995	The Power Within	Stan Dryer	
1996	Tiger Heart	Eric	
1997	Hollywood Safari	Josh Johnson	
2005	In the Blink of an Eye	Steven Chavez	
2008	Milk	Dennis Peron	

=== Television ===
Year	Title	Role	Notes
1992	Married... with Children	Brian	Episode: "Every Bundy Has a Birthday"
1993	Evening Shade	Matt	Episode: "The Dance"
1995	Mighty Morphin Power Rangers	Prince Dex / Masked Rider	Episode: "A Friend in Need"
1995–1996	Masked Rider	Prince Dex / Masked Rider	Main role
1999	Hollywood Safari	Josh Johnson	19 episodes
