= Bigfoot: The Unforgettable Encounter =

1995 film by Corey Michael Eubanks

- Directed by: Corey Michael Eubanks
- Written by: Corey Michael Eubanks
- Produced by: Scott McAboy; Gilbert Alexander Wadsworth III
- Starring: Matt McCoy; David Rasche; Crystal Chappell; Zachery Ty Bryan
- Cinematography: Ken Blakey
- Edited by: Howard Flaer
- Music by: Michael Hughes
- Distributed by: PM Entertainment
- Release date: 1995
- Running time: 88 minutes
- Country: United States
- Language: English

Bigfoot: The Unforgettable Encounter is a 1995 American independent family film about the legendary creature Bigfoot and a young boy he befriends. The film was written and directed by Corey Michael Eubanks and stars Zachery Ty Bryan as the young boy Cody and Gary Maloncon as Bigfoot.

== Plot ==
A young boy named Cody Higgins (Zachery Ty Bryan) lives in the Pacific Northwest. One day, he develops a friendship with the legendary Bigfoot. He must now race to save his new friend when a greedy multi-millionaire named Chaz Frederick (David Rasche) places a bounty on Bigfoot enough for 500 hunters, 50 park rangers, and an ambitious scientist named Samantha (Crystal Chappell) to swarm the forest looking for it.

== Cast ==
- Matt McCoy as Park Ranger Nick Clifton
- David Rasche as Chaz Frederick
- Zachery Ty Bryan as Cody Higgins
- Crystal Chappell as Samantha
- JoJo Adams as Ben
- Brian Avery as Zackery
- Derek Barton as TV Talk Show Host
- Douglas Bennett as Walter
- Michael Buice as Hal
- Liam Day as Newscaster
- Erika Rosander as Skier
- Gary Maloncon as Bigfoot
- Kelly Kenneally as Bigfoot
- Eddie Frierson as Bigfoot Vocal Effects (voice)
- Clay M. Lilley as Vester
- Clint Howard as Gary
- Darrell Mapson as Park Ranger Voss
- Joel Gayner as Artist
- Rance Howard as Todd Brandell
- Rif Hutton as Jess
- Neal Matarazzo as Sheldon
- Janice Lynde as Betty
- Dennis Singletary as Booker
- Alan Wilder as Vern Vendor
- Tohoru Masamune as Ling
- Robert Orrison as Joe Perkins
- David Rowden as Dubow
- Russell Solberg as Stringer
- George O'Mara as Lee
- Neil Summers as Delbert
- Douglas Bennett as Walter
- Mark Kriski as Newsman
- John Molo as Architect
- Jessica Swan as Customer
- Jerry Spicer as reporter #4
- Debbie James as Misty Vales
- Ingo Neuhaus as Boris

== Reception ==
Audiences on Rotten Tomatoes give the film a 38% rating, based on 37 reviews, with an average rating of 2.6/5. The New York Times critic Sandra Brennan writes: "This action-packed outdoor adventure was designed especially for young children."

== Release ==
The film was distributed by Republic Pictures Home Video in 1995.
