= Hollywood Safari =

- Movie Poster
- Directed by: Henri Charr
- Written by: Robert Newcastle; Henri Charr (story); Jess Mancilla (story)
- Produced by: Jess Mancilla
- Starring: John Savage; Ted Jan Roberts; David Leisure; Debby Boone; Ryan J. O'Neill; Kenneth Tigar; Don Wilson
- Cinematography: Guido Verweyen; David Wittkower
- Edited by: Henri Charr; Jess Mancilla
- Music by: Richard McHugh
- Distributed by: PM Entertainment Group
- Release date: August 15, 1997
- Running time: 99 min.
- Country: United States
- Language: English

Hollywood Safari is a 1997 American film, starring John Savage, Ted Jan Roberts, Don Wilson, David Leisure and Debby Boone. It was directed by Henri Charr and written by Robert Newcastle, Henri Charr and Jess Mancilla. The film generated a spin-off, the TV series Hollywood Safari, which ran for one season on Animal Planet from 1997 to 1998.

== Plot ==
The film revolves around an animal trainer and his family.

== Cast ==
- John Savage as Deputy Rogers
- Ted Jan Roberts as Josh Johnson
- Don Wilson as Greg
- David Leisure as Troy Johnson
- Debby Boone as Jane Johnson
- Ryan J. O'Neill as Peter Johnson
- Kenneth Tigar as Sheriff Todd

== Reception ==
In a mixed review, the author M. Faust wrote, "Everything you would require in a family movie but not much more, Hollywood Safari contains enough heroic animals and vanquishable villains to hold the attention spans of both children and parents." VideoHound gave the film 2.5 stars, calling it "a pleasant enough time-waster". The reviewers Mick Martin and Marsha Porter also gave it 2.5 stars, writing, "Adventure aimed at kids, who may not mind the jumpy plot and cheapo special effects." Knight-Ridder News Service film critic Randy Myers rated the film a B, finding it to be "Good family fun, with some genuine suspense and laughs."
