= The Power Within (1995 film) =

- Directed by: Art Camacho
- Written by: Joe Hart; Scott McAboy
- Produced by: Scott McAboy; Joseph Merhi; Richard Pepin
- Starring: Ted Jan Roberts; Karen Valentine; Keith Coogan; John O'Hurley; Ed O'Ross; Jacob Parker; William Zabka
- Cinematography: Ken Blakey
- Edited by: Chris Worland
- Music by: Jim Halfpenny
- Production company: PM Entertainment Group
- Distributed by: PM Entertainment Group
- Release date: October 24, 1995
- Running time: 97 minutes
- Country: United States
- Language: English

The Power Within is a 1995 karate film directed by Art Camacho and written by Joe Hart and Scott McAboy.

== Plot ==
Stan Dryer, a teenager with a green-belt in karate but little success in life, is given an ancient ring by an old karate master whom Stan tried to save from impending doom.

Stan soon discovers the magical power of the ring when he defeats five drunk, low-life idiots who want to steal his red convertible. He even discovers that the ring gives him the power to answer any question you may have about the rise and fall of Communism in Russia.

Soon Stan starts taking advantage of his power. One day, at lunch, Stan and his friend notice the top jock at school asking his girlfriend why they broke up. Stan and his friend overhear the conversation and Stan's friend says something along the lines of, "...it'd be nice if someone would shove his jockstrap in his face..." Stan counters this by saying, "I think I can do better than that."

Stan then gets up and asks out the top jock's ex-girlfriend. The top jock becomes furious and tries to punch Stan, but Stan grabs his fist in defense. A fight breaks out, and Stan ends up defeating 12 jocks in the process. Soon Stan meets up with an evil man named Vonn and also meets a monkey that is actually a reincarnated version of the old man. Stan discovers his powers were in him the whole time and defeats Vonn, ends up with the female "love interest" and is happy.

== Cast ==
- Ted Jan Roberts as Stan Dryer
- Karen Valentine as Clyda Dryer
- Keith Coogan as Eric Graves
- William Zabka as Raymond Vonn
- John O'Hurley as Lieutenant Cabrell
- Gerald Okamura as Yung
- Tracy Melchior as Sandy Applegate
- P.J. Soles as Mrs. Applegate
- Irwin Keyes as Mosh
- Jean Speegle Howard as Dr. Richman
- Karen Kim as Hin-See
- Ed O'Ross as Deriva
- Jacob Parker as Deke Dryer
- Marc Riffon as Rocky
- Francis Fallon as Leon
- Don "The Dragon" Wilson as Himself
