= Lawrence Hilton Jacobs =

American actor and singer (born 1953)

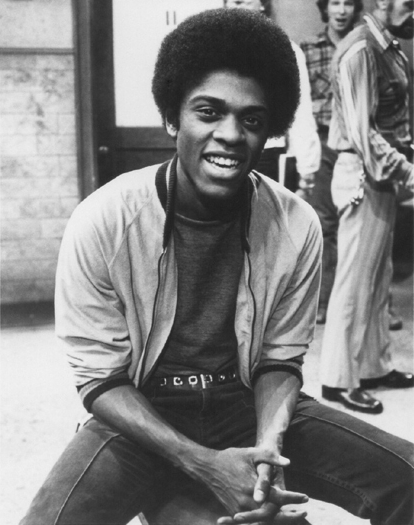
- Lawrence Hilton Jacobs, c. 1976
- Born: September 4, 1953 (age 72); New York City, U.S.
- Occupations: Actor, singer
- Years active: 1974–present
- Known for: Freddie "Boom Boom" Washington in Welcome Back, Kotter
- Children: 2

Lawrence Hilton Jacobs (born September 4, 1953), also credited as Lawrence Hilton-Jacobs and Lawrence Hilton-Jacques, is an American actor and singer. Best known for playing Freddie "Boom Boom" Washington in Welcome Back, Kotter (1975–1979), he has also appeared in a number of films and television shows, including Claudine (1974), Cooley High (1975), Roots (1977), Bangers and Mash (1983), Alien Nation (1989–1990), The Jacksons: An American Dream (1992), and 31 (2016).

== Life and career ==
Jacobs was born in New York City, New York, the fifth of nine children of parents Hilton Jacobs (1920–2000) and Clothilda Jacobs (1922–2008). He began his acting career in the summer of 1969 and graduated from the High School of Art and Design in 1971. He attended Wilkes University for a short time before his acting career took off. Afterward, he studied acting with the Negro Ensemble Company and the Al Fann Theatrical Ensemble.

In 1975, he won the role of Freddie "Boom Boom" Washington on the ABC hit comedy series, Welcome Back, Kotter. Jacobs also starred in cult classic Cooley High in 1975 played as Richard "Cochise" Morris, and two years later had a role in the block-buster ABC mini-series Roots. Jacobs starred in a few commercials over the years, including an early 1970s commercial for The United Negro College Fund. Later in his career, he appeared in the 1989–1990 science fiction TV series Alien Nation as Sgt. Dobbs, an LAPD detective. He portrayed Panda Thomas (#1) in Rob Zombie's slasher film 31.

Jacobs portrayed Joseph Walter "Joe" Jackson, the father of the Jackson family, in the 1992 miniseries The Jacksons: An American Dream. He also appeared in a commercial for Salon Selectives.

Jacobs sang on Rick James' 1981 album, Street Songs.

As a homage to him, the housing project in Eddie Murphy's television program The PJs is named the Hilton-Jacobs Projects.

He has two daughters.

== Filmography ==
=== Film ===
Year	Title	Role	Notes
1974	Claudine	Charles	
1974	Death Wish	Mugger in Park #2	
1974	The Gambler	Street Basketball Boy	
1975	Cooley High	Richard "Cochise" Morris	
1978	Youngblood	Rommel	
1978	The Comedy Company	Russell Dodd	Television film
1980	For the Love of It	Al	Television film
1985	The Annihilators	Floyd	
1988	Paramedics	Blade Runner	
1989	L.A. Heat	Det. Jon Chance	
1989	Angels of the City	Det. Jon Chance	Video
1989	L.A. Vice	Det. Jon Chance	
1989	East L.A. Warriors	Chesare	
1990	Kill Crazy	Rubin	Video
1990	Chance	Det. Jon Chance	
1991	Quietfire	Jessie Palmer	Video
1992	Tuesday Never Comes	Druilet	
1993	Indecent Behavior	Lou Parsons	
1997	Tidal Wave: No Escape	Marlan Clark	Television film
1999	Mr. Right Now!	-	Video
2001	Southlander	Motherchild	
2002	Hip, Edgy, Sexy, Cool	-	
2002	The Streetsweeper	Jackie	
2003	Killer Drag Queens on Dope	Mr. Fly	
2004	30 Miles	Anthony	
2005	Don't Give Me the Finger	Ross	Short
2007	Sublime	Mandingo	Video
2008	Otis	Male Nurse	
2009	Young American Gangstas	Elmer Reese	
2011	Nocturnal Agony	Theodore	
2013	Playin' for Love	Coach Preston Reid	
2014	Airplane vs. Volcano	Jim Kirkland	Video
2015	Mercy for Angels	Chief	
2015	Tamales and Gumbo	Mr. Walker	
2015	The Christmas Gift	Wesley Hardin Johnson Sr.	Television film
2016	31	Panda Thomas	
2016	Dead Man Rising	Warden Dallas	
2017	A Chance in the World	Mr. Robinson	
2017	Sins of the Father	Kenny	Short
2018	Welcome to Where You've Always Been	Homeless Man	Short
2018	Compton's Finest	Hostage Negotiator	
2020	She's the One	Playboy	
2020	Shooting Heroin	Edward	
2020	The Perfect Mate	Rev. Adams	
2021	Escape from Death Block 13	Agent Langley	

=== Television ===
Year	Title	Role	Notes
1975–79	Welcome Back, Kotter	Freddie 'Boom-Boom' Washington	Main cast
1976	Mr. T and Tina	Freddie 'Boom-Boom' Washington	Episode: "Pilot"
1976	Baretta	Dave Rich	Episode: "Can't Win for Losin'"
1977	Roots	Noah	Episode: "Part V"
1979	Paris	Thomas Sims	Episode: "Dear John"
1980	Barnaby Jones	Wes Carter	Episode: "The Price of Anger"
1981	Darkroom	Young Man/Pimp	Episode: "Needlepoint"
1981	Lewis & Clark	Dave Rich	Episode: "The Uptight End"
1984	On the boulevard	Joe, an L.A. street musician	Main character. Short film in memory of producer/director Horace Jenkins
1985	Rituals	Lucky Washington	Regular cast
1986	New Love, American Style	-	Episode: "Love and Video Dating/Love at the Bus Stop"
1986	Simon & Simon	Gordon Tate	Episode: "The Blue Chip Stomp"
1986	The Redd Foxx Show	Warren	Episode: "The Good Samaritan"
1986	Fame	Lamar	Episode: "The Inheritance"
1987	Hill Street Blues	Crumley	Episode: "The Cookie Crumbles"
1989–90	Alien Nation	Sergeant Dobbs	Main cast
1992	The Jacksons: An American Dream	Joe Jackson	TV mini-series
1994	Renegade	Rocky Dussault	2 episodes
1995	Charlie Grace	Detective Gossett	Episode: "Take Me to the Pilot"
1995	Pointman	Joe Neal	Episode: "Take the Points"
1995	Martin	Kevin Jones	Episode: "Swing Thing"
1995	Diagnosis: Murder	Sgt. Baker	Episode: "All American Murder"
1996	The Parent 'Hood	Greg Harvey	Episode: "Torn Between Two Brothers"
1996	Roseanne	Louis	Episode: "Roseambo"
1996	Homeboys in Outer Space	Staff	Episode: "Super Bad Foxy Lady Killer or Ty and Morris Get the Shaft"
1997	Weird Science	Mr. Black	Episode: "Boys on the Hide"
1997	Mr. Rhodes	Freddie 'Boom Boom' Washington	Episode: "The Welcome Back Show"
1997	Tracey Takes On...	James	Episode: "Race Relations"
1997	Moesha	Sgt. Baker	2 episodes
1998	The Wayans Bros.	Richie	Episode: "Help a Brother Out"
1998	L.A. Doctors	Robert Edwards	Episode: "A Prayer for the Lying"
2000	The Jamie Foxx Show	Milton	Episode: "Rollin' in the Dough"
2002	Static Shock	Driver	Voice, episode: "Sunspots"
2002–03	Gilmore Girls	Principal Merton	2 episodes
2004	Girlfriends	Leonard James	Episode: "New York Bound"
2004	That's So Raven	Mr. Carter	Episode: "There Goes the Bride"
2009	Players at the Poker Palace	Donny	Recurring cast
2011	Chuck	President of Zamibia	Episode: "Chuck Versus the Tooth"
2011–13	Let's Stay Together	Charles Sr.	Recurring cast: Season 1, guest: Season 3
2014	Family Time	Carl	Episode: "The Will"
2018	Rel	Mitchell	Episode: "Re-Enter the Dragons"
2019–	A House Divided	Cameran Sanders, Sr.	Main cast
2022–23	The Proud Family: Louder and Prouder	Chuck	Voice, 2 episodes

== Music credits ==
- Lawrence Hilton Jacobs S/T (1978)
- All the Way...Love (1979)
- Let Me Do It (1981) (producer); performed by Halo; sought-after record among collectors.
