= Joe Piscopo =

American actor (born 1951)

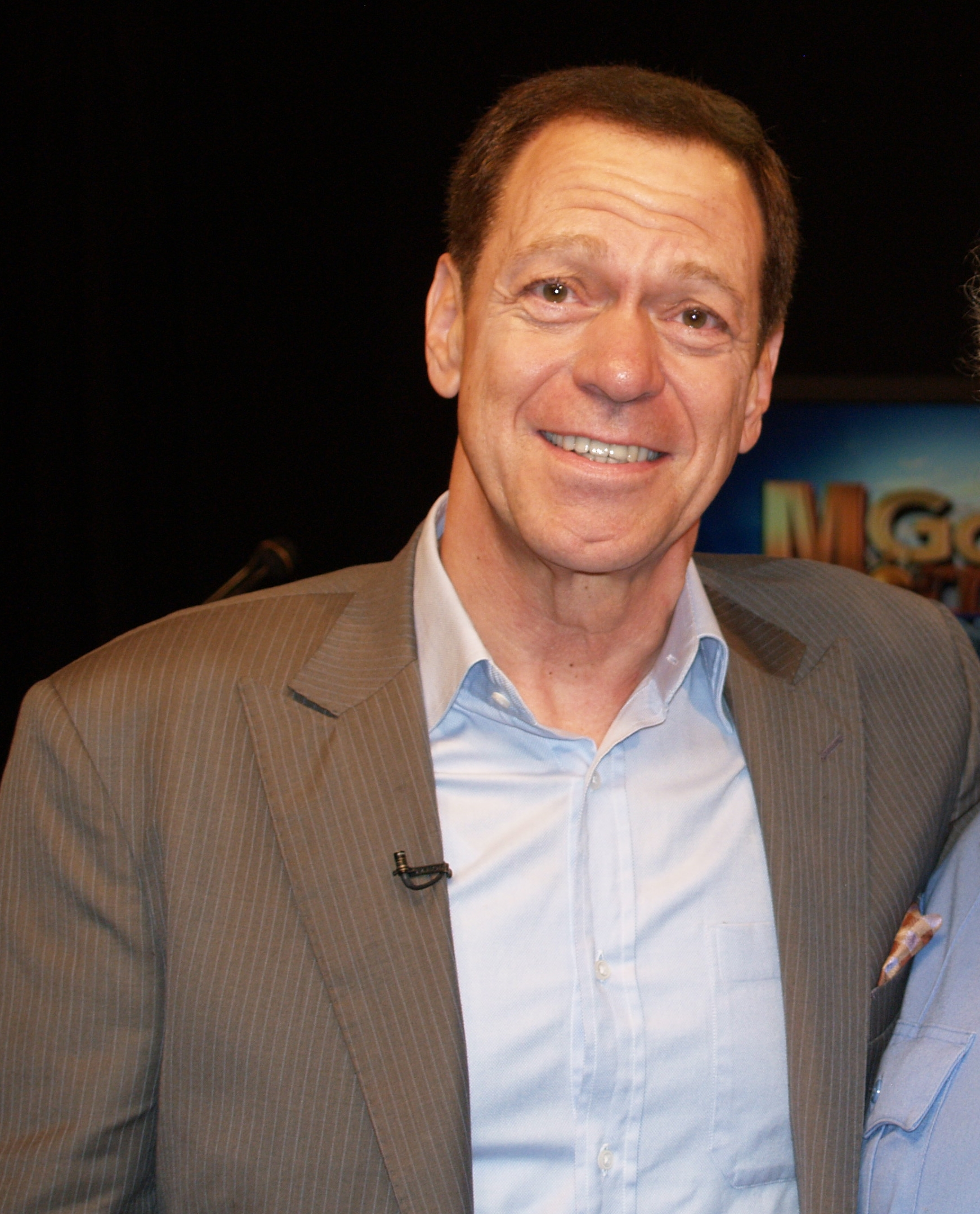
- Piscopo in May 2009
- Born: Joseph Charles John Piscopo; June 17, 1951 (age 75); Passaic, New Jersey, U.S.
- Education: Jones College (BA)
- Occupations: Actor; comedian; radio host
- Years active: 1975–present
- Political party: Democratic (before 2014); Independent (2014–present)
- Spouses: Nancy Jones (m. 1973–1988) Kimberly Driscoll (m. 1997–2006)
- Children: 5

Joseph Charles John Piscopo (/ˈpɪskəpoʊ/ PIS-kə-poh; born June 17, 1951) is an American actor, comedian, and conservative radio talk show host. He was a cast member on Saturday Night Live from 1980 to 1984, where he played a variety of recurring characters. His film roles include Danny Vermin in Johnny Dangerously (1984), Moe Dickstein in Wise Guys (1986), Doug Bigelow in Dead Heat (1988) and Kelly Stone in Sidekicks (1992).

== Early life and education ==
Piscopo was born in Passaic, New Jersey, on June 17, 1951, and grew up in North Caldwell, New Jersey. He attended West Essex High School and was a member of the drama club "The Masquers." He developed a reputation for never playing a part the way it was written. After graduating in 1969, Piscopo attended Jones College in Jacksonville, Florida, where he received a degree in broadcast management.

== Career ==
=== Saturday Night Live ===
In the summer of 1980, Piscopo was hired as a contract player for Saturday Night Live. The show had gone through a major upheaval when all the writers, major producers, and cast members left that spring. The new cast bombed with critics and fans with the exception of Piscopo and Eddie Murphy. As a result, they were the only two cast members to be kept when Dick Ebersol took over the show the next spring. With the success of SNL, Piscopo moved to the quiet upscale borough of Alpine, New Jersey.

Piscopo is best known for his impressions of celebrities including Frank Sinatra. Piscopo rewrote the lyrics for a Sinatra sketch with the help of Sinatra lyricist Sammy Cahn and recalled that "by the grace of God, the old man loved it." Piscopo later reprised his role as Sinatra in a series of stop-motion animated ads for Lipton Brisk Iced Tea. He had an occasional spot on the Weekend Update segment as a bombastic sports commentator who would pose a series of questions and usually follow them up with a loud, "Who cares?" Piscopo and Robin Duke also played The Whiners.

=== Post-Saturday Night Live career ===
Piscopo left Saturday Night Live at the end of the 1983–1984 season. In 1984, he starred with Michael Keaton in the movie Johnny Dangerously, which received mixed reviews. He also starred in an HBO special and wrote a book for Pocket Books titled The Piscopo Tapes. An album, New Jersey, for Columbia Records, followed in 1985 and an ABC special titled The Joe Piscopo New Jersey Special in May 1986. In 1987, Piscopo was mentioned in the Tom Petty and the Heartbreakers single "Jammin' Me".

In the mid-to-late 1980s, Piscopo developed an interest in bodybuilding. While doing impressions of Bruce Springsteen on SNL, he first became involved with it. He appeared on the cover of Muscle & Fitness magazine in April 1988 and again in June 1990. In the 1990 issue he said, "Some people in Hollywood think I'm nuts with this bodybuilding stuff. They'll say, 'You're getting too big. You'll hurt your career.' But they don't understand that high that comes from a workout, the challenge, and the personal victory."

Since January 2014, Piscopo has hosted Piscopo in the Morning, a radio show from 6:00 am to 10:00am weekdays on 970AM The Answer in Hackensack, New Jersey. From the inception of his radio program until June 2020, the show was produced by Frank Morano, who also served as an on-air contributor. Beginning on December 13, 2020, Piscopo began to host Sunday Nights with Sinatra on 770 AM WABC in New York City and WABC's sister station 107.1 FM WLIR in Hampton Bays, New York.

Piscopo considered running as an independent for governor of New Jersey in 2017 based in part on the political success of Donald Trump, for whom he campaigned in 2016. He was encouraged by a number of political figures, including former New York City mayor Rudy Giuliani. However, in May 2017, he decided not to run. He has been active in a band and performed stand up and music at a political rally hosted by businessman Mike Lindell in May 2021.

== Personal life ==
In 1973, Piscopo married Nancy Jones. They had one child and divorced in 1988. In 1997, he and Kimberly Driscoll married. She was his son's nanny when Piscopo was married to Jones. Driscoll and Piscopo had three children and divorced in 2006.

Piscopo is a resident of Lebanon Township, New Jersey and has lived in Tewksbury Township, New Jersey. Piscopo was diagnosed with thyroid cancer in 1990.

== Awards ==
In 2013, Piscopo was inducted into the New Jersey Hall of Fame.

== Filmography ==
Year	Title	Role	Notes
1976	King Kong	Bit Part	Uncredited
1977	American Tickler	Announcer	aka Draws
1980—1984	Saturday Night Live	Main cast	
1984	The House of God	Dr. Fishberg	
1984	Johnny Dangerously	Danny Vermin	
1984	The Joe Piscopo Special	Himself	Television special
1986	Julian Lennon: Stick Around	Rival	Video short
1986	The Joe Piscopo New Jersey Special	Himself	Television special
1986	Wise Guys	Moe Dickstein	
1988	Dead Heat	Doug Bigelow	
1988	Star Trek: The Next Generation	The Comedian	Episode: "The Outrageous Okona"
1992	Sidekicks	Kelly Stone	
1993	Batman: The Animated Series	Mugsy, Manager	Voice, episode: "Read My Lips" (credited as Joe Piscapo)
1994	Huck and the King of Hearts	Max	
1995	Open Season	Hamlet	
1995	Two Bits & Pepper	Zike, Spider	
1995	Captain Nuke and the Bomber Boys	Mr. Wareman	
1995	Multimedia Celebrity Poker	Himself	Video game
1999	Law & Order	Jeff Stahl	Episode: "Ambitious"
2000	Baby Bedlam	Jack	
2001	Bartleby	Rocky	
2001	Law & Order	Art Cahill	Episode: "Formerly Famous"
2004	Law & Order	Jarret Whitestone	Episode: "Cry Wolf"
2006	Last Request	Angelo	
2006	Dead Lenny	Louis Long	
2012	Joe Piscopo: A Night at Club Piscopo	Himself	Television special
2013	How Sweet It Is	Jack Cosmo	
2018	Law & Order: Special Victims Unit	Albert Romano	Episode: "Mama"
