= Terror T.R.A.X.: Track of the Vampire =

1995 audio interactive CD-ROM game

Terror T.R.A.X.: Track of the Vampire is a 1995 audio interactive CD-ROM game published by TSR.

== Gameplay ==
Terror T.R.A.X.: Track of the Vampire is a game in which the secret government organization T.R.A.X. (Trace, Research, Analyze and Exterminate) deals with supernatural situations.

== Reception ==
Denys Bakriges reviewed Terror T.R.A.X. in White Wolf Inphobia #55 (May, 1995), rating it a 4 out of 5 and stated that "For the price of a music CD, you get an evening's worth of interactive fun. Enterprising gamemasters can make use of the CD's special effects, eerie noises and unusual dialogue in their tabletop games."

== Reviews ==
- PC Review
