= Magic Kid =

1993 film by Joseph Merhi

Magic Kid (also known as Little Ninja Dragon; released in the Philippines as Ninja Sidekick) is a 1993 American film.

== Plot ==
Kevin Ryan is an 11-year-old karate-champion from Kalamazoo, Michigan, who spends his summer with his uncle, Bob Ryan and his girlfriend Anita in California. His older sister Megan Ryan is coming with him. Bob owns a management bureau for clowns-acts. He has money problems and owes $10,000 to a mafioso named Tony. Because of all his problems he starts and ends his day with a bottle of Jack Daniels, even in his morning-coffee. Tony wants his money back and sends his nephew and two collectors to Bob. Bob is still in bed when the Mafia arrive, but Kevin sees the three thugs entering the house to take $15,000 off Uncle Bob. Tony is very pissed about it, so Bob takes his niece and nephew out of the house. Kevin offers to help his uncle against the bad guys. Megan gets in trouble when she goes to a club to meet her crush, Tommy Hart. The bad guys recognize her and want to kidnap her, but Bob and Kevin, who were looking for Megan, arrive just in time. Kevin takes out the thugs, but then comes 'The Animal', a big, very large tough guy. And then comes Don 'the Dragon' Wilson to save the day.

== Cast ==
- Stephen Furst as Bob Ryan
- Ted Jan Roberts as Kevin Ryan
- Shonda Whipple as Megan Ryan
- Joseph Campanella as Tony
- Sandra Kerns as Anita
- Irwin Keyes as The Bookie
- Don "The Dragon" Wilson as Himself

== Release ==
Magic Kid was released direct-to-video in the United States in 1993. In the Philippines, the film was released in theaters as Ninja Sidekick by Viking Films on February 1, 1994.

== Sequel ==
In 1994 a sequel was made, called Magic Kid 2.
