= L.A. Heat (film) =

- Directed by: Joseph Merhi
- Written by: Charles T. Kanganis; Lawrence Hilton-Jacobs
- Produced by: Joseph Merhi; Richard Pepin
- Starring: Lawrence Hilton-Jacobs; Jim Brown
- Cinematography: Richard Pepin
- Edited by: Paul G. Volk
- Music by: John Gonzalez
- Production company: PM Entertainment
- Distributed by: PM Video
- Release date: February 1989
- Running time: 1hr 25min
- Country: United States
- Language: English
- Budget: $135,000 (estimated)

L.A. Heat is a 1989 police film directed by Joseph Merhi and starring Lawrence Hilton-Jacobs and Jim Brown. The film follows Detective Jon Chance, a Los Angeles detective who dreams of being a cowboy hero and living by "the code of the West," as he is assigned to track down a violent drug dealer.

== Plot summary ==
Jon Chance, an L.A. vice cop who is a man who dreamed of being a cowboy hero. He saw himself as an exemplary hero who always felt that the use of guns was not a necessity. However, Chance needs to stop dreaming. He needed to return to the real world! Jon Chance gets an assignment which he can't say no to and has to accept, to bust a drug dealer named Clarence. The case later gets personal when Carl, Chance's partner get killed by Clarence during a routine drug bust. A drug war will soon ensue between Clarence, who is trying to retrieve his drugs and money, and the police...

== Cast ==
- Lawrence Hilton-Jacobs as Jon Chance
- Jim Brown as Captain
- Kevin Benton as Clarence
- Myles Thoroughgood as Spyder
- Trish Johnson as Jane
- John Henry Richardson as Boris
- Robert Gallo as Sylvio

== Reception ==
TV Guide gave the film two stars out of four, calling it "A reasonably entertaining low-budget crime thriller". Variety called the film "an okay made-for-video feature", praising Jacobs' "ernest performance" but describing the sound recording as "a bit rough and ready".

== Legacy ==
The film was a success on home video and was followed by three sequels, Angels of the City (1989), L.A. Vice (1989), and Chance (1990), in which Lawrence Hilton-Jacobs reprises his role as Detective Jon Chance.
