= Tiger Heart =

- Directed by: Georges Chamchoum
- Written by: William Applegate Jr. (screenplay)
- Produced by: Joseph Merhi (producer); Marta Merrifield (co-producer); Richard Pepin (producer); Bob Roberts (associate producer); Ted Jan Roberts (associate producer)
- Starring: Ted Jan Roberts; Jennifer Lyons; Robert LaSardo; Rance Howard; Timothy Williams; Carol Potter
- Cinematography: Maurice K. McGuire
- Edited by: Kevin Mock; Ron Shaw
- Music by: John Gonzalez
- Release date: November 12, 1996
- Running time: 90 minutes
- Country: United States
- Language: English

Tiger Heart is a 1996 American action film directed by Georges Chamchoum and starring Ted Jan Roberts.

== Plot ==
A martial arts expert takes on a gang of criminals.

== Cast ==
- Ted Jan Roberts as Eric
- Carol Potter as Cynthia
- Jennifer Lyons as Stephanie
- Robert LaSardo as Paulo
- Rance Howard as Mr. Johnson
- Timothy Williams as Brad
- David Michael as Bobby
- Brian Gross as Steve
- Vincent DePalma as Manny
- Christopher Kriesa as Nat
- Gene Armor as Randolph
- Elena Sahagun as Chi-Chi
- Diane Klimaszewski as Amy
- Elaine Klimaszewski as Amanda
- Lorissa McComas as Jill
- Art Camacho as Sensei
- Frank Bruynbroek as Cyril
- George Calil as Jack
- Gary Bullock as Brad's Father
- Albert Garcia as Ferret
- Jhoanna Trias as Billie
- Ron Yuan as Johnny
- Caroline Kim as Exchange Student
- Timothy D. Baker as Cop
- Denney Pierce as Drunk
- Chris S. Koga as Thug #1
- Randall Shiro Ideishi as Thug #2
- Chester E. Tripp III as Thug #3
- Jason A. McNeil as Thug #4
- Tim Sitarz as Bouncer
- Cole S. McKay as Punk
- Rob King as Punk
- Richard Humphreys as Punk
- Paul Allen as Karate Student

== Soundtrack ==
- Derol Caraco - "Tiger Heart" (Written by John Gonzalez)
- Cynthia Manly - "We Like Crushin' You" (Written by John Gonzalez)
- Pattie Kelly - "Constant Conflict" (Written by John Gonzalez)
