= Magic Kid 2 =

1994 film by Stephen Furst

Magic Kid 2 is a 1994 film sequel of Magic Kid directed by Stephen Furst.

== Plot ==
Kevin Ryan is a film star named Ninja Boy. David Wadsworth is a film producer who expects big money from his new film starring Ninja Boy. Meanwhile, Kevin has to study to pass on to the 10th grade but he won't succeed if he keeps on starring in movies. Kevin's agent is his uncle Bob Ryan, who plays poker all day with his friends. Kevin is home-schooled by his tutor Suzanne, who wants Kevin to finish school. When Kevin visits Suzanne's home, he asks her daughter Maggie on a date. Maggie agrees and soon Kevin falls in love with her. Meanwhile, Uncle Bob, who is concerned about the millions of dollars he will owe if Kevin breaks his movie contract, supports Kevin choosing the film. Kevin then runs away from home. David gives Uncle Bob 24 hours to find Kevin. Uncle Bob doesn't find him and David sends Luther (his bodyguard) after him. After a motorcycle chase, Bob gets arrested. Luther bails him out and takes him back to his house. Then Uncle Bob finds Kevin's school book and goes to Suzanne. When Kevin returns from a date with Maggie, he hears that Uncle Bob and Suzanne had a long talk and both decided that Kevin must go to school first. That brings Uncle Bob in conflict with David, who makes a plan to kill the Ninja Boy character.

== Cast ==
- Stephen Furst as Bob Ryan
- Ted Jan Roberts as Kevin Ryan
- Jennifer Savidge as Suzanne Patterson
- Dana Barron as Maggie Patterson
- Hugo Napier as David Wadsworth
- Don Gibb as Luther
