= Two Bits & Pepper =

- Directed by: Corey Michael Eubanks
- Written by: Corey Michael Eubanks
- Starring: Joe Piscopo; Lauren Eckstrom; Rachel Crane
- Production company: PM Entertainment Group
- Distributed by: Republic Pictures
- Release date: 1995
- Running time: 89 minutes
- Country: United States
- Language: English

Two Bits & Pepper is a 1995 family dramedy film directed by Corey Michael Eubanks and starring Joe Piscopo, Lauren Eckstrom, and Rachel Crane. The plot concerns two young girls who get into mischief with their pet horses. They are kidnapped by a pair of bumbling crooks who hold them for ransom, and it is up to their equine pets to rescue them.

== Plot ==
Two Bits and Pepper are horses, living in Central California with their owners, Tyler and her parents, Roger and Carla. One day, after school, Tyler's best friend, Katie, sets out a plan to get her to ride Two Bits and Pepper into town. Carla refuses to allow Tyler to do so, so Katie makes up a concept to go below the highway that runs across their property rather than to directly cross it, as Carla did not clearly state that they could not go below it.

Carla witnesses Tyler and Katie in a hang-out session with Two Bits and Pepper in town, alongside their best friends. After putting Two Bits and Pepper into the property, Tyler sets off for the main road. Earlier in the day, two crooks named Zike and Spider attempt to kidnap a young boy at school under the ploy that it's a free ride home. He meets up with his father, who reports Zike and Spider to the police.

Katie crosses the road, but not before meeting up with Zike and Spider. They try to grab her under the ploy that her dad knows them. She escapes by throwing rocks at them. Tyler makes it home at sunset. Carla yells at her for having disobeyed her, leading her to run away, but Carla thinks it was just a trick.

Later in the night, Roger arrives home to find Carla crying because Tyler is gone. After checking Two Bits and Pepper's pins, they set off for the police station. Tyler is hanging out at Katie's house. Zike and Spider are pulled over by the police for matching the description of the car that the boy's father gave them. After letting them go, the police station is rampant with reports and sightings of the kidnappers. The FBI is also on the case.

Later that night, Zike and Spider break into Katie's house, leading her to drop a candle and burn the whole house down. They make it out, running into the field.

The police, the firefighters, Roger, and Carla make it to Katie's house, which is burning when they arrive.

At the same time, Two Bits and Pepper have escaped from their pins, walking through the fields to find Tyler and Katie with their telepathy. The next day, they are hiding from Zike and Spider in a shack. Suddenly, Zike and Spider burst inside, shutting the door.

A few minutes later, Two Bits and Pepper run by the search party, making the search crew suspicious. The search crew veers off course, trying to kill them for horse meat.

In the shack, Tyler and Katie are told that there is a ransom to set them free. At the police station, there are missing posters for them, leading Roger to be saddened. Two Bits and Pepper are taken into the back of a man's truck. After staying at a saloon in town for some time, it is revealed that he is drunk. Pepper sets Two Bits free and he leaps out of the truck as the man drives off.

Zike and Spider set easy traps on Tyler and Katie, leading them to easily be set free from their seats. Just before they escape, Zike and Spider arrive, congratulating them on doing so. Spider grabs a winch and threatens to break their legs with it if they move a muscle out of their seats. They sit back down, following his commands. Meanwhile, Zike is hanging out outside a trading post in town, begging a woman to leave her keys in her car. Suddenly, a small kid grabs a stick and hits Zike in the leg with it. He then gets bitten by a dog, running to the car. He pretends to own it as he drives it off.

Meanwhile, back at the shack, Tyler and Katie trick Spider into leaning over to kill a spider on the floor. After leaning over, he kicks a panel of the wall, leading Tyler and Katie to try to escape. Katie makes it, but Tyler is dragged back inside by Spider. Zike arrives with the stolen car and takes Tyler into it; they are gonna drive her to Mexico to sell her to a cartel. Katie runs to safety, while Two Bits and Pepper enter the chase of a lifetime.

Zike, Spider, and Tyler cross a railroad track, leaving Two Bits and Pepper behind. They find a shortcut, leading Two Bits under the track, and into town. Pepper is too big for the shortcut, so he must wait. Meanwhile, the search crew bust down the shack, finding nothing suspicious.

Two Bits follows Zike, Spider, and Tyler to a bridge, blocking them just as they cross it. Spider does not run over him, citing car concerns. Tyler is crying at this point.

Spider jumps out of the car, grabbing a pistol. He messes with it, not pulling the trigger. Soon, Two Bits makes him flinch, leading him to accidentally fire a shot at him. Tyler is horrified as he falls to the ground. Zike does not take too kindly of the act, letting Tyler pass by and cry with Two Bits as he's dying.

The search crew's helicopter narrows in on the scene. Spider fires multiple shots at it, turning the car around with Zike inside. They survive multiple shots from the helicopter, stopping and taking off on foot.

Suddenly, Pepper bursts back into the scene, slamming into Zike and Spider. Spider falls into the river and Zike falls onto the hilltop. This leads to Zike's arrest. The police arrive at Two Bits and Tyler, leading to a large reunion with Roger, Carla, and everybody else. The search crew captures Spider in a net, arresting him.

A few hours later, in a veterinary hospital, Two Bits is undergoing surgery. He survives the gunshot in the end.

A few weeks later, Tyler and Katie are riding on Pepper, when Two Bits arrives behind them. They ride into the sunshine, while the screen goes black.

== Legacy ==
Although the film did not fare well at the box office, it was among the first in a new trend of movie-style in the late 1990s, where an animal was kidnapped or injured by a set of two male antagonists, and it is up to the protagonist (usually a girl) to save it. This film was different, in where the protagonist was kidnapped and the animal had to save it. This was common in direct-to-video family films in the late 1990s, specifically ones released by Walt Disney Home Video. Films like this included Gordy, Air Bud, and Soccer Dog, which was released by Columbia Pictures in 1999. This was rather common in its time, citing an absence in new animation and family entertainment system concepts before the rise of Pixar Animation.

There is an un-related historical story about the cavalry horse, Two-Bits, that served with the United States Infantry.

== Cast ==
- Joe Piscopo as Zike and Spider
- Dennis Weaver as Sheriff Pratt
- Lauren Eckstrom as Tyler
- Rachel Crane as Katie
- Perry Stephens as Roger
- Kathrin Middleton as Carla
- Shannon Gallant as Monica
- Ethan Erickson as Boyfriend
- George Fisher as Deputy Daniels
- Tim Redwine as Justin
- Elle Seymour as Helen
