= Hassim =

Hassim may refer to:

== People ==
- Adila Hassim, South African lawyer
- Moses Magogo Hassim (born 1976), Ugandan sports administrator and politician
- Rina Hassim (born 1947), Indonesian actress and singer
- Shireen Hassim, South African political scientist
- Zulkiffli Hassim (born 1986), Singaporean footballer
- Hassim Hassam, actor who plays El Chameleon in the 1988 movie Final Reprisal

== Other ==
- Hassim Killi railway station, a railway station in Pakistan
- a character in the 1992 film Aladdin by Golden Films

== See also ==
- Hashim
- Hasyim
