= Vannessa Vasquez =

American actress

- Education: University of Houston; Stella Adler Studio of Acting
- Occupation: Actress
- Years active: 2010–present

Vannessa Vasquez is an American actress known for starring in East Los High (2013), The Brave (2017) and The Fix (2019). She began her acting career performing in local theatres in Houston, Texas, later gaining her first role in television working with singer-songwriter Frankie J on the reggaeton mix of his Billboard Hot 100 hit "Obsessions (No Es Amor)".

== Career ==
Vasquez began her career by performing in local stage theatres in Houston. One of her first Television gigs was working with singer-songwriter Frankie J on the reggaeton mix of his Billboard Hot 100 hit "Obsessions (No Es Amor)". She was the lead actress in the independent horror and thriller film "Sorrow", as well as an associate producer. She starred as Magdalena Cruz in "Sins of a Call Girl" and as Esperanza in "Narca", directed by R. Ellis Frazier. She co-starred as Gracie in the action film "Misfire", alongside Gary Daniels.

In 2014, Vasquez became one of the lead actresses in Hulu’s East Los High series, the first English-language Hulu series with an all-Latino cast. She plays Camila Barrios, a Mexican teenager dealing with the trials and tribulations of growing up in East Los Angeles.

In 2018 she was cast as one of the lead actors in the ABC pilot The Mission.

== Personal life ==
Vasquez is a member of Sigma Lambda Gamma sorority. She is a dancer, with training in bachata, salsa, cumbia, merengue and hip-hop. She is also fluent in Spanish. In the fall of 2014, Alegria Magazine named her one of its "Top 10 Latinas making waves in Hollywood". In 2016 she was named one the top 8 leading ladies for TV y Novelas Magazine.

== Filmography ==
=== Films ===
Year	Title	Role	Notes
2010	Jump Out (Short)	Temelda	
2011	Asesinas (Short)	Assassin 1	
2011	The Darq	Susan	
2013	The Adventures of Don Juan and Don Tu (Short)	Henchwoman Marisa	
2014	Sorrow	Mila Sweeney	
2014	Sins of a Call Girl	Magdalena Cruz	
2014	The Hours Til Daylight (post-production)	Sarag	
2014	Narca (post-production)	Esperanza	
2014	Misfire	Gracie	
2022	Divorce Bait	Alexis	

=== Television ===
Title	Year	Role	Notes
East Los High	2014 - 2017	Camila Barrios	48 episodes lead
The Brave	2018	Mari Diaz	1 episode
The Mission	2018	Officer Ezme Chizo	series regular
The Fix	2019	Dia Briseño	2 episodes
