= Misfire =

Misfire may refer to:

- Misfire (Transformers), the Transformers character
- Misfire (film), a 2014 American action film
- "Misfire" (That '70s Show), an episode from That '70s Show
- An engine misfire, see engine knocking
- A song on Queen's album Sheer Heart Attack
- A malfunctioned cartridge that fails to discharge at all (dud), doesn't discharge promptly (hang fire), or only partially discharges (squib load) when being shot from a firearm.
- A muzzleloader that does not fire when the trigger is squeezed.

== See also ==
- Firearm malfunction
