= Zero Tolerance (2015 film) =

2015 film by Wych Kaosayananda

- Film poster
- Directed by: Wych Kaosayananda
- Screenplay by: Wych Kaosayananda
- Starring: Dustin Nguyen; Gary Daniels; Scott Adkins; Sahajak Boonthanakit; Nina Paosut
- Release date: February 10, 2015 (Thailand)
- Running time: 90 minutes
- Language: English

Zero Tolerance is a 2015 Thai–American action film directed by Wych Kaosayananda and starring Dustin Nguyen, Gary Daniels and Scott Adkins. It premiered on February 10, 2015 at the Thailand International Film Destination Festival.

== Plot ==
Two former paramilitary operatives, Johnny (Nguyen) and his police detective friend Peter (Boonthanakit), search Bangkok to find the killers of Johnny's young daughter Angel (Paosut) and deliver retribution.

== Production ==
The film was mostly shot in 2011 and was originally titled Angels. It was initially conceived as a slow-burn, character-driven drama but could not find distribution in that form. Re-shoots and re-editing were undertaken several years later to add more action and nudity. Adkins and Kane Kosugi were added to the cast for some brief scenes during the re-shoots as it was thought that their name recognition would help sell the film. Dustin Nguyen's wife Bebe Pham took the role of the madam of a high-end sex club. In some territories the film has been sold as 2 Guns: Zero Tolerance to suggest a (non-existent) connection to the 2013 American film.

== Reception ==
The film received divided reviews. The Action Elite critic noted: "So many critics gave this film the shaft by nitpicking that it felt like two totally different movies, mainly because it was edited from another festival contender. Having seen countless recuts of various films, I felt like this film ultimately succeeded (especially when viewing this back-to-back with its original film it was edited from, Angels, afterwards) as the new added scenes and overall stylish editing don’t hurt the overall narrative". Zach Nix from City on Fire film site, despite largely negative review, noted the film's "excellent cast comprised of Dustin Nguyen..., Sahajak Boonthanakit..., and Gary Daniels"; he concluded: "Zero Tolerance is a fascinating and sad reminder of the woes of distribution and marketing. While far from perfect, it’s clear that Kaosayananda’s originally envisioned Angels was a personal and dramatic actioner that was near to the director’s heart. Unfortunately, Kaosayananda had to compromise his vision in order to get Angels sold to the rest of the world. Therefore, his mostly dramatic film was cut down to a mere hour and a half, retitled, and turned into more of a streamlined action picture that would pique action fans’ interest, especially with the inclusion of Adkins. The saddest truth of them all is that Zero Tolerance’s post-production woes are more fascinating than the film itself." Another very negative review on Nerdly called the film "a waste".
