= Rumble (2016 film) =

- Official poster
- Directed by: R. Ellis Frazier
- Written by: Benjamin Budd
- Produced by: Marty Murray III; Arturo Jimenez; R. Ellis Frazier
- Starring: Gary Daniels; Sissi Fleitas; Eddie J. Fernandez; Justin Nesbitt
- Cinematography: Jorge Roman Alarcon
- Edited by: Badhouse Post
- Music by: Larry Groupé
- Production company: Badhouse Studios Mexico
- Distributed by: Hannibal Pictures
- Release date: June 4, 2016
- Running time: 92 minutes
- Country: Mexico
- Language: English

Rumble is a Mexican action film directed by R. Ellis Frazier, written by Benjamin Budd, and starring Gary Daniels, Sissi Fleitas, Eddie J. Fernandez, and Justin Nesbitt. The film marks the third collaboration between Daniels and Frazier; the second being Misfire in 2014 and the first being Across the Line: The Exodus of Charlie Wright in 2010.

== Premise ==
David Goran - an aging, former MMA fighter - is forced back into the ring when his girlfriend is kidnapped by a Mexican cartel leader.

== Cast ==
- Gary Daniels as David Goran
- Sissi Fleitas as Eva
- Eddie J. Fernandez as Rampage
- Justin Nesbitt as Marty
- John Solis as Concierge
- Luis Gatica as Agent Fonseca
- Fabian Lopez as Ramiro
- Pedro Rodman as Front Desk Guy
- Isidoro Rojas as Thug
- Luis Raul Alcócer as Manny
