= Old Jack's Boat =

British Drama television series

- Developed by: Clare Bradley; Pui Fan Lee; Chris Jarvis
- Starring: Bernard Cribbins
- Country of origin: United Kingdom
- Original language: English

Production
- Running time: 15 minutes
- Production company: BBC In-House Children's Production

Original release
- Network: CBeebies
- Release: 21 January 2013 – 5 April 2015

Old Jack's Boat is a British children's television series that stars Bernard Cribbins as Old Jack, the owner of a multi-coloured boat called The Rainbow. In each episode Jack (Cribbins) tells a story to his dog, Salty.

== Production ==
The series was filmed in Staithes in Yorkshire, and the scenery of the area is heavily featured in the episodes. Bernard Cribbins, in talking about the location, said “I’ve filmed in a lot of locations throughout my career, but there's something about the sea air, the beauty and the friendliness in Staithes that makes it a special place to be.”

The first two series each had two stories written by Russell T Davies, with whom both Bernard Cribbins and Freema Agyeman had previously worked on Doctor Who. This was the first time Davies had ever written for a pre-school audience. On writing for pre-schoolers Davies said "It's exciting new territory for me, writing for this age range. But this is the age when your imagination first starts! And when the call came from Bernard, asking me on board, I couldn't refuse - I'd do anything for that man!"

== Reception ==
Old Jack's Boat was positively received upon broadcast. Aislinn Kinsella, writing for Best British TV, said that the program was "suitably amusing for a CBeebies show" and that it was "sure to be a hit with the little ones and one or two older folks!" Glen Chapman, writing for website Den of Geek, said of the series: "Well, come on, it's Bernard Cribbins telling stories? What more could you ask for? The man is a national treasure." The location filming was also praised, with Chapman saying that Staithes "looks every bit the idyllic location".

== Cast ==
- Old Jack: Bernard Cribbins
- Shelly Periwinkle: Freema Agyeman
- Captain Periwinkle: Don Gilet
- Ernie Starboard: Paul Hawkyard
- Miss Bowline-Hitch: Helen Lederer
- Emily Scuttlebutt: Janine Duvitski
- Sam Spinnaker: Nadine Marshall
- Salty the dog: Scuzz
- Young Jack: Sam Benjamin
- Sailor Sue: Carolina Main

== Episodes ==
Episodes of the show usually start with a segment featuring Jack and Salty helping their friends with something.

Jack and Salty then head to the Rainbow, where Jack usually has something to do, but puts it off to tell the story.

After the story, there is another segment featuring Jack and Salty finding out if that character was successful in whatever they told them to accomplish.

The episode ends with Jack and Salty walking off into the distance.

== Spin-offs ==
A spin-off title Old Jack's Boat: Rockpool Tale is about adventures of sea creatures, and another, Salty's Waggy Tale is about the adventures of Salty the Dog.
