= I Am Vengeance =

- Directed by: Ross Boyask
- Written by: Ross Boyask
- Produced by: Diane Shorthouse, John Adams
- Starring: Wade Barrett; Anna Shaffer; Bryan Larkin; Kevin Leslie; Gary Daniels; Keith Allen
- Production company: Evolutionary Films
- Release date: 2018
- Running time: 92 minutes
- Country: United Kingdom
- Language: English

I Am Vengeance (sometimes called just "Vengeance") is a 2018 British action film written and directed by Ross Boyask and starring Wade Barrett, Anna Shaffer, Bryan Larkin, Kevin Leslie, Gary Daniels and Keith Allen.

== Plot ==
John Gold (Barrett), an ex-soldier turned mercenary, learns of the murder of comrade Dan Mason. He sets off on a mission to the town of Devotion find out what happens, uncovering a sinister conspiracy in his old military unit, which he determines to clear up, taking down those responsible, one by one.

== Cast ==
- Wade Barrett (credited as Stu Bennett) as John Gold
- Gary Daniels as Hatcher
- Anna Shaffer as Sandra
- Sapphire Elia as Rose
- Abby Mavers as Lucy
- Bryan Larkin as Marshall
- Keith Allen as Dougie Mason (Dan's father)
- Fleur Keith as Barnes
- Kevin Leslie as Dan Mason
- Sean Blowers as Bruce
- Mark Griffin as Frost
- Sebastian Knapp as Keith

== Reception ==
The film has a 38% rating on Rotten Tomatoes. Noel Murray of the Los Angeles Times gave the film a negative review and wrote, "Aside from the British accents, there's nothing here to distinguish I Am Vengeance from any '80s/'90s straight-to-video fodder." Bobby LePire of Film Threat gave the film 7 stars out of 10 and wrote, "I Am Vengeance does not break the mold, but it uses its tried and true formula to good effect. Decent action, interesting characters, and a fantastic cast make for a fun watch."

== Sequel ==
The film spawned a sequel I Am Vengeance: Retaliation (2020) with Ross Boyask returning as screenwriter and director and Wade Barrett reprising his role as John Gold.
