= Deadly Target =

- Film poster
- Directed by: Charla Driver
- Written by: Michael January; James Adelstein
- Produced by: Joseph Merhi; Richard Pepin
- Starring: Gary Daniels; Ken McLeod; Max Gail; Byron Mann; Susan Byun
- Cinematography: Richard Pepin
- Edited by: John Dagnen; Fred Roth
- Music by: Michael J. Lewis
- Production company: PM Entertainment
- Distributed by: PM Entertainment
- Release date: November 9, 1994
- Running time: 128 minutes
- Countries: United States; Hong Kong
- Language: English

Deadly Target (also known as Fire Zone) is a 1994 martial arts action crime film directed by Charla Driver. It stars Gary Daniels, Ken McLeod, Max Gail, Byron Mann and Susan Byun.

== Plot ==
Hong Kong police detective Charles Prince (Gary Daniels) arrives in Los Angeles to extradite a notorious Chinese gangster back to Hong Kong for trial. But soon, his suspect escapes. With the help of renegade cop Jim Jenson (Ken McLeod) and beautiful Pai Gow dealer Diana Tang (Susan Byun), Prince tracks the ruthless gangster down. Soon, Prince, Jenson, and Tang get caught in the middle of an explosive Triad Gang War that leaves Chinatown drenched in blood and littered with bodies.

== Cast ==
- Gary Daniels as Charles Prince
- Ken McLeod as Jim Jenson
- Byron Mann as Chang
- Susan Byun as Diana Tang
- Max Gail as Captain Peters
- Ron Yuan as "Lucky"
- Lydia Look as Mei
- Aki Aleong as Xiong
- Timothy Dang as Choy
- Philip Tan as Han
- Robert Kim as Kuong
- James Wing Woo as Chen
- Rick Mali as Lee
- Bill M. Ryusaki as Zhou
- Addison Randall as Inspector
- Richard Beatty as Rick, Cop
- Wendy MacDonald as Barmaid
- Joe Kuroda as Man #1
- George Cheung as Man #2
- Al Leong as Guard
- Leo Lee as Leader
- Shakti as Lady
- Lisa Larosa as Waitress
- Chuck Borden as Terrorist
- Marta Merrifield as Court Reporter
