= Reptilicant =

Reptilicant is an action film released in 2006 that stars Gary Daniels and Tina-Desiree Berg. The rest of the cast includes Desi Singh, Jason Johnson, Paul Darrigo and Darryl Phinnessee. Desi Singh also directed the film.
