= Sam Benjamin =

British actor

- Born: 15 May 1986 (age 39); Birkenhead, England
- Occupations: Actor; writer; producer
- Years active: 2008–present

Sam Benjamin (born 15 May 1986) is a British actor and screenwriter best known for his appearance in the television series The Few.

Prior to finding work as an actor, Benjamin worked as a bartender in Birkenhead, England. While taking a summer training class, he was taught Shakespeare by Patrick Stewart and went on to land a spot at Drama Studio London. He made his first appearance in an episode of the documentary Andy McNab's Tour of Duty before appearing in small roles on British television series, including Little Crackers and Old Jack's Boat. In 2016, he co-wrote, co-produced, and starred in the web series The Few, which is about working class Londoners who gained superpowers, with Sam Bradford, and made an appearance on Peaky Blinders. He also appeared in episodes of Doctor Who and The War of the Worlds.

Although Benjamin only had a small role in the film Justice League (and by extension Zack Snyder's Justice League), fans speculated that Benjamin's character would make an appearance in future films in the series as Hal Jordan / Green Lantern, which Benjamin denied when Snyder's version of the film was released.

In 2020, Benjamin played the role of "Shapiro" in I Am Vengeance: Retaliation, and Variety noted that "it’s a pity the movie didn’t make more of the chemistry generated between [Phoebe] Robinson-Galvin and Benjamin."
