= Tekken 2: Kazuya's Revenge =

- Singaporean theatrical release poster
- Directed by: Wych Kaos
- Written by: Nicole Jones; Steven Paul
- Based on: Tekken by Bandai Namco Games
- Produced by: Steven Paul; Pimol Srivikorn
- Starring: Kane Kosugi; Cary-Hiroyuki Tagawa; Rade Šerbedžija; Gary Daniels; Kelly Wenham
- Cinematography: Wych Kaos
- Edited by: Vance Null; Robert Ferretti
- Music by: Misha Segal
- Production company: Crystal Sky Pictures
- Distributed by: SP Distribution
- Release dates: August 6, 2014 (Philippines); August 12, 2014 (United States)
- Running time: 89 minutes
- Country: United States
- Language: English
- Box office: $9,240 (Singapore)

Tekken 2: Kazuya's Revenge (alternately titled as Tekken: A Man Called X) is a 2014 American martial arts film directed by Wych Kaos and written by Nicole Jones and Steven Paul, based on the video game series Tekken published by Bandai Namco Games. The film serves as a prequel to Tekken: Hegemony (2009). It stars Kane Kosugi, Rade Šerbedžija, and Kelly Wenham. Cary-Hiroyuki Tagawa and Gary Daniels reprise their roles as Heihachi Mishima and Bryan Fury, respectively. Tekken 2: Kazuya's Revenge was released direct-to-video in the United States on August 12, 2014, by SP Distribution.

== Plot ==
A tall Japanese young male with no recollection of his past wakes up in an apartment in a district outside Tekken City before he is chased by armed men and nabbed by a femme fatale assassin named Rhona Anders.

He is brought to a guerrilla leader known as "The Minister", who gives him the letter "K" as his codename and has an explosive surgically implanted in his chest, should he fail his mission or attempt to leave the organization.

Despite his amnesia, "K" displays exceptional expertise in hand-to-hand combat and marksmanship skills. He befriends the district's local janitor, whose son killed his wife and crippled him before disappearing three years prior.

After defeating an opponent in a sparring match, "K" is ordered by the Minister to kill him or the janitor; "K" declines and tells the Minister to let the janitor go, to which the Minister's henchman breaks the defeated opponent's neck.

Over the next few days, "K" has been given an apartment to unit where he plots his next targets. He befriends a young female tenant named Laura after rescuing her from being victimized by a couple of muggers. After one of his jobs, he tells Rhona he wants out.

Recalling the events from where he first woke up, "K" returns to the apartment building from the beginning of the film and asks the manager for records on his previous stay, to which the manager only has him signed under the initials "K. M."

On his next job, "K" battles and is defeated by his target, Bryan Fury, who warns him to walk away from his job before disappearing. The next morning, "K" confronts Rhona about Fury, who is revealed to be a former associate of the Minister. As Laura is a nurse, "K" has her remove the explosive from his chest.

"K" receives a call from Fury, who warns him that the Minister has "K" marked as a target. He meets up with Rhona that night before they both encounter Fury, who shows them a newspaper article and tells them they are all pawns of the Minister.

Later, Rhona stabs the Minister in the back, but "K" later on discovers that Laura has been abducted by Gentek Factory. The duo infiltrate into Gentek, where Rhona butts heads with the Minister's other femme fatale assassin duo (who were both apparently modeled after Anna Williams and Nina Williams).

Inside of the factory, "K" meets Heihachi Mishima, who reveals that "K" is his biological son Kazuya Mishima. Like the ancient Spartans sending their male children to the wilderness to survive alone, Heihachi had Kazuya brainwashed and set loose to test his survival skills.

Heihachi is also showing Laura who has been brainwashed as well; this brain manipulation process has drastically altered her personality from a lovely and kind into a seductive woman. An enraged Kazuya witnesses Heihachi eliminating Laura at a moment's notice just after sharing a kiss with her.

Kazuya is then challenged by two formidable martial artists named Rip and Thorn. After being the victor of this final fight, Kazuya accepts his bloodline and has Rhona accompany him to find Heihachi, who stands over the skyline of Tekken City.

== Cast ==
- Kane Kosugi as Kazuya Mishima (commonly referred to as "K")
- Cary-Hiroyuki Tagawa as Heihachi Mishima
- Gary Daniels as Bryan Fury
- Rade Šerbedžija as The Minister
- Kelly Wenham as Rhona Anders
- Paige Lindquist as Laura
- Charlotte Kirk as Chloe the Schoolgirl Assassin
- Biljana Misic as Natashia the Serbian Assassin
- Sahajak Boonthanakit as The Janitor
- Ron Smoorenburg as Thorn
- Russell Geoffrey Banks as Jimmy the Thief
- Eoin O'Brien as Ezra
- Brahim Achabbakhe as Rip
- Abishek J. Bajaj as The Apartment Manager

== Reception ==
Manly Movie gave the film a score of 3 out of 10, commenting that:

"It's like the producers and writers have no idea who these characters are, and had no intention of giving a crap, but were advised that certain actors were free for a cameo – use them."
