= Gary Daniels =

British actor (born 1963)

- Born: Gary Edward Daniels; 9 May 1963 (age 63); Woking, Surrey, England
- Height: 5 ft 11 in (1.80 m)
- Weight: 180 lb (82 kg)
- Division: Middleweight; Light Heavyweight
- Reach: 77.5 in (197 cm)
- Style: Kickboxing, Muay Thai, taekwondo
- Stance: Southpaw
- Team: The Jet Center; Piston Kickboxing Gym
- Trainer: Mickey Byrne; Yukio Horiuchi; Benny Urquidez
- Rank: 2nd degree black belt in taekwondo
- Years active: 1979–present

Kickboxing record
- Total: 24
- Wins: 22
- By knockout: 21
- Losses: 2

Amateur record
- Total: 35
- Wins: 31
- By knockout: 30
- Losses: 4

Other information
- Occupation: Actor, martial artist
- Spouse: Mericine
- Children: 5

Gary Edward Daniels (born 9 May 1963) is an English actor and martial artist. Originally a kickboxer fighting out of London and Tampa Bay, Daniels earned his first acting credits with Philippine companies. He gained wider recognition in the manga adaptations City Hunter, opposite Jackie Chan, and Fist of the North Star, in a starring role. During the 1990s, he toplined many independent action pictures, most notably those of PM Entertainment. In later years, Daniels has been featured in more mainstream American fare, such as the two Tekken live action movies and the all-star vehicle The Expendables.

== Early life ==
Gary Daniels was born on May 9, 1963, in Woking, Surrey, England. He grew up in the west London town of Hayes. He played football from the age of 5, and was on nearby Watford F.C.'s scouting list until the age of 14. After seeing a preview of Enter the Dragon on television at age 8, Daniels asked his father to take him to a martial arts club, and the elder Daniels took on the sport on the same day to encourage his son. Before breaking through as an actor, he supported himself as a nightclub bouncer and dancer.

== Martial arts ==
Daniels started at the local Hayes Kung-fu Club, working under trainers Jim Russell and Lajos Jakab. They taught a style called "Mongolian kung-fu", which in practice turned out to be a mix of karate, judo and aikido geared towards self defense. Finding his kicking abilities underused in this style, Daniels moved to taekwondo under trainer Raymond Choi at around 12 or 13, and received his black belt within three years. However, his aggressive style caused him to get disqualified from several ITF tournaments. At 14, he sought a second trainer in Mickey Byrne, a striking specialist and military instructor working out of a gym at Brunel University, with the goal of entering the then nascent sport of kickboxing with the PKA. Daniels started fighting on British PKA shows at 17 and spent two to three years on that circuit. Among the seven fights he had there, he claims a draw against the organization's world middleweight champion. However, fights paid poorly and were hard to come by.

Just after his 20th birthday in 1983, he emigrated to the U.S. with only a few hundred pounds in his pockets, settling in Tampa, Florida, on the advice of British PKA promoter George Stefas, who considered it the best compromise between talent pool and cost of living. There he started training under karate instructors John and Jim Graden, as well as teaching at St. Petersburg Junior College. He also trained under their mentor Joe Lewis, who lived in the area at the time, but was not a longtime student of his. However, U.S. purses were not what Daniels had hoped for and he found it difficult to pay for travel expenses. As a result, he mostly stuck to the Florida scene. However points karate, which he disliked, was much more prevalent than full contact at the time, and he quit after a couple unsuccessful tournaments. Despite early misgivings, he also trained in Ninjutsu for about a year, first under a trainer named Mark Russo, and then his mentor Steven Hayes.

Around 1986, Daniels flew down to the Philippines to explore acting opportunities, and remained there for two years. He returned to the U.S. in 1988 and moved to California the following year to further his film career. Shortly after, he was introduced to Winston "Omega" Wong, a Malaysian of Chinese descent. He also got back into Muay Thai and kickboxing, joining Benny Urquidez's Jet Center for about a year, and training with various fighters including Pete Cunningham and Stan Longinidis. Daniels also had a stint at Yukio "Little Piston" Horiuchi's Piston Gym in Fountain Valley. He briefly returned to competition for Horiuchi's World Kick Boxing Association (California), a regional offshoot of the Japan-based WKBA, winning the Californian light heavyweight title in November 1990 against Bob Smith. This led to further opportunities in Hollywood, and he stepped away from prizefighting due to scheduling conflicts. Thereafter, Daniels trained exclusively with Omega.

On 23 November 1991, at the World Martial Arts Extravaganza in Birmingham, England, Daniels took part in a three-round, no-decision kickboxing exhibition with 11-time world champion Don "The Dragon" Wilson, to promote their film Ring of Fire. Feeling that he had never retired from fighting, but rather been on leave from it due to the financial security afforded by film, Daniels made the best of an acting lull and started attending fight camps in Thailand in 2004, occasionally training with WMC figure Stephan Fox. He has taken part in a few impromptu contests while there, the last on record being a five-round decision loss at the age of 45, against a substantially younger opponent. He has declared that he considered himself retired since then.

== Film ==
Daniels grew up a martial arts film enthusiast and accrued a large knowledge of the genre, later contributing opinions to the filmography segment of John Corcoran's Martial Arts Sourcebook. When he arrived in Tampa Bay at age 20, Daniels started taking acting lessons at Kathy Laughlin's Performers' Studio Workshop. He found a few commercials and bit parts locally, including in a Miami Vice episode and the film Cocoon, the latter of which was cut. In 1986, he asked a Filipino friend if he could pitch his demo tape to the film companies of his native country. He accepted an invitation from a director who turned out to be a fraud, but stayed there and was later scouted by Solar Films, whose wealthy Chinese owner Wilson Tieng was looking for Caucasian actors to expand into the international market. He was given six-picture contract but after two, he was asked to do a softcore movie and walked out.

Daniels returned to Florida in 1988. His fortunes changed in 1989 when he met Roy Horan. Horan put him in contact with agent "Hilly" Elkins, who had an affinity for English talent. Elkins signed him up to his Los Angeles-based firm and Daniels relocated to the area. In 1990, he was signed to a four-picture deal with Cinema City of Hong Kong, but it went out of business soon after. By that time, the success of Bloodsport had opened the door for real-life martial artists to appear in movies. He was offered $50,000 to star in Death Touch for Menahem Golan's new company 21st Century, but it was cancelled. After he won a regional WKBA belt, Elkins sent him to an audition for the PM Entertainment film Ring of Fire. This was his first featured role in the U.S., and earned him a SAG card.

Daniels' first American starring roles came in a series of co-productions between the Philippines' Silver Star company and their American partners Cine Excel, starting with 1991's Capital Punishment. Although they were of a very low standard, Daniels struck a friendship with Cine Excel boss David Huey and kept working with him over the years. In 1992, Daniels traveled to Japan and Hong Kong for an adaptation of City Hunter starring Jackie Chan, an early breakthrough alongside one of his favorite action stars. The Briton also took advantage of a break in filming to appear opposite Moon Lee in Mission of Justice. In 1993, Daniels played the Malibu Comics character Hardcase in a promotional short by music video director Darren Doane. Concurrently, he entered his first multi-picture deal with PM Entertainment, graduating to co-starring and, soon after, leading roles for the company with 1994's Deadly Target.

Meanwhile, Daniels started pitching a potential franchise character for himself called Union Jack, a former British Army sergeant with James Bond-like qualities, who became the bodyguard to a rich heiress. He was signed to a three-picture deal with British-owned Overseas Filmgroup, of which Union Jack was meant to be the first. That project did not pan out but Overseas, who frequently co-produced with Japan, was contacted by the Toei Company to help make a live action version of Fist of the North Star. Daniels, a fan of the anime, was offered for the role. While the latter feels that a theatrical release, which was at one point considered, could have changed his career, the film's strong video performance, particularly in Asia, still established him as a bankable name.

Daniels soldiered on with a new PM Entertainment contract, which saw him star in an informal trilogy known internally at PM as the "Three Rs": Rage (1995), Riot (1996) and Recoil (1998). They are often seen as the company's peak thanks to large scale stunts devised by Spiro Razatos. Aspects of his dream character Union Jack resurfaced in other projects, especially the two Queen's Messenger movies made for Harry Alan Towers. Daniels also reunited with Darren Doane, the director of his Hardcase short, for two features, Ides of March, which went unreleased due to legal issues, and Black Friday, which saw him debut as a main producer.

The early 2000s marked an end to the lucrative cable and foreign sales that had cemented Daniels' leading man career. Still working for producers Joseph Merhi and Avi Lerner, he found himself booked as the antagonist in more upmarket films headlined by former studio players, Retrograde with Dolph Lundgren and Submerged with Steven Seagal. However, those changed power dynamics resulted in both of his characters being altered for the worse. After a few lean years, Daniels received high-profile roles in 2009's Tekken and 2010's The Expendables thanks to friends Mike Norris and Chad Stahelski. He had better luck this time around, as his characters gained in relevance during the making of the films.

In 2012, Daniels delivered a more subdued performance in the crime drama Angels, in a role written against type by his friend Wych Kaosayananda. The film's lack of commercial appeal lead to action-oriented reshoots with Scott Adkins and a rebrand as Zero Tolerance, much to Daniels' disappointment. However, the director's cut still saw release in Vietnam thanks to co-star Dustin Nguyen's presence, and Daniels was booked for another dramatic role in Farewell, Berlin Wall, a German-Vietnamese co-production which was selected for the 2015 Busan Film Festival. In 2018, Daniels was cast by Ross Boyask, whom he had mentored during his days as an amateur filmmaker, as the main antagonist of his first mainstream feature I Am Vengeance, opposite wrestler Stu Bennett.

== Personal life ==
Daniels met his wife in the Philippines, and she later followed him to the U.S. His first son Shane is a stuntman who has competed on the TV show American Ninja Warrior. His second son, Kenshiro, named after his Fist of the North Star character, has played professional association football in the Philippines. He also has a daughter.

== Titles ==
- 1990 WKBA (California) Light Heavyweight Champion

== Filmography ==
=== Film ===
Year	Title	Role	Notes
1988	Final Reprisal	David Callahan	First lead role
1988	The Secret of King Mahis Island	Chuck	
1991	Ring of Fire	Bud	
1991	In Between	The Guardian	
1991	Capital Punishment	James Thayer	
1992	Jin san jiao qun ying hui	Martial Artist in Prologue	Known in English as Mission of Justice
1992	Final Impact	Nick's Club Fighter	
1992	Deadly Bet	Fletch	
1992	Bloodfist IV: Die Trying	Scarface	Also known as Die Trying
1992	American Streetfighter	Jake Tanner	Also fight choreographer
1993	City Hunter	Kim	
1993	Full Impact	Jared Taskin	Also fight choreographer
1993	Hardcase	Tom Hawke / Hardcase	Short film
1993	Knights	David	
1993	Firepower	Nick Sledge	
1994	Deadly Target	Charles Prince	
1995	Fist of the North Star	Kenshiro	
1995	Heatseeker	Xao	
1995	Rage	Alex Gainer	Also associate producer
1996	White Tiger	Mike Ryan	
1996	Hawk's Vengeance	Eric "Hawk" Kelly	Also fight choreographer
1997	Bloodmoon	Ken O'Hara	Also associate producer
1997	Pocket Ninjas	The White Dragon	Filmed in 1994
1997	Riot	Maj. Shane Alcott	
1998	Recoil	Det. Ray Morgan	Also associate producer
1998	Spoiler	Roger Mason	
1999	No Tomorrow	Jason	
1999	Cold Harvest	Roland Chaney / Oliver Chaney	
1999	Delta Force One: The Lost Patrol	Capt. James Wellford	
2000	Epicenter	Nick Constantine	
2000	The Ides of March	Thomas Cane	Also known as Ultimate Target; Unreleased domestically
2000	City of Fear	Steve Roberts	
2000	Fatal Blade	Richard Fox	Also associate producer
2001	Queen's Messenger	Capt. Anthony Strong	
2001	Witness to a Kill	Capt. Anthony Strong	Also known as Queen's Messenger 2
2002	Black Friday	Dean Campbell	Also producer
2004	Retrograde	Markus	
2005	Submerged	Col. John Sharpe	
2006	Reptilicant	Ryan Moore	
2008	Dark Secrets	Darryl Van Dyke	Also known as Cold Earth
2009	Immortally Yours	Sebastian	
2009	La Linea	Martin	
2009	Tekken	Bryan Fury	
2010	Game of Death	Zander	
2010	The Expendables	Lawrence "The Brit" Sparks	
2010	Hunt to Kill	Jensen	
2010	Across the Line	Michaels	
2010	The Lazarus Papers	Sebastian Riker	
2011	Johnny's Gone	Roy	
2011	Forced To Fight	Shane	Also fight choreographer
2012	The Mark	Joseph Pike	
2012	A Stranger in Paradise	Derek	
2012	The Encounter: Paradise Lost	Charlie Doles	
2012	The Mark: Redemption	Joseph Pike	
2012	The Rogue	Kiefer	
2012	Liberty	Agent Gunner	
2013	Human Factor	Chad	
2013	Santa's Summer House	Dean	
2014	Tekken 2: Kazuya's Revenge	Bryan Fury	
2014	Quyên	Hans	Known in English as Farewell, Berlin Wall
2014	Misfire	Cole	
2015	Skin Traffik	Bradley	
2015	Angels	Sammy	Partially re-shot and released in most territories as Zero Tolerance or 2 Guns: Zero Tolerance
2015	Dancin': It's On!	Jerry August	
2016	The Wrong Child	Charles	
2016	Rumble	David Goran	
2018	I Am Vengeance	Hatcher	
2018	Astro	Jack Adams	
2021	The Gardener	Volker	
2022	Bring Him Back Dead	Alex	
2022	Repeater	Henrik Botha	

=== Television ===
Year	Title	Role	Notes
1986	Miami Vice	Male stripper	Episode: "Walk-Alone"; Uncredited
1999	Sons of Thunder	Lannark	Episode: "Daddy's Girl"
2008	The Legend of Bruce Lee	Elliott	2 episodes
2013	Payday	Hector	Web miniseries Episode: "Hector"
2016	Mortal Kombat X: Generations	Kano	Also known as Mortal Kombat: Legacy season 3 Web miniseries Episode: "Mission Fatigue"; Unreleased
2016	The Wrong Child	Charles	Television film
2021	Kung Fu	Master Drake	2 episodes

== Work cited ==
- Gary Daniels: Evolution of a Fighter (DVD featurette). United Kingdom: Hong Kong Legends. 2000. UPC 5032438504633.
- Adkins, Scott (host) (29 October 2020). "Gary Daniels". The Art of Action. Episode 22.
