= The Fix (2019 TV series) =

2019 American legal drama television series

- Genre: Drama
- Created by: Marcia Clark; Elizabeth Craft; Sarah Fain
- Starring: Robin Tunney; Adewale Akinnuoye-Agbaje; Adam Rayner; Merrin Dungey; Marc Blucas
- Composer: Gregory Tripi
- Country of origin: United States
- Original language: English
- No. of seasons: 1
- No. of episodes: 10

Production
- Executive producers: David Hoberman; Elizabeth Craft; Laurie Zaks; Marcia Clark; Sarah Fain; Todd Lieberman
- Cinematography: Eric Steelberg (1x01 only); Robert Humphreys
- Editors: Brad Katz; Jan Northrop; Roy C. Poole; Kurt Courtland; Julia Franklin
- Running time: 42–43 minutes
- Production companies: Happier in Hollywood; Mandeville Television; ABC Studios

Original release
- Network: ABC
- Release: March 18 – May 20, 2019

The Fix is an American legal drama series that premiered on March 18, 2019 on ABC. On May 15, 2018, it was scheduled for midseason 2018–19 television season.

On May 10, 2019, ABC canceled the series after one season.

== Cast ==
=== Main ===
- Robin Tunney as Maya Travis, a former Los Angeles assistant district attorney (DA) whose career was ruined by her failure to successfully prosecute a famous actor for murder, only to find herself investigating him eight years later for another murder.
- Adewale Akinnuoye-Agbaje as Sevvy Johnson, an A-list actor acquitted of killing his girlfriend and another woman, but at the cost of his fame and reputation. He now finds himself under suspicion for the death of his new girlfriend, Jessica Meyer.
- Adam Rayner as Matthew Collier, an assistant DA and Maya's old colleague who appoints her to lead the investigation into Meyer's death.
- Merrin Dungey as (Carisa) C.J. Emerson, a senior investigator for the DA's office.
- Breckin Meyer as Alan "Charlie" Wiest, the Los Angeles district attorney who generally delegates most of his responsibilities to his subordinates, and who seems more interested in protecting his job than in prosecuting Johnson.
- Marc Blucas as River "Riv" Allgood, Maya's boyfriend and the owner of a horse farm.
- Mouzam Makkar as Loni Kampour, Maya's successor as assistant DA who maintains a corrupt association with defense lawyer Ezra Wolf.
- Alex Saxon as Gabriel Johnson, Sevvy's stepson.
- Scott Cohen as Ezra Wolf, a celebrity lawyer known as the "Wolfman" for his aggressive style who was responsible for getting Johnson cleared of murder charges. He once again comes to his old client's defense after he is accused of a new murder, but with ulterior motives.

=== Recurring ===
- Taylor Kalupa as Jessica Meyer, Johnson's girlfriend whose death triggers a new police investigation into his life.
- Robin Givens as Julianne Johnson, Johnson's ex-wife who extorts money from her former husband to defend him in the media.
- Robbie Jones as Detective Vincent North, an investigating officer in the Meyer case.
- Vannessa Vasquez as Dia Briseño, a mistress of Johnson's who becomes an informant for the police.
- KJ Smith as Charlie
- Chasten Harmon as Star Johnson, Sevvy's oldest daughter.
- Robert Wisdom as Buck Neal, a professional fixer employed by Wolf.
- Daniella Alonso as Effy, Matthew's wife.
- Erik Palladino as Leo Foster, a security guard at the DA's office.
- Molly C. Quinn as Lindsay Meyer, Jessica's sister.
- Skye P. Marshall as Angela Ashley
- Abraham Lim as Ares Ahn, Wolf's associate.
- Mitchell Edwards as Sevvy Johnson Jr, Sevvy's son.
- Cranston Johnson as James Meloy
- Lynn Collins as Dr. Carys Daly
- Bianca Lopez as Flight Attendant Marie
- Alyssa Owens as Sunny Johnson, Sevvy's youngest daughter.
- Lissa Pallo as Elaine Paxon.

== Episodes ==
| No. | Title | Directed by | Written by | Original release date | U.S. viewers (millions) |
|---|---|---|---|---|---|
| 1 | "Pilot" | Larysa Kondracki | Marcia Clark & Elizabeth Craft & Sarah Fain | March 18, 2019 | 4.40 |
In 2010, Hollywood actor Severen "Sevvy" Johnson is acquitted of murder; the prosecuting attorney, Maya Travis, resigns in disgrace. Eight years later, Johnson comes under suspicion in the murder of his girlfriend, Jessica Meyer. Maya, who has been living in seclusion in Washington, agrees to assist her former partner, Matthew Collier, in the investigation. Maya is doubtful that Johnson is guilty, and plans to leave Los Angeles quickly. Sevvy seeks assistance from the lawyer who previously got him acquitted, Ezra Wolf, who is drowning in mob debts. Maya theorizes that Johnson killed Jessica when she rebelled against his controlling ways. Maya's boyfriend, Riv, shows up unannounced, and she informs him that she plans to stay and take on the case after all. Collier's investigator, C.J. Bernstein, finds a storage unit Johnson's daughter Star rented for Jessica, who recorded a video diary documenting Johnson's abuse. With it, the police are able to get a search warrant for his home. Collier names Maya lead prosecutor over assistant DA Loni Kampour, who retaliates by warning Wolf about the search. He in turn warns Sevvy, who asks his stepson Gabe to get rid of a black duffel bag.
| 2 | "Revenge" | Michael Katleman | Story by : Elizabeth Craft & Sarah Fain; Teleplay by : Marcia Clark | March 25, 2019 | 3.85 |
C.J. finds cash, keys, and a burner phone in Sunny Johnson's room, while Gabe buries the bag in the woods. Matthew wants to fight Wolf in the media, but Maya insists that they focus on the case. Wolf obtains incriminating evidence that potentially implicates a new suspect, Ben Mitchell. Sevvy agrees to Wolf's plan to have brunch with his family to influence the public; he uses knowledge of Star's betrayal to force her to attend. The key from Johnson's house turns out to belong to Ben, and a search of the burner phone turns up threatening messages towards Jessica. Maya tells Matthew that she can't believe Ben is the killer because she wants revenge on Johnson. Wolf, through Loni, learns about Mitchell's predicament. Star runs out on her father and later tells him that she believes he didn't kill Jessica. Terrified of arrest, Ben goes to a hotel, records a public confession, and commits suicide just as Maya obtains witness testimony exonerating him. Maya holds a press conference attacking Wolf for Ben's death and plays Jessica's video diary publicly. A disguised Sevvy attacks his mistress Dia, believing she might have killed Jessica out of jealousy.
| 3 | "The Wire" | Steve Robin | Jerome Schwartz & Denise Hahn | April 1, 2019 | 2.98 |
After Dia proves her innocence, Sevvy talks her into forgiving him. Maya finds a pair of earrings on her porch, matching dozens of other pairs she's received over the years from a stalker. His trust broken, Gabe leaves, leaving Sevvy fearful that he'll talk. C.J. and Maya take Dia into custody for an old offense, and with Loni's help persuade her to wear a wire for a meeting with Sevvy that night. Wolf blackmails his ex-wife, Sevvy's doctor, to sign an affidavit swearing that she treated his client on the day of the murder, which gives him an airtight alibi. Dia succumbs to guilt and tries to tip off Sevvy, but when Buck, Wolf's fixer, tries to pay her off to leave town, she snaps and drives to his mansion to confront him, allowing Maya and the others to learn about the fake alibi. Julianne rescues Gabe from a bar fight (that she arranged) and offers to help him. Maya informs Wolf that she intends to have him disbarred for misconduct. When he goes to Loni, she lies and says she knew nothing about the wire. Sevvy tries to fire Wolf and physically threatens him; to save himself, Wolf decides on a new strategy of going after Maya personally, and has Buck pose as a rancher to meet Riv.
| 4 | "Scandal" | Edward Ornelas | Wendy Mericle & Catherine LePard | April 8, 2019 | 3.23 |
C.J. finds a link between Jessica and Julianne, and the DA brings in a consultant to improve Maya's public image. Buck steals some video files for a smear campaign before Riv throws him off the property. A fake video showing Maya and Matthew having sex is leaked to the media by Wolf, who backs it up with photographic evidence from his associate Ares. A drunk Gabe admits to Star that he hid evidence; a tracker planted by her father alerts him that she wants to retrieve it. Under pressure from the mayor's office, DA Wiest fires Maya. Wolf gets Loni to tell him about Julianne and he visits her, but she refuses to tell him anything. Matthew arranges a televised interview with his wife so that Maya can win over the public. A furious Wolf dismisses Ares, before Riv shows up and slugs him. The mayor tells Wiest to rehire Maya. Star and Gab dig up the duffel bag; Gabe knocks out Sevvy with a shovel and Star burns the bag rather than lose her father. Loni tells Wolf to end their arrangement or she'll expose his financial problems, just as Maya deduces that there's a mole in the DA's office.
| 5 | "Lie to Me" | Wendey Stanzler | Ola Shokunbi | April 15, 2019 | 3.08 |
The DA's office goes on lockdown, with Collier assuming control as the search for the mole commences. Gabe drives off and Star calls Wolf and Buck for help. Loni erases Wolf's calls from her phone and steals pills to fool the lie detector. Despite learning that Sevvy has a concussion, Wolf refuses to let him go to the hospital. Gabe goes to Maya with his story and she asks CJ to verify it. Riv visits and on the way out, CJ informs him of Maya's stalker. The team finds evidence on a suspect, Calvin Taylor, whose DNA was found on Jessica's car, as well as the blood from where Gabe hit Sevvy. Collier catches Loni lying during the test, but decides to cover for her to avoid jeopardizing the case. CJ goes to see "Calvin" (which turns out to be Buck's real name) while Maya recovers photos of Jessica that he took while working for Sevvy. Gabe agrees to testify against his stepfather, but Wolf gets him arrested by having Star report him for assault. Collier finds a bug in the office, which Loni swears she knew nothing about. Maya finds a piece of evidence that seemingly proves Sevvy's guilt. Feeling the walls close in, Sevvy prepares to flee the country to avoid arrest.
| 6 | "The Fugitive" | Stacey K. Black | Denise Hahn | April 22, 2019 | 3.11 |
| 7 | "Ghost Whisperer" | Randy Zisk | Catherine LePard | April 29, 2019 | 2.77 |
| 8 | "Queen for a Day" | Michael Katleman | Brook Sitgraves Turner | May 6, 2019 | 2.18 |
| 9 | "Jeopardy!" | Silver Tree | Corey Miller | May 13, 2019 | 2.42 |
| 10 | "Making a Murderer" | Michael Katleman | Story by : Marcia Clark; Teleplay by : Elizabeth Craft & Sarah Fain | May 20, 2019 | 2.90 |

== Release ==
=== Marketing ===
On May 15, 2018, ABC released the first official trailer for the series.

== Reception ==
=== Critical response ===
On review aggregator Rotten Tomatoes, the series holds an approval rating of 60% based on 15 reviews, with an average rating of 5.68/10. The website's critical consensus reads, "Powerful performances by Robin Tunney and Adewale Akinnuoye-Agbaje will give viewers their drama Fix, but the series' concept will strike many viewers as a self-serving rewrite of recent history." On Metacritic, it has a weighted average score of 52 out of 100, based on 10 critics, indicating "mixed or average reviews".

=== Ratings ===
Viewership and ratings per episode of The Fix
| No. | Title | Air date | Rating/share (18–49) | Viewers (millions) | DVR (18–49) | DVR viewers (millions) | Total (18–49) | Total viewers (millions) |
|---|---|---|---|---|---|---|---|---|
| 1 | "Pilot" | March 18, 2019 | 0.7/4 | 4.40 | 0.5 | 3.32 | 1.2 | 7.71 |
| 2 | "Revenge" | March 25, 2019 | 0.6/3 | 3.85 | 0.4 | 2.66 | 1.0 | 6.51 |
| 3 | "The Wire" | April 1, 2019 | 0.5/3 | 2.98 | 0.3 | 2.36 | 0.8 | 5.34 |
| 4 | "Scandal" | April 8, 2019 | 0.5/3 | 3.23 | 0.3 | 2.27 | 0.8 | 5.50 |
| 5 | "Lie to Me" | April 15, 2019 | 0.5/3 | 3.08 | 0.3 | 2.16 | 0.8 | 5.24 |
| 6 | "The Fugitive" | April 22, 2019 | 0.5/3 | 3.11 | 0.3 | 2.04 | 0.8 | 5.15 |
| 7 | "Ghost Whisperer" | April 29, 2019 | 0.4/2 | 2.77 | 0.3 | 2.10 | 0.7 | 4.88 |
| 8 | "Queen for a Day" | May 6, 2019 | 0.3/2 | 2.18 | 0.4 | 2.09 | 0.7 | 4.27 |
| 9 | "Jeopardy!" | May 13, 2019 | 0.4/3 | 2.42 | 0.3 | 2.11 | 0.7 | 4.53 |
| 10 | "Making a Murderer" | May 20, 2019 | 0.5/3 | 2.90 | 0.3 | 2.03 | 0.7 | 4.88 |
