= I Am Vengeance: Retaliation =

2020 British action film

- Film poster
- Directed by: Ross Boyask
- Written by: Ross Boyask
- Produced by: John Adams; Diane Shorthouse
- Starring: Wade Barrett; Vinnie Jones
- Cinematography: Simon Rowling
- Edited by: Ross Boyask
- Music by: Thomas Andrew Gallegos
- Production company: Evolutionary Films
- Distributed by: Lionsgate; Saban Films
- Release dates: 19 June 2020 (United States); 13 July 2020 (United Kingdom)
- Running time: 82 minutes
- Country: United Kingdom
- Language: English

I Am Vengeance: Retaliation is a 2020 British action film written and directed by Ross Boyask and starring Wade Barrett (reprising his role as John Gold) and Vinnie Jones. It is the sequel to Boyask's 2018 film I Am Vengeance.

== Cast ==
- Wade Barrett (credited as Stu Bennett) as John Gold
- Vinnie Jones as Sean Teague
- Mark Griffin as Frost
- Katrina Durden as Jen Quaid
- Phoebe Robinson-Galvin as Kate Lynch
- Sam Benjamin as Shapiro
- David Schaal as Commander Grayson
- Jessica-Jane Stafford as Pearl
- Bentley Kalu as Renner
- Jean Paul Ly as Kelso

== Release ==
The film was released to digital on demand and digital platforms on 19 June 2020 in the United States and on 13 July 2020 in the United Kingdom. It was later released to DVD and Blu-Ray in the United States on 11 August 2020.

== Reception ==
The film has a 44% rating on Rotten Tomatoes, based on nine reviews with an average rating of 5.2/10. Tom Cassidy of Common Sense Media awarded the film three stars out of five.
