= Retrograde (2004 film) =

- Official DVD cover
- Directed by: Christopher Kulikowski
- Screenplay by: Tom Reeve; Gianluca Curti
- Story by: Christopher Kulikowski
- Produced by: Gianluca Curti; Tom Reeve; Jamie Treacher
- Starring: Dolph Lundgren; Gary Daniels
- Cinematography: Carlo Thiel
- Edited by: Peter Davies
- Music by: Stephen Melillo (as Emilio Maccolini)
- Distributed by: Franchise Pictures
- Release date: November 2, 2004
- Running time: 93 minutes
- Countries: Italy; Luxembourg; United States
- Language: English

Retrograde is a 2004 American science fiction action film directed by Christopher Kulikowski and starring Dolph Lundgren. The film was released theatrically in South Korea on 14 January 2005. It was shot in Italy and Luxembourg.

== Plot ==
When a deadly microorganism threatens to wipe out the entire human race, the only hope for the future of mankind is to send a special team of soldiers back in time to prevent the virus from ever coming into existence. The year is 2204. Humankind is under attack from a fast-spreading super-bug that now threatens to destroy the very fabric of human civilization. The only hope lies with Captain John Foster (Dolph Lundgren) and his elite squad of genetically resistant soldiers. Captain Foster's mission: travel back into the past, and ensure that the first infection never happens. Now, as Captain Foster's team races to save the world, they realize that their actions in the present could yield dire consequences for the future.

== Cast ==
- Dolph Lundgren as Captain John Foster
- Silvia De Santis as Dr. Renee Diaz
- Joe Montana as Dalton
- Gary Daniels as Markus
- Joe Sagal as Andrew Schrader
- Ken Samuels as Captain Robert Davis
- David Jean Thomas as Jefferson
- Jamie Treacher as Mackenzie
- Marco Lorenzini as Bruce Ross
- Scott Joseph as Greg
- Adrian Sellars as Keith
- James Chalke as Vacceri
- Nicolas de Pruyssenaer as Ichek
- Dean Gregory as Central Command Leader
- Derek Kueter as Charley

== Production ==
=== Filming ===
Shot in Italy, the film received the support of the Film Fund of Luxembourg.
