= Hasyim =

Hasyim is an Indonesian male given name and surname, both spelling variants of the more common Indonesian spelling Hassim, which is a variant of the even more common Muslim male first name and surname Hashim. Unlike Hassim (usually also Indonesian but sometimes other Muslim languages also like Arabic), this spelling is very Indonesian and is never used in other non-Southeast Asian Muslim languages like Arabic or Urdu.

== First name ==
- Hasyim Asy'ari (1871–1947), Indonesian Muslim ulama (type of Muslim clergy) and founder of the Sunni Muslim Nahdatul Ulama movement.
- Hasyim Kipuw (born 1988), Indonesian professional football player for Bali United.
- Hasyim Muzadi (born 1944), Indonesian politician and former chairman of Nahdatul Ulama.

== Middle name ==
- Badr ul-Alam Syarif Hasyim Jamaluddin (died circa 1702/1717), eighteenth sultan of the Aceh Sultanate from 1699 to 1702.
- Hasyim Muzadi uses his middle name as his first name. His full name is Achmad Hasyim Muzadi.

== Surname ==
- Rina Hasyim (born 1947 as Rineke "Rina" Antoinette Hassim), Indonesian actress.
- Wahid Hasyim (1914–1953), Indonesia's first minister of religious affairs.

== See also ==
- Hassim
- Hashim
