= Final Reprisal =

Final Repsial
- Directed by: Teddy Page (as Tedd Hemingway)
- Written by: Rod Davis; James Gaines
- Starring: Gary Daniels; James Gaines
- Cinematography: Vic Sanders
- Edited by: Edgar Vincent
- Music by: Patrick Corman
- Production company: Solar Films
- Release date: May 25, 1988
- Running time: 88 minutes
- Country: Philippines
- Language: English

Final Reprisal is a 1988 action film directed by Teddy Page and starring Gary Daniels (in his first starring role) and James Gaines. It was shot in the Philippines, and released directly-to-video in the mid 1988.

== Plot ==
Sergeant David Callahan leads a task force of U.S. Marines sent in behind enemy lines to perform a secret mission. The mission becomes a failure, when commandos kill the daughter of powerful Captain Vinai. Five years later Callahan lives in Thailand, and works as a secret adviser of the Thai Special Forces. Unfinished feuds from Callahan's past return, and the soldier is forced to come back to the Vietnam administered POW camp he escaped years before, then fight off a deadly duel.

== Cast ==
- Gary Daniels as Sergeant David Callahan
- James Gaines as Charles Murphy
- David Light as Douglas Anderson
- Richard King as Captain Vinai
- Protacio Dee as Tran Van Phu
- Oscar Daniels as The Colonel
- Hassim Hassam as El Chameleon
- Peter Rise as Paul Callahan
