= Wade Barrett =

English professional wrestler (born 1980)

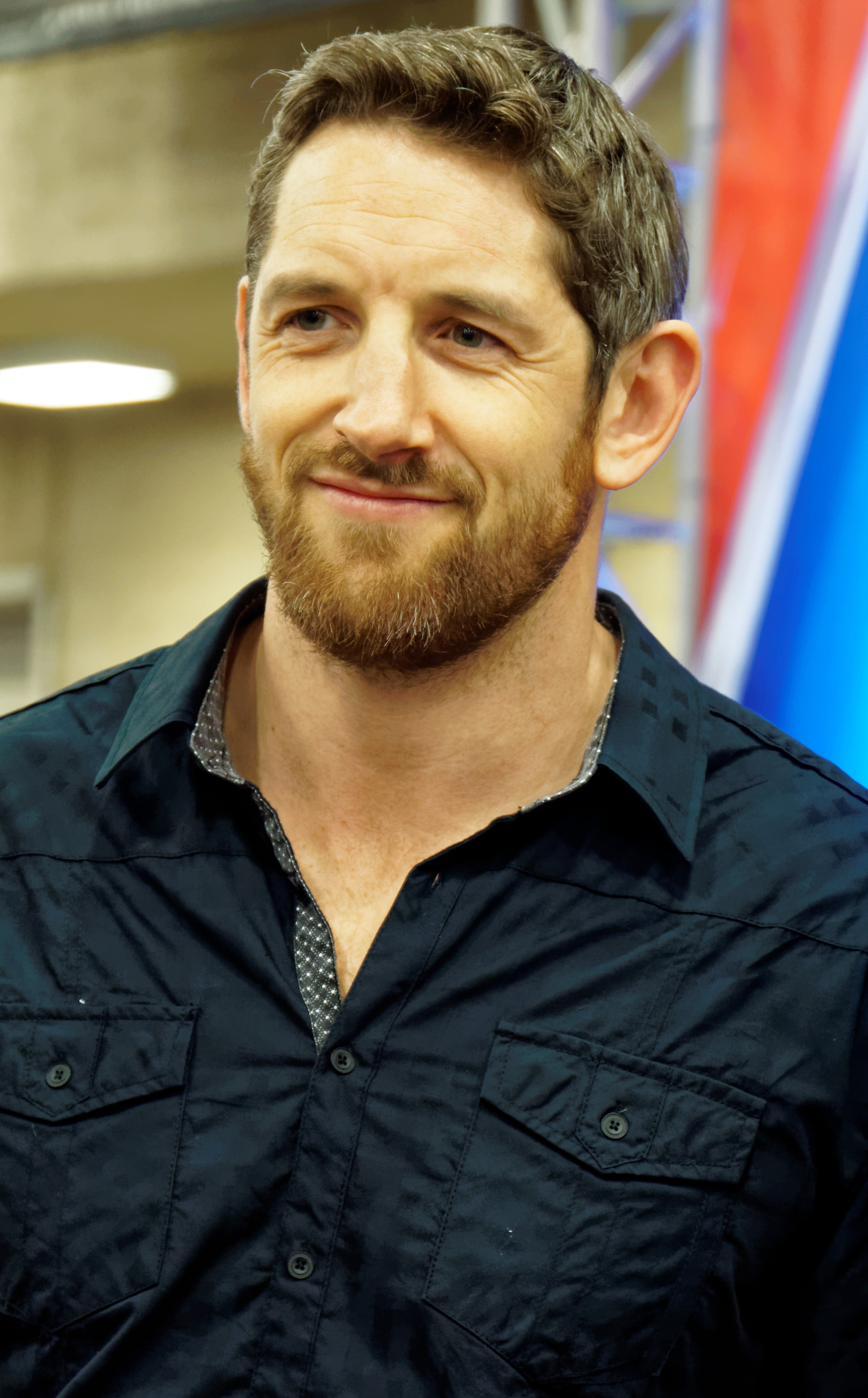
- Bennett in 2016

Personal information
- Born: Stuart Alexander Bennett; 10 August 1980 (age 46) Penwortham, Lancashire, England

Professional wrestling career
- Ring name(s): Bad News Barrett; King Barrett; Lawrence Knight; Pinnacle; Stu Bennett; Stu Sanders; Wade Barrett
- Billed height: 6 ft 7 in (201 cm)
- Billed weight: 246 lb (112 kg)
- Billed from: Manchester, England; Preston, England
- Trained by: Al Snow; Jon Richie
- Debut: 2004
- Retired: May 6, 2016

Stuart Alexander Bennett (born 10 August 1980) is an English and American retired professional wrestler, actor, and bare-knuckle boxer. He is signed to WWE, where he performs under the ring name Wade Barrett as a colour commentator on the SmackDown and Raw brands.

Barrett won the first season of NXT in 2010 and made his main roster debut on Raw later that year, rising to prominence as the leader of The Nexus, a villainous faction composed of the remaining NXT first season rookies. He headlined five PPV events for WWE in 2010—SummerSlam, Night of Champions, Bragging Rights, Survivor Series, and TLC—three of which saw him unsuccessfully challenge for the WWE Championship. In 2011, he formed The Corre, a short-lived group with former Nexus members Heath Slater and Justin Gabriel as well as Ezekiel Jackson. After they disbanded, he would go on to become a five-time Intercontinental Champion.

In 2013, Barrett's ring name was amended to Bad News Barrett and he adopted the character of someone who took immense pleasure in delivering bad news. Upon winning the 2015 King of the Ring tournament, his ring name was changed to King Barrett and he began portraying an arrogant royal character. He notably portrayed a villain for his entire WWE career, regardless of the other changes made to his character. He left WWE in 2016 and has not wrestled since, though he has appeared in non-wrestling roles on the international independent circuit, such as a commentator for World of Sport Wrestling and a general manager for Defiant Wrestling under his real name. He returned to WWE as a commentator for NXT in 2020.

Bennett made his acting debut in the action film Dead Man Down (2013) and has since starred in action films such as Eliminators (2016), I Am Vengeance (2018), and I Am Vengeance: Retaliation (2020).

== Early life ==
Stuart Alexander Bennett was born in Penwortham on 10 August 1980. His mother was a social worker, while his father was an accountant. He has an older brother who manages a supermarket. He grew up in nearby Preston, then moved to Wales with his family at the age of six. Despite spending much of his childhood in Wales and admitting that he does not remember anything about Preston, he does not consider Wales his home and has never lived in one place for more than nine years. He was inspired to become a professional wrestler by his idol Davey Boy Smith, and named the WWF Intercontinental Championship match in the main event of SummerSlam 1992 between Smith and his other childhood hero Bret Hart as his favourite match of all time. He earned a degree in marine biology from the University of Liverpool, after which he went to work in a science lab and as a recruitment consultant while training to become a wrestler.

While living in Liverpool in his early 20s, Bennett became a champion bare-knuckle boxer who would fight in various locations throughout Europe. He competed in a match in Budapest dubbed "The Battle of Buda" by the bare-knuckle underworld, in which he defeated a reputable opponent for a substantial cash prize. Later, while walking through an alleyway in search of a taxi to the airport, he was stabbed with an eight-inch knife by someone who attempted to steal the money; he has refused to discuss certain details for legal reasons, but admitted that he seriously injured his attacker and escaped with the money despite significant blood loss. The attack left him with a 12-inch scar that stretches from his upper back to halfway down his right arm, and the punches he took during his bare-knuckle career left him with a disfigured nose, but he has expressed no regret over that period of his life. He incorporated his bare-knuckle career into his WWE gimmick at the request of Dusty Rhodes, being introduced to the WWE audience as a bare-knuckle champion who had fought on the streets of Europe. His Wasteland move is named after the site of many of his fights.

== Professional wrestling career ==
=== Early career (2004–2006) ===
Bennett decided to become a professional wrestler at the age of 21, and was trained by Jon Ritchie and Al Snow. He made his professional wrestling debut in June 2004, using the ring name Stu Sanders, as a surprise entrant in a 30-man battle royal held by NWA UK Hammerlock Wrestling. Sanders also performed at numerous Dropkixx Wrestling, Real Quality Wrestling and All Star Wrestling events, as well as wrestling in Wales for Welsh Wrestling. In June 2005 he beat Danny Beckwith for the Dropkixx IWC Heavyweight Championship. In 2005, he feuded with Nick Aldis and Danny Dexter in Dropkixx Wrestling.

=== World Wrestling Entertainment / WWE (2006–2016) ===
==== Ohio Valley Wrestling (2006–2008) ====
After appearing as part of a security team on 13 November 2006 episode of Raw in Manchester, Barrett participated in a tryout with World Wrestling Entertainment (WWE) later that month. He had another tryout in 2007, and signed a developmental contract with them in October. He was assigned to Ohio Valley Wrestling (OVW) under his Stu Sanders ring name, where he defeated Ace Steel in a dark match. He later formed a tag team with Paul Burchill and the pair faced the Major Brothers in several matches. On 2 January 2008 Sanders and Burchill defeated Colt Cabana and Charles Evans in the final of a tournament for the OVW Southern Tag Team Championship. Sanders and Burchill held the title for nearly two months before losing it to Los Locos (Ramón and Raúl) in a four-way match also involving The Insurgency (Ali and Omar Akbar) and The Mobile Homers (Ted McNaler and Adam Revolver).

==== Florida Championship Wrestling (2008–2010) ====
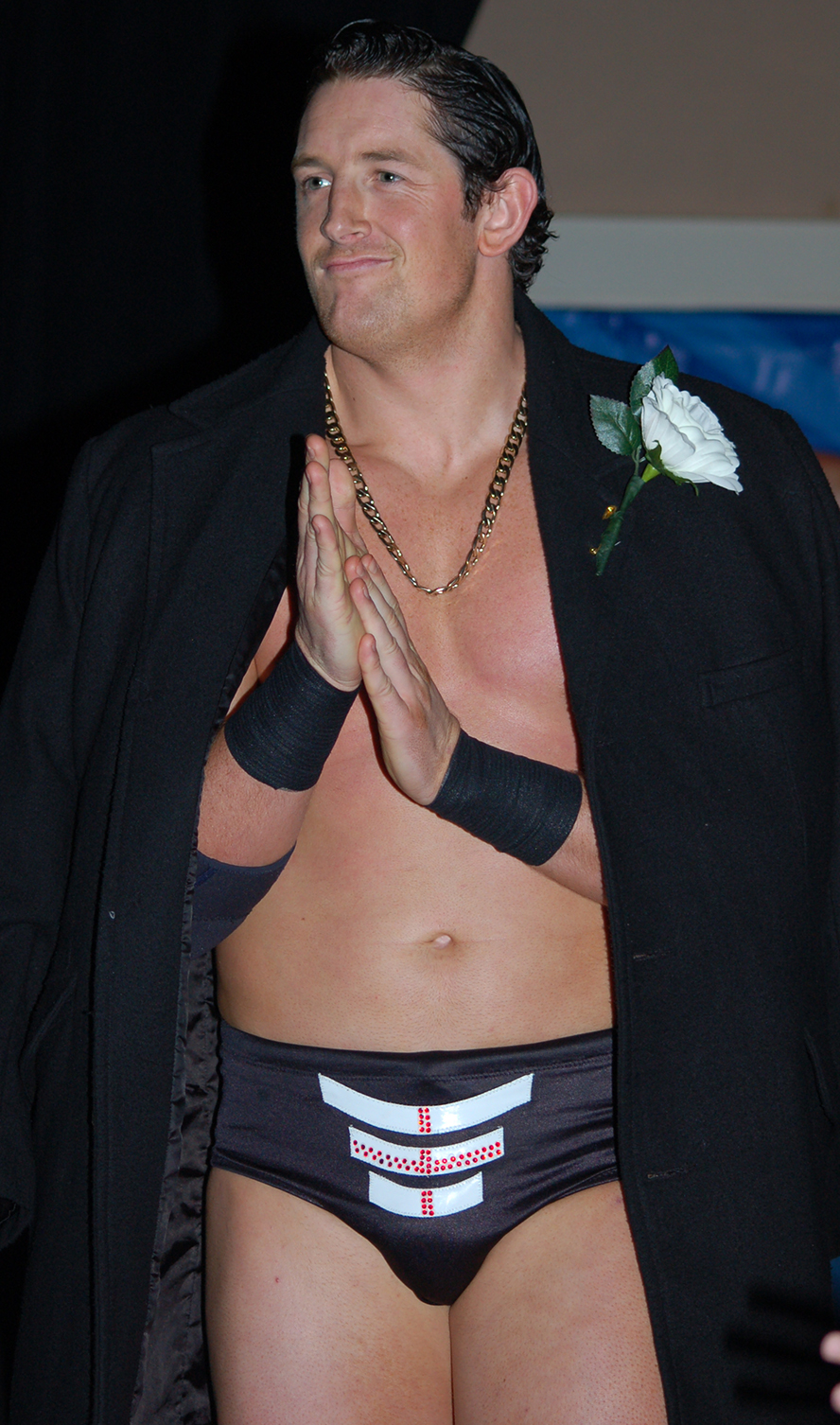
Barrett in Florida Championship Wrestling in January 2010

After WWE ended their relationship with OVW as a developmental territory, Sanders was moved to Florida Championship Wrestling (FCW) with several other wrestlers. On 6 May 2008, Sanders and Drew McIntyre, collectively known as The Empire, defeated The Puerto Rica Nightmares (Eddie Colón and Eric Pérez) to win the FCW Florida Tag Team Championship. They lost the titles back to the Nightmares at FCW's first TV taping on 17 July. The team broke up after the loss, and Sanders began wrestling under his real name before changing it to Lawrence Knight at 9 October FCW television taping. On 19 February 2009, Knight announced that he was the new FCW commentator, alongside Dusty Rhodes. He became colour commentator due to an injury, in which he tore his Latissimus dorsi muscle and required surgery. In August 2009, Bennett was renamed yet again to Wade Barrett, partially named for Wade Dooley. He described the character of Barrett as being an extension of his "dark side". He returned to in-ring competition in FCW in December 2009.

==== The Nexus and The Corre (2010–2011) ====
Barrett competed on the first season of NXT, with Chris Jericho as his storyline mentor. His first appearance for NXT was on the inaugural episode of NXT on 23 February, when he acted as Jericho's ring announcer. Barrett made his in-ring debut on the following episode of NXT, defeating Daniel Bryan. On 13 April episode of NXT, Barrett won the "talk the talk" challenge and was awarded his own custom made entrance theme. On 11 May, Barrett was ranked in first place in the Pros Poll. On 1 June 2010 episode of NXT, Barrett won the overall competition and a WWE contract, by defeating Gabriel and David Otunga in the season finale.

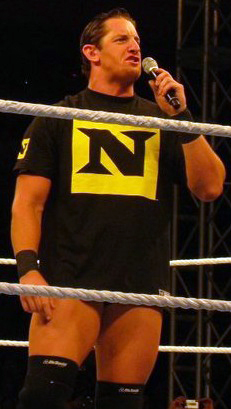
Barrett in September 2010

On 7 June 2010 edition of Raw, Barrett was at the forefront of an attack by the NXT rookies, as they interfered in the main event match between John Cena and CM Punk, attacking both competitors, Luke Gallows, the announce team, the timekeeper and the ring announcer, Justin Roberts, before they destroyed the ring area and surrounding equipment. Cena in particular was heavily targeted by the rookies, who hit him with their finishing moves. On 14 June 2010 edition of Raw, Barrett and the other rookies (minus Daniel Bryan) demanded full-time contracts from Raw General Manager Bret Hart, who instead fired Barrett and had the rookies removed from the building. Later in the show, the rookies attacked Hart and gave him until the Fatal 4-Way pay-per-view to decide on their contracts. At Fatal 4-Way, the rookies interfered in the main event for the WWE Championship, costing Cena the match and the championship in the process to Sheamus. The following night on Raw, Vince McMahon fired Hart and announced that a new 'anonymous' General Manager had been hired and the six rookies received WWE contracts (Barrett's contract was reinstated after he was originally fired the previous week). The group of rookies continued their path of disrupting main events, as they attacked both Cena and McMahon, who had been acting as the referee on 21 June 2010 edition of Raw. On 5 July 2010 edition of Raw, the group was named The Nexus. That same week, Barrett was absent from Raw as his work visa had expired and he had to return to the United Kingdom to apply for a new one. With his visa situation cleared up, Barrett returned the following week.

On 12 July 2010 edition of Raw, the Nexus (who were without Darren Young due to being injured in an attack by Cena the previous week) competed in their first match together and defeated Cena in a 6–on–1 handicap match after Gabriel hit Cena with the 450° splash. The following week, Barrett made his singles match debut on Raw by defeating Mark Henry. The Nexus continued to feud with Cena and the Raw roster, resulting in a seven-on-seven elimination tag team match at SummerSlam. Barrett was the final member of the Nexus but submitted to Cena, causing the Nexus to lose the match. After Young was exiled from the group for losing a match to Cena the night after SummerSlam and Skip Sheffield was injured at a live event in Hawaii two nights later, the Nexus faced Cena, Edge, Randy Orton, Sheamus and Jericho in a five-on-five elimination match on 30 August 2010 edition of Raw, which Barrett won by pinning Orton.

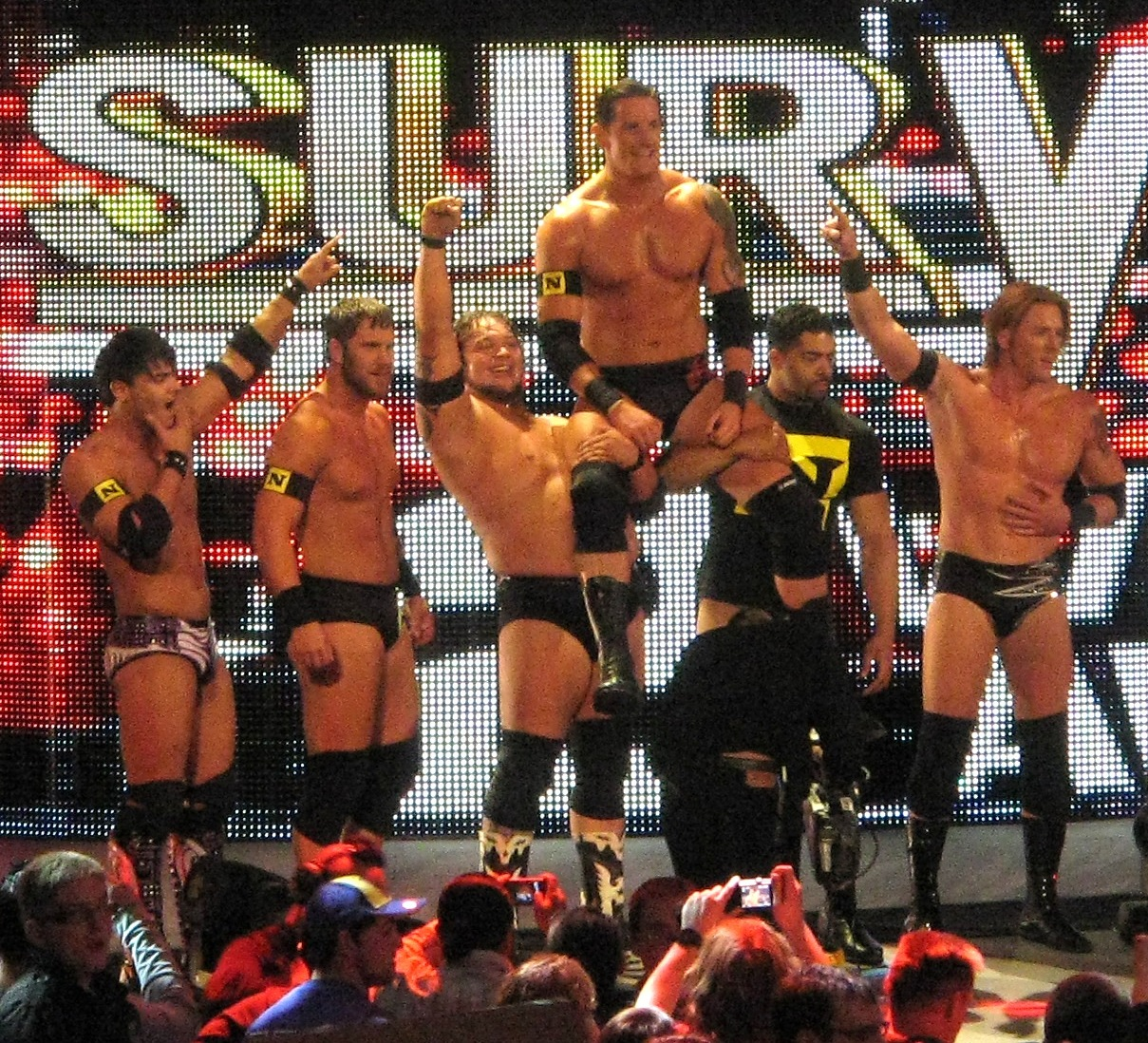
Barrett (raised) leading The Nexus in November 2010

Barrett received his guaranteed championship match from winning NXT at Night of Champions, where he was unsuccessful in a six-pack challenge match for the WWE Championship, despite eliminating Cena. The feud between Cena and the Nexus continued at Hell in a Cell on 3 October, when Barrett defeated Cena (after interference from Husky Harris and Michael McGillicutty) to force Cena to become a member of the Nexus. The following night on Raw, Barrett, with the help of the rest of the Nexus, won a battle royal to determine the number one contender to the WWE Championship, when Cena eliminated himself on Barrett's orders. Barrett received his championship match against Randy Orton at the Bragging Rights pay-per-view. After ordering Cena to help him win, Cena interfered in the match causing Barrett to win via disqualification, which meant that Orton retained the championship. The following night, Barrett was granted a rematch at the Survivor Series pay-per-view, and allowed to choose a guest referee. He chose Cena, stating that if Barrett won the match and the WWE Championship, Cena would be allowed to leave the Nexus; however if Barrett failed to win the title, Cena would be fired. At Survivor Series, Barrett was unsuccessful in winning the WWE Championship from Orton after Cena pushed him into an RKO by Orton. Cena was fired as per the match stipulation after Survivor Series. Due to Cena's interference, Barrett received a rematch for the championship the following night on Raw, but was attacked by the fired Cena, "costing" him the match, leading to The Miz to cash in his Money in the Bank briefcase on Orton. After Cena attacked several members of the Nexus over the next few weeks, they demanded that Barrett re-instate him, or be exiled from the group. On 13 December 2010 edition of Raw, Barrett agreed and rehired Cena on the condition Cena faces Barrett in a Chairs match at the TLC: Tables, Ladders and Chairs pay-per-view, which Cena won.

Barrett made his first appearance since the TLC pay-per-view on 3 January 2011 edition of Raw, where he confronted CM Punk, who had taken over the leadership of the Nexus in his absence. Punk gave Barrett the opportunity to regain the leadership, stating that if he won a triple threat steel cage match involving Orton and Sheamus to determine the number one contender for The Miz's WWE Championship, Punk would not only give up the leadership, but work for Barrett's Nexus. However, during the match, Punk came down to ringside, attacked Barrett as he was about to win and took off Barrett's Nexus armband, symbolically removing him from the Nexus, resulting in Barrett losing the match. At the television tapings of 10 January 2011 edition of SmackDown the next day, Barrett made his first SmackDown appearance since 1 October, this time by attacking Big Show. The following week, he was joined by Ezekiel Jackson and his former Nexus stablemates Gabriel and Slater, who had left the group the previous Monday. They named themselves The Corre. Barrett later qualified for the Elimination Chamber match for the World Heavyweight Championship, but came up short after being the first man eliminated by Big Show.

At the television tapings of 25 March 2011 edition of SmackDown, Barrett defeated Kofi Kingston to win the Intercontinental Championship. At WrestleMania XXVII, The Corre were defeated in an eight-man tag team match by the team of Kingston, Big Show, Kane and Santino Marella. Barrett went on to successfully defend his championship against Kingston on 22 April 2011 edition of SmackDown. On 6 May 2011 edition of SmackDown, Barrett, Gabriel, and Slater attacked Jackson, removing him from the group. On 13 May 2011 edition of SmackDown, Barrett then challenged Jackson to a match for the Intercontinental Championship at the Over the Limit pay-per-view and Jackson accepted. At the event, Gabriel and Slater attacked Jackson during the match, resulting in a disqualification, but Barrett retained the title as a title cannot change hands via disqualification. He then defended his Intercontinental title against Jackson again on 3 June 2011 edition of SmackDown. During this match, Jackson threw Barrett out of the ring, resulting in a countout, but once again, Barrett retained the title as a title cannot change hands via countout. Barrett then instructed The Corre to attack Jackson, but abandoned Gabriel and Slater, whom Jackson fended off. The following week, The Corre dissolved after Barrett, fleeing from Jackson, walked out on Gabriel and Slater in a six-man tag team match against Jackson and The Usos, causing them to lose the match. At Capitol Punishment, Barrett lost the Intercontinental Championship to Jackson, and failed to win his rematch for the title on 24 June episode of SmackDown. On 1 July episode of SmackDown, Barrett was announced to be one of the participants for the SmackDown Money in the Bank match at the Money in the Bank pay-per-view, facing Heath Slater, Justin Gabriel, Kane, Sin Cara, Daniel Bryan, Cody Rhodes and Sheamus. The match was won by Daniel Bryan, sparking a rivalry between the two. At SummerSlam, Barrett defeated Bryan in a singles match. He then had a short feud with Sheamus, where he lost on three occasions.

==== Barrett Barrage (2011–2012) ====
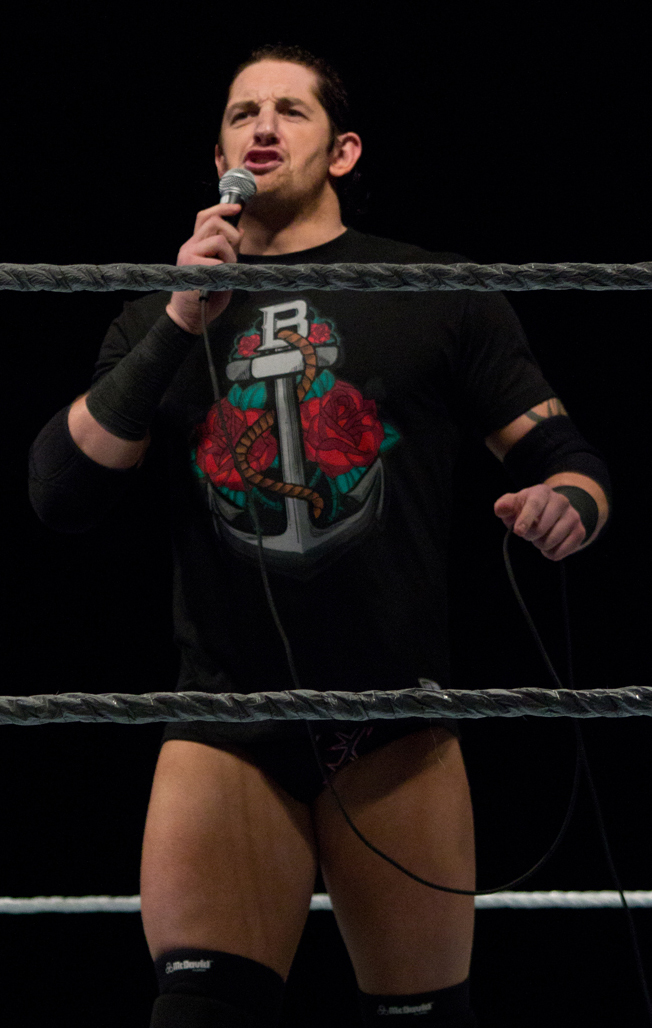
Barrett addressing the audience in January 2012

On the 21 October episode of SmackDown, Barrett dismissed his past allies as a "legion of parasites" and claimed that the only person he needed for success was himself. He vowed that the "Barrett Barrage" was only just beginning. Barrett followed this announcement by beating Daniel Bryan. The next week, he began a winning streak, defeating John Morrison, Trent Barreta, Sheamus, and Randy Orton in singles competition. In November, he began feuding with Orton, and both were announced as opposing team captains for Survivor Series. Barrett's winning streak was broken on the 14 November episode of Raw, when he was defeated by Orton via disqualification after Team Barrett attacked Orton. Team Barrett defeated Team Orton at Survivor Series, with Barrett and Cody Rhodes being the sole survivors of the match. On the 25 November episode of SmackDown, Barrett competed in a fatal four-way match against Orton, Cody Rhodes, and Daniel Bryan to determine the number one contender for the World Heavyweight Championship, which Bryan won.

Barrett continued his feud with Orton by attacking and distracting him during matches. On the 9 December episode of SmackDown, Barrett and Orton were put into two Beat the Clock matches, with the winner choosing the stipulation for their match at TLC: Tables, Ladders and Chairs. Barrett defeated Ezekiel Jackson in 7:53, but Orton beat Dolph Ziggler in 7:51 and chose a Table match. At TLC, Orton defeated Barrett after hitting the RKO in mid-air, with Barrett landing through the table. On the 23 December episode of SmackDown, they brawled backstage, ending when Orton hit Barrett with the RKO onto a car. This led to a Falls Count Anywhere match the next week, where Barrett pushed Orton down a set of stairs before exiting through the door. Orton suffered a herniated disc as a result, taking him off television for a number of weeks. After Orton returned from injury in late January 2012, he eliminated Barrett from the 2012 Royal Rumble match. On the 3 February edition of SmackDown, Orton defeated Barrett in a No Disqualifications match to end the feud.

At Elimination Chamber, Barrett failed to capture the World Heavyweight Championship after being eliminated by Santino Marella. The following night on Raw, Barrett suffered a partially dislocated elbow after Big Show threw Dolph Ziggler at him during a battle royal, and was taken off television.

==== Intercontinental Champion (2012–2013) ====
In August 2012, WWE aired vignettes promoting Barrett's return, showing him fighting at an underground fight club in an attempt to "reignite the flame". Now sporting a beard and shorter hair, he made his return on the 7 September episode of SmackDown to defeat Yoshi Tatsu. He then went on a winning streak, defeating wrestlers including Justin Gabriel, Tyson Kidd, and Zack Ryder, among others. His first loss came on 8 October episode of Raw, when he lost a non-title match to World Heavyweight Champion Sheamus via disqualification after Big Show interfered. Barrett suffered his first pinfall loss on 19 October episode of SmackDown, in a Lumberjack match against Sheamus. At Survivor Series, Barrett was part of the winning team of Dolph Ziggler against the team of Mick Foley, where he eliminated Intercontinental Champion Kofi Kingston before being eliminated by The Miz.

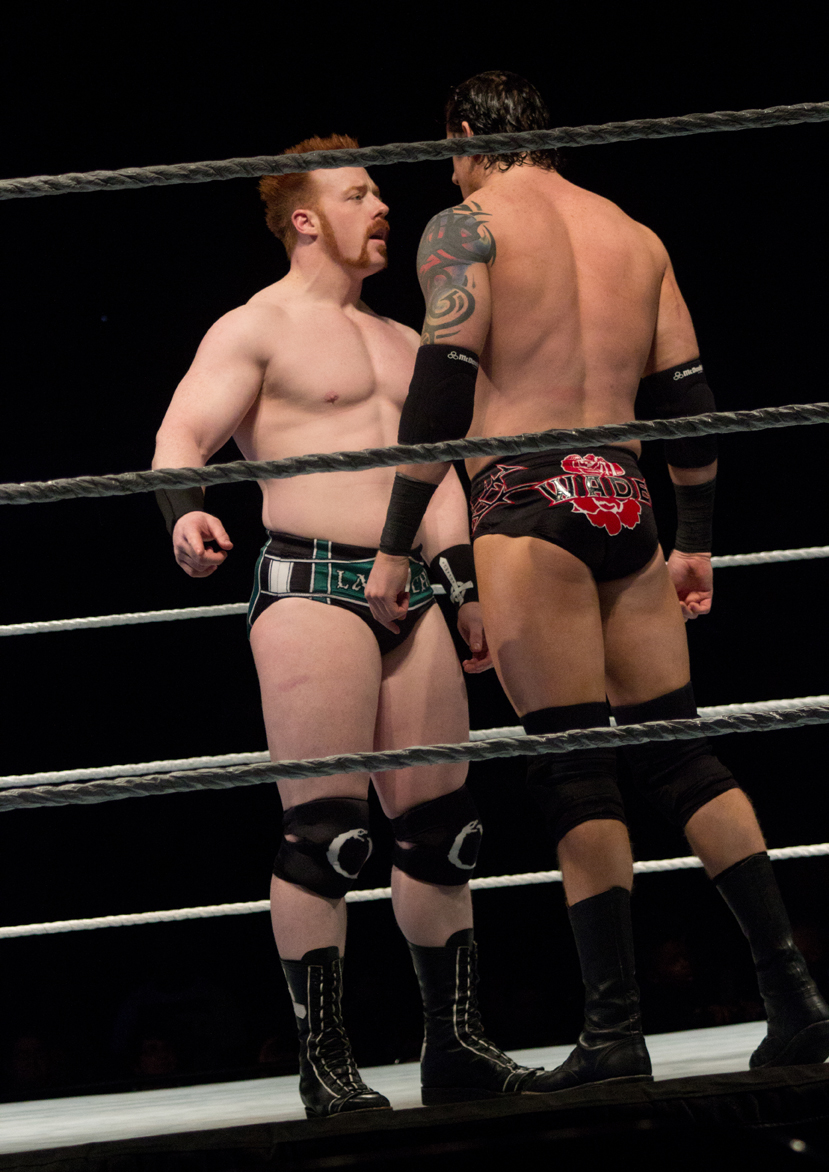
Barrett (right) and Sheamus face to face

The following night on Raw, Barrett defeated Kingston in a non-title match to earn a match for the Intercontinental Championship. Barrett, still number one contender for the Intercontinental Championship, received a shot at the United States Championship on 3 December Raw, against champion Antonio Cesaro, Kofi Kingston, and R-Truth in a fatal four-way match, but was unsuccessful. Barrett failed to win the Intercontinental Championship from Kingston at the TLC pay-per-view. Two weeks later, on 31 December Raw, Barrett defeated Kingston to win the Intercontinental Championship for the second time in his career. Barrett made his first successful title defence four days later on SmackDown, defeating Kingston in a rematch. Barrett entered the 2013 Royal Rumble match and was eliminated by the debuting Bo Dallas, but Barrett later returned to eliminate Dallas as well. This started a feud between the duo, with Barrett challenging Dallas to a non-title match the next night on Raw, and Dallas pulling off an upset victory. During the month of February, Barrett and Dallas continued to feud with the two attacking each other backstage. On 21 March taping of NXT, Wade Barrett defeated Bo Dallas for another successful title defence.

During the WrestleMania 29 pre-show, Barrett lost the Intercontinental Championship to The Miz, however, he would regain the title in a rematch the following night on Raw. On 20 May Raw, Barrett and Fandango were defeated by Chris Jericho and The Miz in a tag team match after Fandango left the match to dance at ringside and Miz submitted Barrett with the figure-four leglock. Barrett then lost an Intercontinental Championship match to The Miz by disqualification, after Fandango interfered, leading to Barrett attacking both Miz and Fandango post-match. On the next episode of Raw, Barrett was defeated by Fandango in a non-title match after The Miz, who was special guest referee, gave Barrett a Skull Crushing Finale. In June, Fandango suffered a legitimate concussion, removing him from the feud between Barrett and Miz.

At Payback, Barrett lost the Intercontinental Championship to Curtis Axel in a triple threat match, also involving The Miz. Barrett received his rematch for the title on the following episode of SmackDown, but was again defeated by Axel. On 14 July at the Money in the Bank pay-per-view, Barrett competed in the World Heavyweight Championship Money in the Bank ladder match, but was unsuccessful as the match was ultimately won by Damien Sandow. Barrett finally ended his long losing streak on 31 July Main Event, when he defeated R-Truth. On 5 August Raw, Barrett was to shave Daniel Bryan's beard at the orders of Vince McMahon as part of Bryan's "corporate makeover", but Bryan attacked and shaved Barrett instead. That same week on SmackDown, Barrett lost to Bryan, but on the next Raw, Barrett defeated Bryan after special guest referee Brad Maddox made a fast count on Bryan. Four days later on SmackDown, Barrett was again defeated by Bryan in a no disqualification match.

==== Bad News Barrett (2013–2015) ====
After an absence from WWE television due to legitimate work visa issues, he returned on 2 December 2013 episode of Raw as Bad News Barrett, a persona he had previously assumed on The JBL and Cole Show, but was still called Wade on occasion by commentators and backstage interviewers.

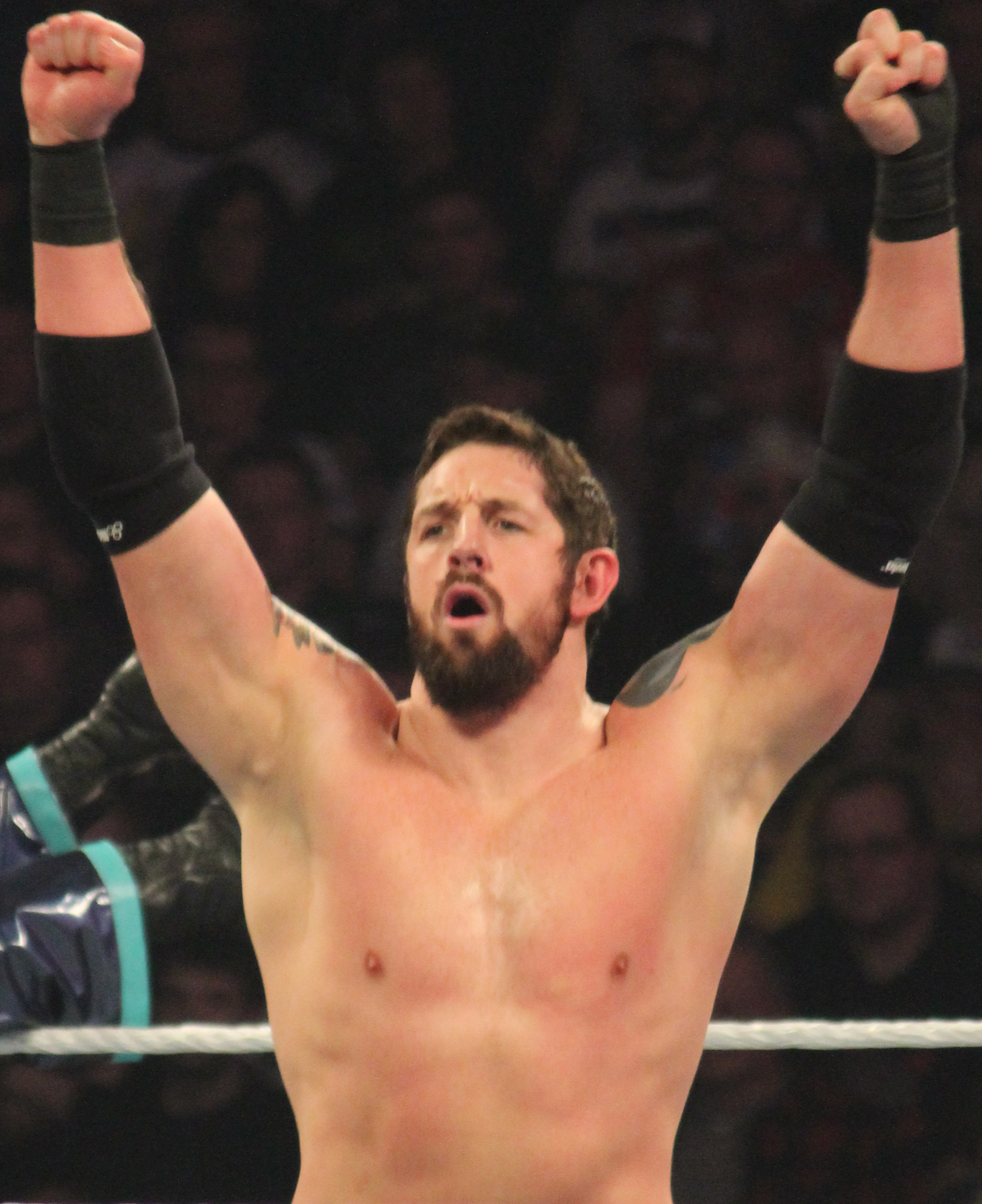
BNB after a match in April 2014

Barrett made his in-ring return on 7 April 2014 Raw, defeating Rey Mysterio in Mysterio's last WWE appearance until 2018. On 14 April episode of Raw, Barrett defeated Dolph Ziggler in round one of the #1 Contender's Tournament for an Intercontinental Championship match at Extreme Rules and on 21 April Raw, Barrett defeated Sheamus to advance to the finals of the tournament. He defeated Rob Van Dam on 28 April Raw in the final round of the tournament, earning a match at Extreme Rules for the Intercontinental Championship against Big E. At Extreme Rules, he became the Intercontinental Champion for the fourth time in his career when he defeated Big E. He then defeated Van Dam at Payback to retain his Intercontinental Championship. On 9 June Raw, he competed in a WWE World Heavyweight Championship qualifying match for the Money in the Bank pay-per-view, but failed after a Brogue Kick by Sheamus. However, Triple H put him in the Money in the Bank ladder match for a WWE World Heavyweight Championship contract on 23 June Raw. The following night at the SmackDown tapings, Barrett separated his shoulder after he was thrown into the barricade by Jack Swagger, so he was pulled from the pay-per-view. Barrett's injury required surgery, ruling him out for months, thus WWE made the move to vacate the Intercontinental Championship on 30 June.

"... I was kinda told by the powers that be that I had to knock it on the head for a while as too many people were joining in and cheering me for it so maybe we will bring it back after Wrestlemania but for now I have to be a bit quieter".

— In a March 2015 interview, Barrett explained why his character stopped delivering 'bad news'

Barrett returned onscreen in November at the pre-show of Survivor Series. On 29 December 2014 episode of Raw, Barrett returned to action and defeated Cesaro. On 5 January 2015 episode of Raw, Barrett defeated Dolph Ziggler in a 2-out-of-3 falls match to capture his fifth Intercontinental Championship. At Fastlane, Barrett retained his title against Dean Ambrose after Ambrose got himself disqualified. Ambrose then stole the Intercontinental title, but he would not be the only one to do so for the following weeks, as various wrestlers gained possession of Barrett's title belt, including R-Truth, Luke Harper, Dolph Ziggler, Daniel Bryan, and Stardust. Of these people, Barrett was pinned in non-title matches against R-Truth, Ziggler, Bryan, and Ambrose within a month before and after Fastlane. Thus, a ladder match for the Intercontinental Title was made for WrestleMania 31, with Barrett defending against Ambrose, Harper, R-Truth, Ziggler, Stardust, and Bryan, who ultimately won the match. Barrett was scheduled to face Bryan for the championship in a rematch at Extreme Rules, however Bryan was not medically cleared to compete. Barrett instead faced Neville in a losing effort on the pre-show.

==== King Barrett (2015–2016) ====
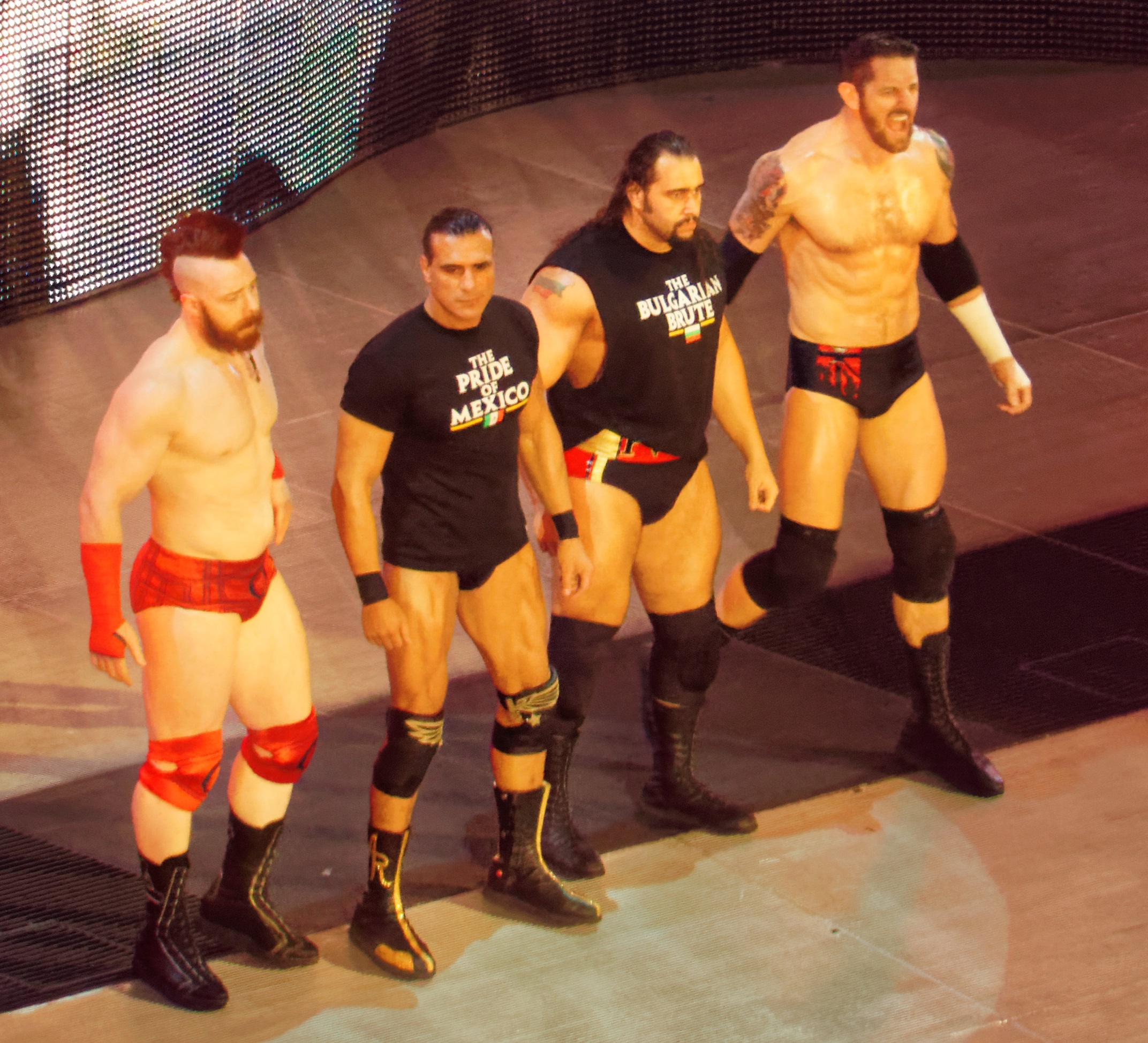
The League of Nations in April 2016

On 28 April 2015 episode of Raw, Barrett would compete in the 2015 King of the Ring tournament, where he defeated Dolph Ziggler in the first round. The following night on the WWE Network, Barrett would defeat R-Truth in the semi-finals before defeating fellow Englishman Neville in the final to become the twentieth winner of the tournament. Under the moniker King Barrett, he would go on to deliberately get himself counted-out to Neville at Payback. King Barrett participated in the Elimination Chamber match for the vacant Intercontinental Championship, but was the first eliminated by R-Truth. At the Money in the Bank pre-show, Barrett lost to Truth. After his victory, Truth began referring to himself as "King What's Up" and wore a cape and crown to mock Barrett. The feud culminated in a match at Battleground, which saw Barrett defeat Truth.

Barrett then formed a partnership named "The Lords of Darkness" with Stardust, leading to a tag team match at SummerSlam, where they were defeated by Neville and actor Stephen Amell, when Neville pinned Barrett for the win. The night after SummerSlam, Stardust turned on Barrett for costing him the match, thus disbanding their tag team. After a short hiatus, Barrett returned on 28 September episode of Raw, attacking Neville and Stardust.

On 5 October episode of Raw, Barrett helped Sheamus defeat Neville, after Barrett, who was on commentary during the match, distracted Neville long enough for Sheamus to take advantage. Barrett and Sheamus would then form a tag team, defeating Neville and Cesaro in tag team matches on both Raw and SmackDown. At Survivor Series, Barrett took part in a 5-on-5 traditional Survivor Series elimination tag team match, alongside Sheamus and The New Day, with this team being defeated by Ryback, The Usos and The Lucha Dragons. The following night on Raw, Barrett would help Rusev and Sheamus against Roman Reigns. On 9 November in Manchester, footballer Wayne Rooney slapped Barrett after Barrett talked trash to him repeatedly.

On 30 November episode of Raw, after interfering in Sheamus' WWE World Heavyweight Championship title defence against Reigns, Sheamus announced the formation of The League of Nations stable alongside Barrett, Rusev and Alberto Del Rio. On 14 January episode of Smackdown, Barrett helped Del Rio to win United States Championship.

On 7 March 2016 episode of Raw, Barrett, along with Sheamus and Rusev, competed against Dolph Ziggler in a 3-on-1 handicap elimination match, where Barrett was the only member of his team to be eliminated. At Roadblock, Barrett and Sheamus unsuccessfully challenged The New Day for the WWE Tag Team Championship. On 14 March edition of Raw, Barrett and the entire League of Nations attacked the New Day, after Alberto Del Rio lost to Big E and Xavier Woods in a Tag Team title match. After the attack, Sheamus issued a challenge to The New Day for a six-man tag team match at WrestleMania 32. On 17 March episode of Smackdown, Barrett suffered a loss against Kofi Kingston. At WrestleMania, Barrett's stablemates defeated The New Day after interference from Barrett himself. On 4 April episode of Raw, Barrett and Sheamus challenged the New Day for the tag titles, but lost. After the match, the League of Nations blamed Barrett for being the "weak link" and attacked him, ejecting him from the group. This was his last appearance for WWE.

On 6 May, WWE announced that Bennett had been released. Following his release, Bennett stated that he chose not to sign a new contract with WWE in August 2015, his contract was scheduled to end in June 2016, but WWE had agreed to an early release from his contract. He asked for his release because he was burnt out creatively and was sick of the crazy schedule of the WWE. Bennett then took a hiatus from wrestling altogether in order to focus on his acting career, but said he would return to wrestling when he felt the time was right.

=== Independent circuit (2017–2020) ===
After leaving WWE, Bennett would work in non-wrestling roles. He spent 2017 making appearances in WhatCulture Pro Wrestling (WCPW), which later became Defiant Wrestling, where he served as on-screen general manager. The following year, he joined World of Sport Wrestling (WOS) as an on-screen executive and commentator.

Bennett appeared on Lucha Underground for its season four finale on 8 November 2018, marking his first and only appearance as Lucha Underground closed soon after. In December 2019, he provided colour commentary for the National Wrestling Alliance (NWA) during their Into the Fire PPV as well as NWA Power tapings.

=== Return to WWE (2020–present) ===
On 26 August 2020 episode of NXT, which had become WWE's third major brand while he was gone, Bennett returned to WWE under his earlier Wade Barrett name to serve as a colour commentator in a single-appearance deal. He would become an official member of the NXT commentary team the following week. On 17 September, he announced in an interview with Sports Illustrated that he had signed a one-year deal with WWE to become a permanent member of the NXT broadcast team. On 6 October 2022, WWE announced that they had shuffled their commentary and interview teams, with Barrett moving to SmackDown to be the colour commentator alongside Michael Cole. On 5 August 2023, WWE made more changes to their commentary teams and moved Barrett to Raw. On the 29 January 2024 episode of Raw, Barrett would be replaced on the commentary team by Pat McAfee, with Barrett moving back to the SmackDown commentary team alongside Corey Graves. He moved back to Raw on 2 September alongside the debuting Joe Tessitore. He moved back to SmackDown on 10 January, alongside Tessitore. Barrett called his first WrestleMania at WrestleMania 41 alongside Michael Cole and Pat McAfee. On January 5, 2026, he and Tessitore moved back to SmackDown.

== Acting career ==
Under the Wade Barrett name, Bennett had a small role as Kilroy in the crime thriller film Dead Man Down (2013), for which he adopted a New York accent. He also starred as assassin George "Bishop" Edwards in the action thriller film Eliminators (2016). Credited under his real name, he starred as John Gold in the action films I Am Vengeance (2018) and I Am Vengeance: Retaliation (2020), both of which received primarily negative reviews; however, Bennett received praise for his performance, with Variety noting that Retaliation showed "sufficient comic chops to occasionally undercut Gold's macho with self-parody".

== Personal life ==
Bennett was granted an American green card in 2014, and became an American citizen in 2021. He supports his hometown football team Preston North End FC. In his spare time, he plays the guitar.

Bennett was in a relationship with American wrestler Victoria Crawford, better known as Alicia Fox, in the mid-2010s, and they remained friends after breaking up.

== Filmography ==
=== Film ===
Year	Title	Role
2013	Dead Man Down	Kilroy
2016	Eliminators	George "Bishop" Edwards
2017	Fanged Up	Viktor
2018	I Am Vengeance	John Gold
2020	I Am Vengeance: Retaliation	John Gold

=== Television ===
Year	Title	Role	Notes
2015	Total Divas	Himself	Guest star
2018	Ultimate Beastmaster		

=== Web ===
Year	Title	Role	Notes
2013–15	The JBL and Cole Show	Himself	
2015	Swerved	Himself	1 episode

== Championships and accomplishments ==
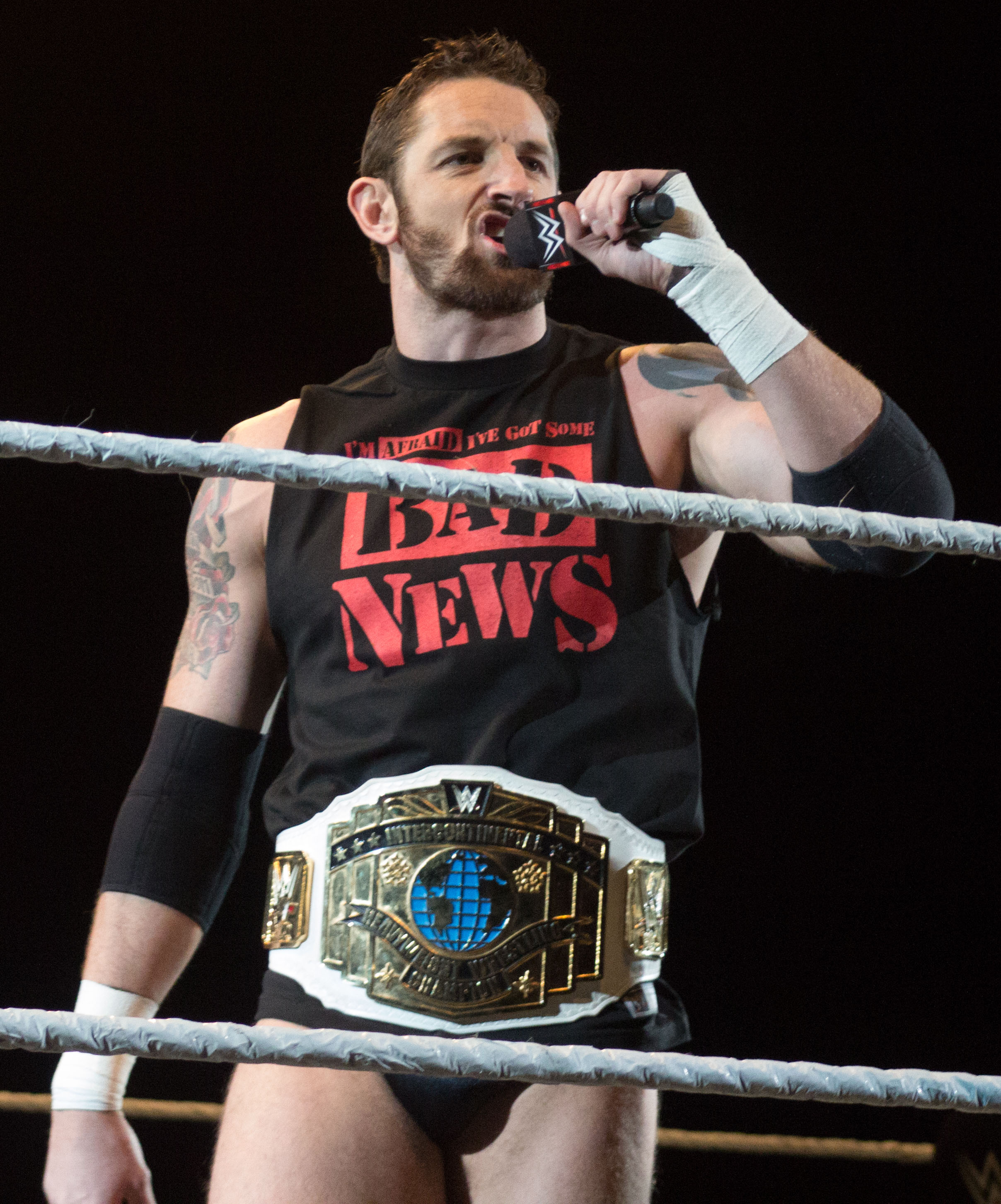
Barrett is a five-time Intercontinental Champion

- The Baltimore Sun
  - Feud of the Year (2010) - The Nexus vs John Cena
  - Newcomer of the Year (2010)
- Dropkixx
  - IWC European Heavyweight Championship (1 time, inaugural)
  - Dropkixx IWC European Heavyweight Title Tournament (2005)
  - Best Physical Appearance Award (2005)
- Florida Championship Wrestling
  - FCW Florida Tag Team Championship (2 time) – with Drew McIntyre
- Ohio Valley Wrestling
  - OVW Southern Tag Team Championship (1 time) – with Paul Burchill
- Pro Wrestling Illustrated
  - Feud of the Year (2010) – The Nexus vs. WWE
  - Most Hated Wrestler of the Year (2010) – As part of The Nexus
  - Ranked No. 19 of the top 500 singles wrestlers in the PWI 500 in 2011
- WWE/World Wrestling Entertainment
  - WWE Intercontinental Championship (5 times)
  - King of the Ring (2015)
  - NXT (Season one)
  - WWE Intercontinental Championship No. 1 Contender's Tournament (2014)
  - Slammy Award (1 time)
    - Shocker of the Year (2010) – The debut of The Nexus

== Awards and nominations ==
Year	Award	Category	Work	Result
2018	Urban Action Showcase	Best Actor	I Am Vengeance	Won
2020	British Film Festival	Best Stunt Performing Actors (Shared with Vinnie Jones)	I Am Vengeance: Retaliation	Won
