= Wych Kaosayananda =

Thai filmmaker (born 1974)

- วิชช์ เกาไศยนันท์
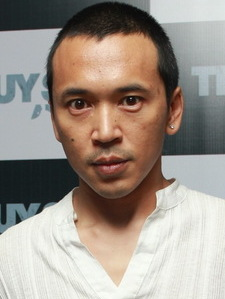
- Kaosayananda in 2012
- Born: 1974 (age 51–52); Thailand
- Other names: Kaos; Wych Kaos
- Occupations: Director; producer; writer; cinematographer
- Years active: 1998–present
- Known for: Fah (Thai film); Ballistic: Ecks vs. Sever

Wych Kaosayananda (Thai: วิชช์ เกาไศยนันท์; born 1974), also known as Wych Kaos or Kaos, is a Thai film director.

== Career ==
His directorial debut was Fah, released in 1998, which at the time was the highest-budgeted film in the history of the Thai film industry, but failed in the Thai box office.

His second film and American debut (which he directed under the shortened name "Kaos") was the 2002 thriller Ballistic: Ecks vs. Sever, which upon release was widely panned by both critics and moviegoers as one of the worst films ever made. In March 2007, Rotten Tomatoes ranked the film number 1 among "The Worst of the Worst" movie list.

Kaosayananda's post-Ballistic films include Tekken 2: Kazuya's Revenge (2014), Zero Tolerance (2015) and One Night in Bangkok (2020).

Zero Tolerance was previously completed and released only in Vietnam under the title of Angels. Kaosayananda found it difficult to sell his film to distributors because Angels was more of a drama than an action film. Therefore, he decided to add action star Scott Adkins into the mix for marquee value and to re-shoot and re-edit the entire film in order to craft more of a streamlined actioner that would interest buyers. This re-edited version, entitled Zero Tolerance, is the cut of the film that has been released to the rest of the world.

Dead Earth tells a parallel story to Kaosayananda's The Driver, focusing on events that happen within the same post-apocalyptic world, with characters and locations intersecting between both films.

== Filmography ==
Year	Title	Director	Producer	Writer	DoP
1998	Fah	Yes	No	Yes	No
2002	Ballistic: Ecks vs. Sever	Yes	Yes	No	No
2012	Angels	Yes	Yes	Yes	No
2013	The Lost Medallion: The Adventures of Billy Stone	No	Yes	No	No
2014	Tekken 2: Kazuya's Revenge	Yes	No	No	Yes
2015	Zero Tolerance	Yes	No	Yes	Yes
2019	The Driver	Yes	Yes	Yes	Yes
2020	Two of Us	Yes	Yes	Yes	No
2020	One Night in Bangkok	Yes	Yes	Yes	Yes
2023	Sheroes	No	No	No	Yes
2025	Bang	Yes	Yes	No	Yes
TBA	Maxx †	Yes	Yes	Yes	No
TBA	Bangkok Love Story †	Yes	No	Yes	No

Cinematographer only

- The Mark (2012)
- The Mark: Redemption (2013)
- Once Upon a Time in Vietnam (2013)
- Invincible (2020)
- The Gunrunner (TBA)
