= Misfire (film) =

2014 film by R. Ellis Frazier

- Theatrical poster
- Directed by: R. Ellis Frazier
- Story by: Benjamin Budd; R. Ellis Frazier
- Produced by: R. Ellis Frazier; Marty Murray
- Starring: Gary Daniels; Vannessa Vasquez; Michael Greco
- Cinematography: Anthony J. Rickert-Epstein; Jorge Roman
- Music by: Larry Groupé
- Production companies: Badhouse Studios Mexico; Full Throttle Pictures
- Distributed by: Hannibal Pictures; Image Entertainment
- Release date: October 6, 2014 (DVD)
- Running time: 88 min
- Country: United States
- Language: English
- Budget: $1,000,000

Misfire is a 2014 American action film produced and directed by R. Ellis Frazier. The film stars Gary Daniels and Vannessa Vasquez in lead roles. The film was released on DVD in October 2014.

== Plot ==
The film centers around a seasoned Drug Enforcement Administration agent Cole (Daniels), who descends into the underworld of Tijuana drug mafia in search of his journalist ex-wife who he believes has been abducted by a charismatic drug cartel boss with aspirations for public office.

== Cast ==
- Gary Daniels as Cole
- Vannessa Vasquez as Gracie
- Michael Greco as Johnny
- Luis Gratia as Raul Montenegro
- Geoffrey Ross as Fitz
- Alma Cruz as Sarah

== Reception ==
Eoin Friel from the Action Elite website gave the film 3.5 stars out of 5, writing that "overall, despite a slow start, Misfire is an engaging action thriller with a first rate performance from Gary Daniels and there is enough action to please genre fans". Friel particularly praised Vasquez's role as Gracie, noting that she "is jaw-droppingly gorgeous and incredibly likeable ...; she managed to be tough and sympathetic which isn’t easy to pull off".

James Simpson from Infernal Cinema wrote: "Entertaining and exciting in places due to its action scenes, Misfire is a short and sweet affair". Simpson noted that "Misfire appears to be part of a new wave of action and thriller movies that have cropped up since The Bourne Identity".
