= WildBrain =

Canadian media company

WildBrain Ltd.
- Logo used since 2019
- Formerly: DHX Media Ltd. (2006–2019)
- Type: Public
- Traded as: TSX: WILD
- Industry: Television production
- Predecessors: Wildbrain Entertainment; Decode Entertainment; Halifax Film Company; Cookie Jar Group; Ragdoll Worldwide
- Founded: 2006; 20 years ago
- Founders: Michael Donovan; Steven DeNure
- Headquarters: Toronto, Ontario, Canada
- Number of locations: 10
- Key people: Josh Scherba (president and CEO)
- Revenue: ▲CA$439.8 million (FY 2019)
- Number of employees: est. 1000 (2015)
- Divisions: WildBrain Studios; WildBrain Distribution
- Subsidiaries: WildBrain London; WildBrain CPLG; House of Cool; Personality AI
- Website: wildbrain.com

WildBrain Ltd. is a Canadian media, animation studio, production, and brand licensing company, mostly associated as an entertainment company. The company is known for owning the largest independent library of children's television programming, including the assets of acquisitions such as Cookie Jar Group, Epitome Pictures, and Wildbrain Entertainment among others, distribution rights to the Jay Ward Productions and Ragdoll Productions libraries. (Note: Ragdoll shows produced from 1990 to 2017 are owned by the company due to them buying out Ragdoll Worldwide in 2013.)

The company was founded in 2006 as DHX Media, via a merger between Decode Entertainment and the Halifax Film Company. The company subsequently acquired other studios and assets, acquired the Canadian specialty service Family Channel in 2014 to expand into broadcasting, and established the YouTube multi-channel network WildBrain (now WildBrain London) in 2016. Building upon the strength of the division, the entirety of the company was rebranded as WildBrain in 2019.

== History ==
The evolution of WildBrain
Year	Event
1968	FilmFair London is founded
1971	DIC Audiovisuel is founded
1972	Strawberry Shortcake brand is first developed
1974	CPLG is founded
1976	CINAR and Colossal Pictures are founded
1982	DIC Enterprises is founded
1984–1985	Ragdoll Productions is founded
1986–1987	Andy Heyward takes over DIC Enterprises and renames it DIC Animation City with help from both Bear Stearns & Co and Prudential Insurance Co; Jean Chalopin retains DIC Audiovisuel and establishes Créativité et Développement
1988	Studio B Productions is founded
1992	Epitome Pictures is founded
1993	Capital Cities/ABC purchases DIC Animation City, renaming it DIC Entertainment
1994	Both Wild Brain and Red Rover Studios were founded
1995	Platinum Disc Corporation is founded
1996	The Walt Disney Company purchases Capital Cities/ABC, which included DIC Entertainment as well CINAR buys FilmFair's library
1997	Decode Entertainment is founded
1999	Wild Brain acquires Colossal Pictures' employee base
2000	Andy Heyward re-acquires DIC Entertainment from The Walt Disney Company with help this time around from both Bain Capital and Chase Capital Partners
2001–2002	Nerd Corps Entertainment and Kidrobot are founded FilmFair London closes DIC Entertainment rebrands themselves onscreen as The Incredible World of DIC
2004	Halifax Film Company is founded Michael Hirsh takes over CINAR and renames it as Cookie Jar Group
2005	Platinum Disc Corporation merge as Echo Bridge Home Entertainment
2006	Decode and Halifax Film merge as DHX Media; DIC Entertainment acquires CPLG; Ragdoll Productions forms a joint-venture with BBC Worldwide called Ragdoll Worldwide; Wild Brain acquires stake in Kidrobot
2007	DHX Media buys Studio B Productions; Wild Brain becomes Wildbrain Entertainment
2008	Cookie Jar Group purchases and folds DIC Entertainment; House of Cool absorbs Red Rover Studios
2010	DHX Media buys Wildbrain Entertainment; Peanuts Worldwide is founded Decode Entertainment rebrands as DHX Media Toronto; Halifax Film becomes DHX Media Halifax
2011	DHX Media Toronto, Studio B Productions and Red Rover Studios close
2012	DHX Media buys Cookie Jar Group; Wildbrain Entertainment acquires Kidrobot as a whole
2013	DHX Media acquires Ragdoll Worldwide from Ragdoll Productions and BBC Worldwide; despite that though, Ragdoll Productions themselves remain independent
2014	DHX Media buys Epitome Pictures, Nerd Corps, and Echo Bridge Home Entertainment's family content library, as well as Family, the Canadian English and French Disney Junior channels, and the Canadian version of Disney XD; Cookie Jar Group shuts down National Entertainment Collectibles Association acquires Kidrobot from Wildbrain Entertainment
2016	The WildBrain multi-channel network launches Studio B and Nerd Corps merge as DHX Studios; Wildbrain Entertainment closes
2017	DHX Media buys Peanuts Worldwide and Strawberry Shortcake
2018	DHX Media Halifax becomes Island of Misfits
2019	DHX Media rebrands as WildBrain; Epitome Pictures closes the WildBrain MCN becomes WildBrain Spark
2020	CPLG becomes WildBrain CPLG
2021	Echo Bridge folds into SP Distribution
2023	WildBrain acquires House of Cool
2024	WildBrain Spark merged into its parent company as WildBrain London
2025	WildBrain announces closures of its television channels WildBrain sells Peanuts Worldwide (41% stake to Sony Pictures and Sony Music Japan)
2026	Wildbrain acquires Personality AI

=== As DHX Media ===
DHX Media logo used from 2010 to 2019

In May 2006, the Toronto-based Decode Entertainment merged with the Halifax-based Halifax Film Company as DHX Media, which went public on the Toronto Stock Exchange (TSE) and the London Alternative Investment Market (AIM). Decode's Neil Court stated that becoming a public company would allow it to raise capital for new ventures, and stated that they planned to pursue the establishment of a licensing division for consumer products. On March 25, 2008, DHX Media acquired Bulldog Interactive Fitness. The name, "DHX" drives from the combination of the names Decode and Halifax. On September 29, 2008, Entertainment One announced its intentions to purchase the company for US$63.2 million, with the deal set to close in December. The deal would fall through after Entertainment One's stock prices fell by 61%.

After the merger, Decode, Halifax Film, and Studio B Productions initially maintained their respective brands. On September 8, 2010, the company announced that all of its subsidiaries would be brought under the DHX Media branding. On September 14, 2010, DHX Media acquired the American animation studio Wildbrain Entertainment, producer of shows such as Poochini, Higglytown Heroes, and Yo Gabba Gabba!.

On August 20, 2012, it was announced that DHX Media would acquire Cookie Jar Group for CA $111 million, a deal which would make DHX the world's largest independent owner of children's television programming. The acquisition was completed on October 22, 2012.

In May 2013, DHX introduced three premium, subscription-based channels on YouTube; DHX Junior, DHX Kids, and DHX Retro. DHX's then executive chairman Michael Hirsh stated that the offerings were meant to leverage the company's library and the growth of digital distribution in the children's television market. DHX was among the first 30 content partners for YouTube's premium channel platform.

On September 16, 2013, DHX acquired Ragdoll Worldwide—a joint venture between British production company Ragdoll Productions, and BBC Worldwide that managed and licensed Ragdoll Productions properties (such as Teletubbies and In the Night Garden) outside the United Kingdom—for US$27.7 million.

==== Expansion into broadcasting, subsequent partnerships ====
On November 28, 2013, DHX announced that it would acquire four children's specialty television channels from the former Astral Media for CA$170 million, consisting of Family Channel, Disney Junior (English), Disney Junior (French), and Disney XD. The networks were being sold as a condition of Bell Media's 2013 acquisition of Astral Media; its purchase of the networks marked DHX's first foray into television broadcasting. The deal was approved by the CRTC on July 24, 2014, and closed on July 31, 2014. The channels were incorporated into a new unit, DHX Television.

In early 2014, DHX Media acquired Epitome Pictures, the company that produced the post-2001 entries of the Degrassi franchise, but Epitome did not own international distribution rights. In November, DHX purchased 117 children's and family titles from US distributor Echo Bridge Home Entertainment. The acquisition comprised about 1,200 half-hours including the international distribution rights to Degrassi, as well as Instant Star and The L.A. Complex (two other Epitome productions), as well as distribution rights to an additional 34 series. Other shows in the purchase included Lunar Jim, Beast Wars: Transformers and Cookie Jar's Emily of New Moon. Nerd Corps Entertainment, a computer animation studio founded by former Mainframe Entertainment producers Asaph Fipke and Chuck Johnson, also the makers of Slugterra, was acquired by DHX Media on December 24.

In April 2015, Corus Entertainment announced that it had acquired Canadian rights to the program library of Disney Channel and its associated brands as part of a deal with the Disney–ABC Television Group; DHX's existing deal with Disney, which covered programming across the four DHX Television services, ended in January 2016. DHX's Disney-branded channels were re-branded as Family Jr. and Télémagino in September 2015.

In August 2015, DHX reached an output deal with AwesomenessTV; the deal includes rights to its programming for Family Channel, along with plans to co-develop new, original content for DHX to distribute and merchandise internationally. In December 2015, DHX reached an output deal with DreamWorks Animation, which included Canadian rights to its original animated television series, and a pact to co-produce 130 episodes of animated programming for the Family networks, with DHX handling Canadian distribution and DreamWorks handling international distribution. Also that month, DHX established a development deal with Mattel to co-develop and handle global sales for content in the Little People and Polly Pocket franchises, as well as HiT Entertainment properties owned by them such as the Bob the Builder and Fireman Sam franchises, including television and digital video programming.

In February 2016, DHX consolidated most of its studio operations under the new division DHX Studios, with operations in Vancouver, Halifax, and Toronto. DHX also announced that it would open a new 60,000 square-foot studio in Vancouver to consolidate its 2D and CGI animation studios.

In April 2016, DHX Media announced the formation of a new London-based multi-channel network under the WildBrain name. On September 21, 2016, DHX cut a deal with Air Bud Entertainment (founded by Robert Vince) distribute the Air Bud library of 15 films, including the newest Air Bud production Pup Star.

==== Peanuts and Strawberry Shortcake acquisition, reorganizations ====
On May 10, 2017, DHX announced that it had acquired the entertainment division of Iconix Brand Group for US$345 million. The purchase gave DHX full ownership to the Strawberry Shortcake franchise and, more prominently, an 80% majority stake in Peanuts Worldwide.

On October 2, 2017, the company announced that it was evaluating strategic alternatives, including a potential sale, following a review of its finances. DHX's debt had increased following the Iconix acquisition, and the company reported a net loss of CA$18.3 million during its fiscal fourth quarter.

On May 14, 2018, DHX announced that it would sell a 39% stake (approximately 49% of its total ownership) in Peanuts Worldwide to its Japanese licensee Sony Music Entertainment Japan for US$185 million. The sale would be used to help cover DHX's debt.

On September 24, 2018, DHX announced that it had concluded its strategic review and decided against selling the company, and that it planned to prioritize investments into digital content (including short-form digital content for WildBrain, and premium long-form content for subscription streaming services such as Amazon Prime Video and Netflix), to reflect changes in viewing habits. On the same day, the company also reported a revenue of CA $434.4 million for its fiscal 2018 (up from CA $298.7 million in its fiscal 2017).

In November 2018, DHX announced the sale of its Halifax animation studio to IoM Media Ventures, a new company led by former DHX CEO Dana Landry. The Halifax animation studio had been operating on a loss. The sale was completed on December 21, 2018.

In February 2019, the company announced plans to consolidate its operations into two internal subsidiaries for "improved focus and strategic flexibility", focused on studios and networks, and global content assets (including digital) respectively. During its investors' call, then CEO Michael Donovan stated that the company had slightly downsized its slate of productions to "focus on the shows we think have the greatest potential, particularly with respect to consumer products".

=== As WildBrain ===
In August 2019, former Marvel Entertainment CEO and founder of Classic Media (now DreamWorks Classics) Eric Ellenbogen was named the new CEO of DHX Media. On September 23, 2019, the company announced that it had been changing its name to WildBrain, building upon its multi-channel network of the same name (which was subsequently renamed to "WildBrain Spark"). Company president Josh Scherba explained that the name was "synonymous with creativity, imagination and innovation", and symbolized the company's efforts to achieve stronger collaboration and integration between its businesses. DHX shareholders officially approved the change in corporate name to WildBrain Ltd. during its annual shareholder meeting in December.

On February 3, 2022, WildBrain acquired distribution, production, and licensing rights to the Jay Ward Productions portfolio; both companies will create new content based on the portfolio. The deal excluded co-productions from the Bullwinkle Studios venture that was operated by DreamWorks Classics before the new deal was made. That November, the studio made a production deal with How to Train Your Dragon producer Bonnie Arnold, through which she would produce television and film content for the studio. The first projects following the deal are set to be adaptations of Cressida Crowell's Which Way to Anywhere novel and Emily Broen series.

Josh Scherba became president and CEO of the company in 2023. WildBrain announced its intent to acquire Toronto-based animation studio House of Cool for CA$18.3 million on March 29, 2023. The acquisition was completed in July 2023. As part of the deal, House of Cool co-founders Wes Lui and Ricardo Curtis joined WildBrain as co-general managers of the studio.

In March 2023, WildBrain filed a complaint against Bell Canada with the CRTC, alleging that it was giving undue preference to competing Corus Entertainment networks and Bell Media's Crave service on its television services, in a manner that was detrimental to WildBrain's networks. WildBrain filed a similar complaint against Bell's main rival Rogers Communications, alleging similar undue preference towards Corus and the foreign streaming service Disney+ (whose Canadian advertising sales are handled by Rogers).

On November 27, 2023, New Metric Media purchased back the distribution rights to their productions from WildBrain, including Letterkenny.

==== Exit from broadcasting, sale of Peanuts ====
On December 18, 2024, WildBrain announced that it would sell a two-thirds majority stake of its television operations to IoM Media Ventures, pending CRTC approval; this would be the maximum that WildBrain could hold if it were to receive foreign investments.

In March and August 2025 respectively, the CRTC ruled that both Bell and Rogers had not given Corus channels undue preference. Bell subsequently informed WildBrain that it will not renew its carriage agreements for its networks; in April 2025, WildBrain stated that it would be renegotiating "certain aspects" of the IoM sale to account for this development.

On August 25, 2025, after Rogers also declined to renew its carriage agreements with WildBrain, the company announced that it would close all of its Canadian linear specialty channels in the coming months. CEO Josh Scherba stated that its loss of carriage from Bell and Rogers had impacted the value and commercial viability of the channels, and that the decision would have a "minimal" impact on its broader operations (including its more profitable production and licensing businesses). A company spokesperson also stated that WildBrain would no longer be subject to foreign ownership limits imposed by Canada's Broadcasting Act, meaning that it would be able to adopt a "simplified" share structure that does not restrict the voting power of non-Canadian shareholders.

In December 2025, WildBrain announced that it would sell the remainder of its holdings in Peanuts Worldwide to Sony Pictures for US$457 million, giving Sony full ownership outside of the stake held by Charles M. Schulz's family. As part of the agreement, WildBrain will continue to produce and distribute Peanuts specials and films as part of their pact with Apple TV, and WildBrain CPLG will continue to serve as its licensing agent for consumer products in the EMEA and Asia-Pacific markets (excluding Australia, New Zealand and Japan).

In August 2026, WildBrain acquired Personality AI for US$11 million.

== Businesses ==
=== Current businesses ===
- WildBrain CPLG (formerly Copyright Promotions Licensing Group), a third-party entertainment, sport and brand licensing agency headquartered in London, United Kingdom with offices around the world, became a subsidiary to WildBrain in the process of the acquisition of Cookie Jar Entertainment.
- WildBrain Distribution: WildBrain distributes television shows and specials within their library to various media platforms, territory-by-territory. The company maintains distribution offices in Toronto, Beijing, Los Angeles, New York, London, and Paris, and a support team in Toronto.
- WildBrain Studios: WildBrain maintains a production studio in Vancouver, British Columbia, and formerly operated 3 others.
  The logo of WildBrain Spark from 2019 to 2024
- WildBrain London is a multi-channel network based in London, England, that programs digital children's content on services such as YouTube—including content from WildBrain's library and properties, as well as edutainment and toys. It was formerly known as simply "WildBrain" until DHX's 2019 rebranding. The division has also entered into partnerships with other parties to manage their digital properties. The WildBrain Spark channel is among the largest children's channels on YouTube, and accounted for $70 million of WildBrain's revenue in 2019.
- House of Cool is a pre-production studio that specializes in design and storyboards for series, films and commercials.

=== Former businesses ===
- WildBrain Television: WildBrain operated four Canadian specialty television channels: three in English (Family Channel, Family Jr., and WildBrainTV) and a French-language channel (Télémagino). They were acquired in 2013 from Bell Media as part of its acquisition of Astral Media.

== See also ==
- List of WildBrain programs
