= Animal Mechanicals =

Canadian television series

- Genre: Preschool; Animated series; Science fiction comedy; Adventure; Mecha
- Created by: Jeff Rosen
- Developed by: CBC
- Written by: Jeff Rosen; Angela Vermeir; Gary Vermeir; Leila Basen; David Preston
- Directed by: Gilly Fogg
- Creative directors: Kevin Abreu; Nick Bakker
- Voices of: Jim Fowler; Leah Ostry; Shannon Lynch; Abigail Gordon; Ian MacDougall; Lenore Zann
- Theme music composer: Blain Morris
- Opening theme: "We Animal Mechanical Can!"
- Ending theme: "We Animal Mechanical Can!" (Instrumental)
- Composer: Blain Morris
- Country of origin: Canada
- Original languages: English; French
- No. of seasons: 3
- No. of episodes: 73 (list of episodes)

Production
- Executive producers: Jeff Rosen; Charles Bishop; Michael Donovan
- Producer: Katrina Walsh
- Production locations: Toronto Islands, Toronto, Ontario, Canada; Montreal, Quebec; Ottawa–Gatineau; Halifax, Nova Scotia
- Running time: 11 minutes
- Production companies: Decode Entertainment; Halifax Film

Original release
- Network: CBC Television (Kids' CBC, Canada)
- Release: September 1, 2008 – January 26, 2011

Animal Mechanicals (French: Les Super Mécanimaux) is a Canadian animated preschool children’s television series created by Jeff Rosen. Produced by Halifax Film, in association with the CBC and distributed by Decode Entertainment, the series premiered in Canada on Nick Jr. as part of the Kids' CBC on September 1, 2008 and ended on January 26, 2011.

The French-Canadian version of Animal Mechanicals is called; Les Super Mécanimaux; it aired on the French-language free-to-air television network Ici Radio-Canada Télé; starring French-Canadian voice actors Nicolas Charbonneaux-Collombet as Rex, Éveline Gélinas as Unicorn/Licorne, François Caffiaux as Komodo, Catherine Brunet as Mouse/Petite Souris, Denis Roy as Sasquatch, and Marika Lhoumeau as Island Owl/Petite chouette de l'île.

In 2019, the series was revived through the release of new nonverbal webshorts produced by WildBrain Spark Studios, a subsidiary of WildBrain that produces original content for the WildBrain Spark network. Alexander Tol provides the occasional vocal noises for the male characters, while the females are performed by Rae Reilly.

A common trope in the show is putting Mechana- in front of a lot of words.

== Characters ==
- Rex (voiced by Jim Fowler) is a green Mechana-tyrannosaurus rex. His ability is Mechana-Strong. Often, when utilizing this ability, Unicorn refers to him as being "strong like a titanium Tyrannosaurus" which, with his name and bipedal shape, would indicate that he is a robotic Tyrannosaurus rex. He is the leader of the Animal Mechanicals when they are on their journey to their mission. When he transforms, he becomes a cross between a truck, a forklift, a tractor, and a digger. He also has an obsession with food.
- Unicorn (voiced by Leah Ostry) is a pink Mechana-unicorn. Her ability is Mechana-Fly, which is when two wings appear on her back and her hooves turn into rocket boosters. The horn on her head can be made to blink like a beacon, allowing other creatures to follow her while she is flying. It can also do magic, make a whirlwind, throw lightning and light up. When flying, her legs are bent backwards and her hooves become rocket boosters, propelling her through the air. Her wings are folded inside his back, except when in use, where they provide direction and speed control. She is the only Animal Mechanical who does not walk on two legs. She is the Animal Mechanical used in the most episodes, with 51 in total.
- Komodo (voiced by Shannon Lynch) is a red Mechana-Komodo dragon who walks on two legs and wears big blue, squared glasses. His ability is Mechana-Gizmo. He can change his tail into a selection of tools and gadgets, such as a wrench, a saw, a hammer, a screwdriver a pickaxe, a tuning fork, a brush or a spatula. Often, when utilizing this ability, Unicorn either says "Handy dandy tool time." or "Tool time is cool time.", whenever he's doing his work. However, this may involve him working backwards to the line of the problem, forcing him to almost bend backwards in order to see what he is doing. He is shown to be very smart, often figuring out the small details of the problem in hand. He tends to act like a martial arts expert. In a few episodes, he reveals that he has a very sensitive stomach and legs. He often has to warn Sasquatch about "traps", even though he refuses to listen to him, and often gets hit by said "trap", then Sasquatch repeats what Komodo said before Komodo got hit then Komodo says "Why didn't I think of that?" or "You don't say...", including various other lines. He is the only Animal Mechanical to have more than one stock footage sequence. As a running gag for whenever he uses his powers, something random would be picked by mistake, including a disguise, a rubber duck, a submarine sandwich, a noisemaker, a teddy bear, his underwear, among others.
- Mouse (voiced by Abigail Gordon) is a yellow Mechana-mouse who is the youngest in the group and runs about on two pumps instead of her back feet. Her ability is Mechana-Fast, which is increased by lying flat, with her front paws on the ground, which also have wheels on them, and flattening her ears to the side of her head and extending exhaust pipes which help to propel her forwards. Her ears act like satellite dishes to catch sounds. For some reason, she laughs and giggles before Sasquatch transforms and can fit in tight places her friends cannot. Whenever Sasquatch is afraid or impatient, she always comes to hold his hand, and whenever she is scared, Sasquatch is always there to hold her hand. She also has the ability to understand creatures.
- Sasquatch (voiced by Ian MacDougall) is a blue Mechana-Bigfoot. His ability is Mechana-Stretchy. Each of his limbs extend to an incredible length. When stretched, his arms and legs are very long. However, his joints do not alter and bend as usual. In the episode, "Baboon Balloon Island", it was stated that he is allergic to air pears and in this same episode, "Dino Mountain Island", and "Mechana Skee Ball Island", he has a big anxiety and a fear of heights. He has referred to himself several times as the Mighty Sasquatch. Whenever Sasquatch is scared, Mouse always comes to hold his hand (as seen in "Jigsaw Shark Puzzle" and "Chugboat Island"), and whenever she's scared or impatient (as seen in "Dino Mountain Island" and "Snail's Pace Race"), Sasquatch always comes to hold her hand. Sasquatch often seems to disrespect Komodo's warnings by refusing to listen to what he says.
- Island Owl (voiced by Lenore Zann) is a red Mechana-owl and the team's commander that only appears at the beginning of each episode, giving the team's their mission. Her head resembles a television set, which begins briefly showing her face, then changes to show a representation of the island to which the Animal Mechanicals are to be sent. She does not accompany the Animal Mechanicals, after they have left to go on their mission as she is not heard from or seen again and looks after the Animal Mechanicals' home; however she is mentioned by Komodo whenever someone breaks a rule.

== Episodes ==
Season	Episodes	Originally released	
Season	Episodes	First released	Last released
1	20	September 1, 2008	September 26, 2008
2	20	December 22, 2008	January 16, 2009
3	33	December 13, 2010	January 26, 2011

== Broadcast ==
The show is broadcast in Canada on CBC Television in the Kids' CBC programming block, weekdays at 7:30 am. It was also broadcast on Playhouse Disney, later Disney Junior in the United Kingdom and Italy. In Latin America, it was broadcast in Discovery Kids and Discovery Familia on January 19, 2009 until early 2013, the digital cable channels owned by Discovery Networks, and Discovery, Inc., in a Spanish or Portuguese (in Brazil) dubbed version and are called Mecanimales (Spanish) or Mecanimais (Portuguese). It is dubbed in Irish on Cúla 4 ná nóg, the children's portion of TG4 in Ireland. The series premiered in the United States on October 11, 2010 on The Hub. In Israel, it was broadcast on Hop! Channel in 2011, in a Hebrew-dubbed version. In the Arab world it was broadcast on Baraem in 2009, in an Arabic-dubbed version.
