= Wildbrain Entertainment =

American animation studio and entertainment company

Wildbrain Entertainment, Inc.
- Final logo used from August 20, 2007 to February 24, 2016.
- Formerly: Wild Brain (1994–2007)
- Type: Subsidiary
- Industry: Animation; Entertainment
- Predecessor: Colossal Pictures; BIG Pictures
- Founded: March 25, 1994; 32 years ago
- Founders: John Hays; Phil Robinson; Jeff Fino
- Defunct: February 24, 2016; 10 years ago
- Fate: Folded into DHX Media
- Successors: WildBrain London; WildBrain; WildBrain Studios
- Headquarters: Los Angeles, California, U.S. New York City, New York, U.S. San Francisco, California, U.S.
- Area served: Worldwide
- Products: Television series, specials, television commercials, licensed merchandise
- Parent: DHX Media (2010–2016)
- Divisions: Wildbrain Animation; Ghostbot
- Website: wildbrain.com

Wildbrain Entertainment, Inc. (commonly known as Wildbrain, stylized as W!LDBRAIN, formerly known as Wild Brain, and later known as DHX Media Los Angeles) was an American animation studio and entertainment company that developed and produced television programming, motion pictures, commercial content, and licensed merchandise. Established in 1994, it maintained offices in Los Angeles, New York City, and San Francisco.

Its film productions included the Annie Award-winning computer-animated short film Hubert's Brain, while its television work included the Nick Jr. series Bubble Guppies and Yo Gabba Gabba!, and the Disney Channel series Higglytown Heroes. Wildbrain also produced earlier animated shorts and television specials of Monster High for Mattel.

They have produced national commercials for clients such as Esurance, Chiclets, Target, Nike, Honda, Kraft, The Wall Street Journal, and Lamisil (featuring Digger the Dermatophyte). Their ad work has won Clio Awards, ADDY Awards, BDA Awards, and Annie Awards. A subsidiary, Kidrobot, creates limited edition toys, clothing, artwork, and books. It had stores in New York City, Los Angeles, San Francisco, and Miami.

The studio was sold to DHX Media in 2010 for US$8 million, and was dissolved in 2012. In 2016, DHX revived the Wildbrain trademark for a new YouTube multi-channel network serving its properties and others, known as WildBrain. In 2019, DHX announced that it would rebrand as WildBrain to reflect the division's growth and prominence within the company.

== History ==
In 1994, John Hays, Phil Robinson, and Jeff Fino founded Wild Brain in the Castro District of San Francisco, California. The new company bootstrapped with contract work from local game companies such as Broderbund, LucasArts, and Living Books. In 1996, Wild Brain moved to a 17,000 square foot warehouse at the corner of 18th St. and York St. in the Mission District spearheading the growth of what came to be known in San Francisco as Multimedia Gulch. In 1999, Austin, Texas-based Interfase Capital invested almost $17 million in Wild Brain.

Over the next few years, Wild Brain's staff ballooned from a staff of about 20 to about 250. It struck deals with Yahoo! and Cartoon Network to produce animated shorts for the web. It launched wildbrain.com, creating animated web shorts such as "Groove Monkee", "Mantelope", and numerous web series including Joe Paradise, Glue, Graveyard, and Space is Dum.

After legendary studio Colossal Pictures closed down in 1999, and with the financial backing of the Interfase companies, Wild Brain expanded further, providing employment for former Colossal directors and staff. Around this period, they produced the series Higglytown Heroes and Poochini.

In 2004, Charles Rivkin, former CEO of The Jim Henson Company, joined Wild Brain as president and CEO. Rivkin oversaw the creation and development of the series Yo Gabba Gabba! for Nick Jr.

In 2007, former founder Jeff Fino left to start Nuvana, an educational web-based company with former Colossal Pictures producer, Joe Kwong. Wild Brain rebranded to Wildbrain Entertainment that same year.

In 2008, Rivkin left Wildbrain after being named U.S. ambassador to France and Monaco. Michael Polis, the marketing director of Wildbrain, then became the new CEO.

Around this time, John Hays left Wildbrain to work on indie features La Mission and Howl, which opened the 2010 Sundance Film Festival.

By 2009, the original founders of the company had all left Wildbrain. The company expanded its animation studios to Sherman Oaks in March, then closed its San Francisco office in June. It had been an independent company until Canadian studio DHX Media purchased Wildbrain in 2010. That same year, Phil Robinson and Amy Capen, executive producer of Wildbrain's San Francisco studio, started an independent company called Special Agent Productions. Robinson died in 2015 after a short battle with pancreatic cancer.

In 2016, DHX Media revived the Wildbrain name for a new London-based multi-channel network known as WildBrain. The division would focus on YouTube channels aimed towards children, including content and original series drawn from DHX's properties, as well as other forms of educational and toy-oriented content. In September 2019, DHX Media announced that it would change its name to WildBrain outright, with the MCN unit being renamed WildBrain Spark.

== Filmography ==
=== Television series ===
- What a Cartoon! (1995–1997) (some shorts)
- KaBlam! (1997) (The Brothers Tiki shorts)
- O Canada (1997) (opening title and bumpers)
- Acme Hour (1997) (opening, bumpers and closing)
- Oh Yeah! Cartoons (1998) ("Fathead")
- Space is Dum (1999–2001)
- Pajama Party (2000) (opening title)
- Poochini (2000–2002)
- The Chuck Jones Show (2001) (opening title)
- Higglytown Heroes (2004–2008)
- Yo Gabba Gabba! (2007–2015)
- Team Smithereen (2009–2011)
- The Ricky Gervais Show (2010–2012)
- The Hard Times of RJ Berger (2010–2011)
- Monster High (2010–2012)
- Bubble Guppies (2011) (season 1)
- The Aquabats! Super Show! (2012–2014)
- UMIGO (2012–2014)
- Sheriff Callie's Wild West (2014–2015) (season 1)

=== Films ===
- FernGully 2: The Magical Rescue (1998)
- Dudley Do-Right (1999) (animation)
- The Adventures of Rocky and Bullwinkle (2000) (2D traditional animation)
- Cats & Dogs (2001) (Egypt animation)
- Rat Race (2001) (opening title sequence)
- Dopamine (2003) (CGI animation)
- Howl (2010) (animation)
- Happiness Is a Warm Blanket, Charlie Brown (2011) (television special)

=== Short films ===
- Out in Space (1997)
- Humanstein (1998)
- A Dog Cartoon (1998)
- Web Premiere Toons (1999–2001)
- El Kabong Rides Again (2001)
- Hubert's Brain (2001)
- Anita Bomba (2001)
- Erin Esurance in "Carbon Copy" (2007)
- Disrespectoids (2010)

=== Video games ===
- Living Books: The Berenstain Bears Get in a Fight (1995) (animation)
- Living Books: Green Eggs and Ham (1996)
- NeoHunter (1996) (character design and animation)
- Play-Doh Creations (1996) (animation)
- Flying Saucer (1997)
- Rugrats Adventure Game (1998) (additional art and animation)
- Star Wars: Jar Jar's Journey Adventure Book (1999)
- Where in the World Is Carmen Sandiego? Treasures of Knowledge (2001) (character design)
- The Oregon Trail 5th Edition (2001) (character design)
- Baten Kaitos: Eternal Wings and the Lost Ocean (2003) (2D animation)
- Sideway: New York (2011) (animation)

=== Commercials ===
- Animax (1998) (with Mercury Filmworks)
- Cap'n Crunch (2003–2007)
- Cartoon Network/Tennis Industry Association (1997)
- Century Theatres (2000)
- Cheetos (2001)
- Chicago Transit Authority (2004)
- Chiclets (2004)
- Chips Ahoy! (1999)
- Coca-Cola (1996, 1998, 2005)
  - Sprite (1998)
- Dreyer's (2002)
- Esurance (2004–2009)
- Ford Motor Company (1999, 2001)
- Fruitsnackia (2012–2016)
- Green Giant (1999, 2003)
- Helados (1998) (with Mercury Filmworks)
- Hershey's Kisses (1998–1999, 2002)
- Honda Element (2005–2008)
- KFC (1998–2000)
- Kraft Singles (2003)
- Jolly Rancher (2001)
- Kid Cuisine (2001)
- Lamisil (2003–2005)
- Levi's (1998)
- Locomotion (1997)
- Lunchables (2004–2008)
- Mainstay Mutual Funds (1996) (with Little Fluffy Clouds)
- Nike (1996, 1999)
- NTB (1997–1998)
- Noggin (1999)
- Norfolk Southern (2001)
- Oreo O's (2002)
- Parfums de Coeur (1999, 2001)
- PBS Kids (2005)
- Pebbles (2002–2004)
- Reese's Sticks (1999)
- Rice Krispies (1998)
- Ritz Crackers (2000–2001)
- Scandinavian Designs (2000)
- Secret Central (2003)
- Sony Music Entertainment (2000)
- The SpongeBob SquarePants Movie (2004)
- STP (1996)
- Target Corporation (2001)
- Tropicana (2003)
- The Wall Street Journal (2002)
- The Willy Wonka Candy Company (1998–2000, 2004)
- Winterfresh (2001)
- Virgin America (2007)
- Visine (2001)
- Xerox Document Centre (1997)

== Staff ==
=== Executives ===
- Michael Polis
- Marge Dean
- David Graber
- Bob Higgins
- Amy Capen
- Jeff Fino (1994–2007)
- Scott Hyten
- Jeff Ulin
- Charles Rivkin (2004–2008)
- Paul Golden (1996–2001)

=== Directors ===
- Chris Hauge
- George Evelyn
- Paul Fierlinger
- Denis Morella
- Scott Schultz
- Phil Robinson (March 1995–July 2009)
- John Hays
- Ed Bell
- Robin Steele
- Dave Marshall
- Dave Thomas
- Dave Feiss (2000–2002)
- Roque Ballesteros (2000–2001; 2006–2007)

=== Animators ===
- Dave Thomas
- Sean Dicken (August 1999–August 2001; July 2003–September 2006; May 2007–October 2009)
- Jeff Nevins
- Alex Currier
- Sam Hood
- Roque Ballesteros (1998–2000)
- Rob Lily (2009–2010)
- Nick Butera (2010–2012?)
- Lyndon Ruddy
- John Korellis
- Gordon Clark
- Achiu So
- Patricia Ross
- Cindy Ng
- Marcelo de Souza
- Nick Hewitt
- Marc Perry
- Scott Morse
