= WildBrain CPLG =

Brand licensing agency

- Logo used since 2020
- Formerly: Copyright Promotions Licensing Group (1974–2020)
- Type: Subsidiary
- Traded as: CPLG
- Founded: March 4, 1974; 52 years ago
- Headquarters: London, England
- Services: Brand licensing
- Parent: DIC Entertainment (2006–2008); Cookie Jar Group (2008–2012); WildBrain (Note: Known as DHX Media until September 23, 2019) (2012–present)
- Website: cplg.com

WildBrain CPLG (formerly Copyright Promotions Licensing Group, also known as CPLG) is a brand licensing agency founded on March 4, 1974. Headquartered in London, CPLG also operates offices in Paris, Barcelona, Milan, Amsterdam, Lisbon and Munich and has recently expanded its global reach by opening new offices in Toronto and Japan.

== History ==
=== Private licensing company (1974–2006) ===
Original logo used until 2020.

CPLG once represented licensors across three divisions: entertainment, sport, and design. Entertainment brands included Elvis, Spider-Man, Peanuts, World Wide Wrestling, Bob the Builder, Sesame Street, LazyTown, Star Trek, Felix the Cat, and Where's Waldo. England Rugby, England football, England Cricket as well as St Andrews Links and World Rally Championship are licensed under CPLG's Sport division. Design brands include Skelanimlas, Valerie Tabor Smith, Janneike Brinkman and Whatever It Takes.

=== DIC and Cookie Jar Group Subsidiary (2006–2012) ===
In 2006, CPLG was acquired by DIC Entertainment, which in turn, merged with Cookie Jar Group in 2008. The merger between Cookie Jar Group and DIC Entertainment was finalized when Cookie Jar Group paid US $31.5 million to cover outstanding equity with DIC. The total value of the deal was $87.6 million.

=== DHX Media/WildBrain Subsidiary (2012–present) ===
In October 2012, CPLG's parent company, Cookie Jar Group, was acquired by fellow Canadian media company DHX Media (today WildBrain), with ownership of CPLG shifting to that company.

In 2020, after the rebranding of DHX to WildBrain, CPLG was renamed WildBrain CPLG.
