= List of Animal Mechanicals episodes =

This is a complete list of episodes from the animated television show Animal Mechanicals.

== Series overview ==
Season	Episodes	Originally released	
Season	Episodes	First released	Last released
1	20	September 1, 2008	September 26, 2008
2	20	December 22, 2008	January 16, 2009
3	33	December 13, 2010	January 26, 2011

== Episodes ==
=== Season 1 (2008) ===
No. overall	No. in season	Title	Original air date	Prod. code
1	1	"Turbo Bean Trouble"	September 1, 2008	102
The Animal Mechanicals plant a Turbo Bean, which turns out to be a difficult task when it flies away.
2	2	"Bunny Boomer Island"	September 2, 2008	103
The Animal Mechanicals help the bunnies build their Bunny Boomer.
3	3	"Cow Castle Hassle"	September 3, 2008	107
The Animal Mechanicals help the Cow Castle get to the meadow on the other side of the Pop Rocket Corn field.
4	4	"Whale Plane Island"	September 4, 2008	106
The Animal Mechanicals build a runway long enough for the Whale Plane to land on.
5	5	"Dino Mountain Island"	September 5, 2008	109
The Animal Mechanicals get to the top of the Dino Mountain to remove a cog stuck in its teeth.
6	6	"Chickadee Island"	September 8, 2008	108
The Animals Mechanicals help the Mother Chickadee hatch her eggs.
7	7	"Beetle Buggy Island"	September 9, 2008	104
The Animal Mechanicals clear a traffic jam of Beetle Buggies.
8	8	"Pop Apart Penguins"	September 10, 2008	105
The Animal Mechanicals build a bigger igloo for the Pop Apart Penguins.
9	9	"Jigsaw-Shark Puzzle"	September 11, 2008	101
The Animal Mechanicals build a jigsaw puzzle with the help of the Jigsaw Sharks.
10	10	"Bell Bot Island"	September 12, 2008	110
The Animal Mechanicals find the missing Bell Bots so they can ring their bells.
11	11	"The Elephant Train"	September 15, 2008	111
The Animal Mechanicals help the Elephant Train get to the other side of the tracks so it can deliver its snow cones.
12	12	"Mechana-Pinball Island"	September 16, 2008	112
The Animal Mechanicals play a Mechana-Pinball game.
13	13	"Giraffe Crane Island"	September 17, 2008	113
The Animal Mechanicals help the Giraffe Cranes build a structure by getting more logs.
14	14	"Flying Glitterfish Island"	September 18, 2008	114
The Animal Mechanicals find a missing Power Bubble.
15	15	"Snail's Pace Race"	September 19, 2008	115
The Animal Mechanicals get the Racing Snails to race, but this is made difficult by a Cog Caterpillar blocking the track.
16	16	"Mechana-Bat Island"	September 22, 2008	116
The Animal Mechanicals make the bat cave bigger for the Mechana-Bats to perform their show.
17	17	"Hippo Hovercraft Island"	September 23, 2008	117
The Animal Mechanicals fix the worn-out bumpers of the Hippo Hovercraft.
18	18	"Balloon Volcano Island"	September 24, 2008	118
The Animal Mechanicals find what is popping all the balloons created by the Balloon Volcano, that being the long spikes of Mechana-Hedgehogs.
19	19	"Mechana-Dragonfly Island"	September 25, 2008	119
The Animal Mechanicals repair a crashed Mechana-Dragonfly to get her flying again.
20	20	"Mechana-Parrot Island"	September 26, 2008	120
The Animal Mechanicals help the Mechana-Parrot sing her song by feeding her the seeds of a Screwtop Sunflower.

=== Season 2 (2008–09) ===
No. overall	No. in season	Title	Original air date
21	1	"Cobra Coaster Island"	December 22, 2008
The Animal Mechanicals get the Cobra Coaster running by removing a monkey on the track.
22	2	"Pop-Out Panda Island"	December 23, 2008
The Animal Mechanicals help the Pop-Out Pandas get to the top of the slippery mountain so they can have their bamboo.
23	3	"Mechana Cuckoo Clock Island"	December 24, 2008
The Animal Mechanicals place the lost numbers of a Mechana-Cuckoo Clock back on its face with the help of the clock's cuckoo bird.
24	4	"Trash Masher Island"	December 25, 2008
The Animal Mechanicals help the Mechana-Beaver recycle all the trash.
25	5	"Mechana Dancing Bear Island"	December 26, 2008
The Animal Mechanicals fix the music from a Mechana-Band, which is causing the Dancing Bears to dance strangely.
26	6	"Puffer Cloud Island"	December 29, 2008
The Animal Mechanicals help the Puffer Cloud Machine feel better.
27	7	"Baboon Balloon Island"	December 30, 2008
The Animal Mechanicals get the Baboon Balloon to soar again by feeding it an air pear.
28	8	"Mechana Matcher Island"	December 31, 2008
The Animal Mechanicals help the Mechana-Matcher, who is constantly mismatching items.
29	9	"Mechana Skee Ball Island"	January 1, 2009
The Animal Mechanicals fix the broken ski jump.
30	10	"Chugboat Island"	January 2, 2009
The Animal Mechanicals repair the lighthouse to get the Chugboats to their docks.
31	11	"Shimmer Wish Island"	January 5, 2009
The Animal Mechanicals free the Shimmer Queen from a Sucker Bush.
32	12	"Mechana Snow Owl Island"	January 6, 2009
The Animal Mechanicals try to crown the new Snow Owl King, which is made difficult by the snow melting.
33	13	"Mechana Racer Island"	January 7, 2009
The Animal Mechanicals fix a broken Mechana-Racer.
34	14	"Mechana Kanga Bounce Ball Island"	January 8, 2009
The Animal Mechanicals create a new trampoline for the kangaroos.
35	15	"Mechana Tulip Island"	January 9, 2009
The Animal Mechanicals get the Mechana-Bees to work on collecting nectar instead of playing.
36	16	"Mechana Skate Park Island"	January 12, 2009
The Animal Mechanicals help the Racoon Rollers after they keep slipping.
37	17	"Robo Ranch Island"	January 13, 2009
The Animal Mechanicals capture a Mechana-Bull after it escapes from its pen.
38	18	"Mechana Tortoise Island"	January 14, 2009
The Animal Mechanicals get the Mechana-Tortoise to his birthday party.
39	19	"Mechana Jukebox Island"	January 15, 2009
The Animal Mechanicals get the Be-Boppers dancing by fixing a jukebox.
40	20	"Mechana Circus Island"	January 16, 2009
The Animal Mechanicals bring the performers to the Mechana-Circus Train so it can take off.

=== Season 3 (2010–11) ===
No. overall	No. in season	Title	Original air date
41	1	"Mechana Package Pigeon Island"	December 13, 2010
The Animal Mechanicals get a package factory working after feeding the Mechana-Hamster that powers it treats.
42	2	"Mechana Chicken Springing Island"	December 14, 2010
The Animal Mechanicals fix the Chicken Springer so it can fling the chickens for the chicken springing competition.
43	3	"Mechana Marching Ant Island"	December 15, 2010
The Animal Mechanicals help the Marching Ants march properly after fixing holes on the path.
44	4	"Beardozer Island"	December 16, 2010
The Animal Mechanicals help the baby Beardozers after they wake up from hibernation early.
45	5	"Mechana Buffalo Bus Island"	December 17, 2010
The Animal Mechanicals get the Chipmunk Tourists on the Buffalo Bus, which is made difficult when the bus starts moving.
46	6	"Mechana Meteor Island"	December 20, 2010
The Animal Mechanicals fix the Observatory Owl's telescope so it can watch the meteors.
47	7	"Mechana Monkey Island"	December 21, 2010
The Animal Mechanicals bring a banana to the top of the mountain, but the challenges make the mission easier said than done.
48	8	"Mechana Puffin Prize Island"	December 22, 2010
The Animal Mechanicals go through an obstacle course made by the Mechana-Puffins.
49	9	"Mechana Mole Miner Island"	December 23, 2010
The Animal Mechanicals help the Mole Miners get their gold back from Mechana-Crows.
50	10	"Babble Bot Island"	December 24, 2010
The Animal Mechanicals get Mechana-Zappers to charge the Babble Bots so they can talk again.
51	11	"Tiger Knight Island"	December 27, 2010
The Animal Mechanicals deliver an Energy Emerald to the Tiger Knight Captain by solving various challenges along the way.
52	12	"Mechana Hawk Rocket Island"	December 28, 2010
The Animal Mechanicals get the Giraffe Crane that delivers the packages to the Hawk Rocket.
53	13	"Mechana Koala Cake Day"	December 29, 2010
The Animal Mechanicals help the koalas get to their cake by getting Mechana-Seahorses to power their Crab Catamaran.
54	14	"Mechana Paint Parrot Island"	December 30, 2010
The Animal Mechanicals get more paint for the Paint Parrots.
55	15	"Mechana Pegosaurus Island"	December 31, 2010
In an homage to The Three Little Pigs, the Animal Mechanicals protect three pigs from the falling pegs of a Pegosaurus.
56	16	"Mechana Spider Sailor Island"	January 3, 2011
The Animal Mechanicals get the baby Spider Sailors down from the top of the mountain.
57	17	"Mechana Ski Sheep Island"	January 4, 2011
The Animal Mechanicals help the Ski Sheep properly slide down the slope, to do this, they repair the Ski Patrol Sheepdog.
58	18	"Mechana Balloonosaurus Island"	January 5, 2011
The Animal Mechanicals prevent the balloons created by the Balloonosaurus from being blown away by a Snoreosaurus.
59	19	"Mechana Race Rabbit Island"	January 6, 2011
The Animal Mechanicals monitor the Race Rabbits to ensure they race fairly.
60	20	"Mechana Maple Syrup Squirrel Island"	January 7, 2011
The Animal Mechanicals help the squirrels by shooing away a Mechana-Moose that keeps drinking the sap they use for making maple syrup.
61	21	"Mechana Turkey Trotter Island"	January 10, 2011
The Animal Mechanicals prevent the Turkey Trotters from falling by removing a Mechana-Worm that is causing earthquakes.
62	22	"Mechana Rhino Ring Toss Island"	January 11, 2011
The Animal Mechanicals fix the Croc Ring Tosser so the Mechana-Rhinos can play ring toss.
63	23	"Mechana Copycat Island"	January 12, 2011
The Animal Mechanicals stop the hiccups of the Mechana-Copycat so it can correctly make toys for the koalas.
64	24	"Mechana Coconut Island"	January 13, 2011
The Animal Mechanicals help the Mechana-Camels deliver coconuts to the factory.
65	25	"Mechana Fireworks Firefly Island"	January 14, 2011
The Animal Mechanicals go to a fireworks show hosted by the Mechana-Fireworks Fireflies.
66	26	"Mechana Peeper Island"	January 17, 2011
The Animal Mechanicals stop bamboo from sprouting under the Peepers' houses by freeing a Clipper Crab.
67	27	"Mechana Cable Carp Island"	January 18, 2011
The Animal Mechanicals fix a bolt tree to send the baby Cable Carps back home.
68	28	"Mechana Sand Castle Clam Island"	January 19, 2011
The Animal Mechanicals build a sand castle for a sand castle contest.
69	29	"Mechana Toucan Treasure Island"	January 20, 2011
The Animal Mechanicals go on a treasure hunt with the Treasure Toucans.
70	30	"Mechana Hide 'N Seek Hamster Island"	January 21, 2011
The Animal Mechanicals find a missing hamster, who is stuck in the structure.
71	31	"Mechana Mini Golf Gopher Island"	January 24, 2011
The Animal Mechanicals play on the Mechana-Gophers' mini golf course.
72	32	"Mechana Origami Owl Island"	January 25, 2011
The Animal Mechanicals supply wood for the Paper Platypus Maker to provide more paper for the Origami Owls.
73	33	"Mechana Cricket King Island"	January 26, 2011
The Animal Mechanicals determine who is the new Cricket King by conducting tests for height, distance, and speed.

=== WildBrain Spark webseries (2019) ===
1. The Buried Treasure
2. The Great Ocean Wave
3. The Mysterious Sandcastle
4. The Pirate Ship
5. Shark Attack Prank
6. The UFO Invasion
7. The Bird Egg
8. Building a Treehouse
9. Hungry Animals
10. Rex Goes Pop!
11. Rex's Frozen Tongue!
12. Building a Snowman
13. Cave In!
14. Snow Sports!
15. Volcano Explosion!
