= WildBrain London =

YouTube MCN owned by WildBrain

WildBrain Family International Limited
- Trade name: WildBrain London
- Formerly: WildBrain (2016–2019); WildBrain Spark (2019–2024)
- Type: Subsidiary
- Industry: Digital media
- Predecessor: Wildbrain Entertainment
- Founded: 25 April 2016; 10 years ago
- Headquarters: London, England
- Number of locations: 4
- Area served: Worldwide
- Parent: WildBrain
- Divisions: WildBrain Digital Studios
- Website: www.wildbrain.com/content-creation/digital-studio

The logo of WildBrain Spark from 2019 to 2024

WildBrain Family International Limited, operating as WildBrain London (formerly WildBrain and WildBrain Spark), is a British multi-channel network owned by Canadian media company WildBrain (formerly DHX Media). It distributes and produces preschool and children's video content for YouTube and other digital platforms. The division officially launched in 2016; it reuses trademarks associated with Wildbrain Entertainment, an animation studio that had been acquired by DHX. It maintains offices in London.

The division is responsible for distributing pre-existing material and creating original animated and live-action shorts based on properties owned by its parent company and partners. WildBrain London also manages the YouTube presence for a number of external brands and businesses, including Beyblade Burst, Bing, Grizzy & the Lemmings, Hasbro, Larva, Moomins, Mr. Bean Animated, Outfit7, Playmobil, The Smurfs, Spin Master, NBCUniversal, Turbozaurs and Warner Bros. Discovery, among others.

To reflect the growth and prominence of the division, DHX Media announced in September 2019 that it would change its name to WildBrain. The MCN was subsequently renamed WildBrain Spark.

In November 2023, WildBrain Spark merged into its parent company under its YouTube network business in London, along with Digital Studios and Media Solutions, and it was completed in January 2024 with Kate Smith appointed as Executive Vice-president for Audience Engagement.

== Productions ==
- Akedo: Ultimate Arcade Warriors (2021–present) (produced with Moose Toys)
- Animal Mechanicals (2019)
- BFF Bright Fairy Friends (2020–2022)
- Boy & Dragon (2019–present)
- Brum (2016)
- Brum & Friends (2017–present)
- Caillou's New Adventures (2016–2023)
- Crayola Scribble Scrubbie Pets (2020–present)
- DJ Lance and the Upbeat Retreat! (2017–2018)
- Eena Meena Deeka (2020–present) (season 3) (produced with Cosmos-Maya)
- The Ellie Sparkles Show (2017)
- Emojitown (2021–present) (season 1) (produced with Emoji Company)
- Hairdorables (2018–2020)
- Hydro and Fluid (2018–present) (season 2) (produced with Alopra)
- Johnny Test: The Lost Web Series (2020; 2026)
- Kiddyzuzaa Land (2018–2019)
- Kiwi & Strit (TBA) (season 3) (produced with Copenhagen Bombay)
- Peanuts (2018–2019)
- Polly Pocket (2018–present)
- Popeye's Island Adventures (2018–2019)
- Slugisodes (2020) (produced with Epic Story Media)
- Strawberry Shortcake (2018)
- Strawberry Shortcake: Berry in the Big City (2021–2024) (produced by WildBrain Studios)
- Super Binks (2020–2021) (produced with Park Star Media)
- Through the Fairy Door (2019)
- Tiddlytubbies (2018–present)
- Teletubbies: Let's Go! (2022–present)
- Tulipop (2017–2019)

== Programs streaming on YouTube ==
- Abby Hatcher (2019–2022)
- Action Man (1995–1996)
- The Adrenaline Project (2007–2009) (through MarbleMedia's MarbleKids channel)
- The Adventures of Paddington Bear (1997–2000)
- Adventures of Sonic the Hedgehog (1993–1996)
- The Adventures of Super Mario Bros. 3 (1990)
- Alva's World (2021–present)
- Angela Anaconda (1999–2001)
- Alienators: Evolution Continues (2001–2002)
- Animal Mechanicals (2008–2011)
- Archie's Weird Mysteries (1999–2000)
- Are You Afraid of the Dark? (1992–2000)
- AstroLOLogy (2018–present)
- Bakugan (2023–2024)
- Bakugan Battle Brawlers (2008–2009)
- Bakugan: Battle Planet (2018–2023)
- Ben & Holly's Little Kingdom (2008–2013)
- Being Ian (2005–2008), (through Nelvana's Keep It Weird (film) and Treehouse Direct (season 3) channels)
- Beverly Hills Teens (1987)
- Beyblade Burst (2015–2023)
- Billy Bricks (2016–present)
- Bing (2014–2019)
- Bo on the Go! (2007–2011)
- Bob the Builder (1999) (1999–2011)
- Bob the Builder (2015) (2015–2018)
- Boohbah (2003–2006)
- Braceface (2001–2004), (through Nelvana's Keep It Weird channel for 13 episodes)
- Brave Bunnies (2021–present)
- Brum (1991–2001)
- Bump in the Night (TV series) (1994–1995)
- Busytown Mysteries (2007–2010)
- The Busy World of Richard Scarry (1994–1997)
- Caillou (1997–2010)
- Captain N: The Game Master (1989–1991)
- Cave Club (2020–2021)
- Chip and Potato (2018–2021)
- Chuggington (2008–2021)
- Class of the Titans (2005–2008) (through Nelvana's Retro Rerun channel)
- Cloudy with a Chance of Meatballs (2017–2018)
- The Country Mouse and the City Mouse Adventures (1998–1999)
- Curious George (2006–2022)
- The Deep (2015–2022)
- Degrassi High (1989–1991)
- Degrassi Junior High (1987–1989)
- Degrassi: The Next Generation (2001–2015)
- Dennis the Menace (1986–1988)
- Dino Ranch (2021–2024)
- DinoSquad (2007–2008)
- Dipdap (2011)
- The Doodlebops (2005–2007)
- Doodlebops Rockin' Road Show (2010)
- Dorg Van Dango (2020–2021)
- Double Dragon (1993–1994)
- Dr. Dimensionpants (2014–2015)
- Endangered Species (2015)
- The Fabulous Show with Fay and Fluffy (2022–2024)
- Fimbles (2002–2004)
- Fireman Sam (1987–2025)
- The Fixies (2010–present)
- Franny's Feet (2003–2010)
- Gadget & the Gadgetinis (2002–2003)
- Gadget Boy & Heather (1995–1998)
- Gaming Show (In My Parents' Garage) (2014–2016)
- Grizzy & the Lemmings (2016–present)
- Heathcliff (1984–1985)
- Hero Dad (2019–present)
- Heroes of Goo Jit Zu (2019)
- The Hoobs (2001–2003) (Thru Jim Henson's Family Hub channel)
- Horrid Henry (2006–2019)
- Horseland (2006–2008)
- Hot Wheels: Battle Force 5 (2009–2011), (Thru Nelvana's Cartoon Power Up channel)
- In the Night Garden... (2007–2009)
- Inspector Gadget (1983–2018)
- Inspector Gadget's Field Trip (1996–1998)
- Instant Star (2004–2008)
- The Jangles (2023)
- Johnny Test (2005–2014)
- Jungle Beat (2003–present)
- Kid vs. Kat (2008–2011)
- The Kids of Degrassi Street (1979-1986)
- Kongsuni and Friends (2014–present)
- Kung Fu Dino Posse (2010–2011)
- The L.A. Complex (2011–2013)
- Larva (2011–present)
- LazyTown (2004–2014)
- League of Super Evil (2009–2012)
- The Legend of Zelda (1989)
- Lego Dreamzzz (2023–2025)
- Lego Friends (2012–present)
- Liberty's Kids (2002–2003)
- Life with Derek (2005–2009)
- The Little Lulu Show (1995–1999)
- Little People (2016–2018)
- Lunar Jim (2006–2007)
- M.A.S.K. (1985–1986)
- Madeline (1993–2001)
- Mighty Express (2020–2022)
- Mona the Vampire (1999–2006, 2011)
- Monster Math Squad (2012)
- Mr. Bean: The Animated Series (2002–present)
- My Little Pony: Friendship Is Magic (2010–2019)
- My Little Pony: Make Your Mark (2022–2023)
- My Little Pony: Pony Life (2020–2021)
- Mummies Alive! (1997)
- Naturally, Sadie (2005–2007)
- Ninjago (2011–2022)
- Open Heart (2015)
- Paw Patrol (2013–present)
- Peppa Pig (2004–present)
- Pingu (1990–2006)
- Pip and Posy (2021–present)
- Pirates: Adventures in Art (2010–2011)
- PJ Masks (2015–2024)
- Pole Position (1984)
- Rainbow Ruby (2016–2020)
- Redakai: Conquer the Kairu (2011–2013)
- Rev & Roll (2019)
- Ricky Zoom (2019–2021)
- Roary the Racing Car (2007–2010)
- The Roly Mo Show (2005–2006)
- Rosie and Jim (1990–2000)
- Rubble & Crew (2023–present)
- Sabrina: The Animated Series (1999)
- Simon's Cat (2008–present)
- Slugterra (2012–2016)
- The Smurfs (1981) (1981–1989)
- The Smurfs (2021) (2021–present)
- Sonic The Hedgehog (1993–1994)
- Sonic Underground (1999)
- Space Ranger Roger (2017)
- Spookiz (2014–present)
- Storm Hawks (2007–2009)
- Strawberry Shortcake (2003–present)
- Street Sharks (1994–1997)
- Sunny Bunnies (2015–present)
- The Super Mario Bros. Super Show! (1989)
- Super Mario World (1991)
- Supernoobs (2015–2019)
- Super Why! (2007–2016)
- Super 10 (2022–present)
- Talking Tom & Friends (2014–2021)
- Teletubbies (1997–2018)
- The Wiggles (1993–present)
- Tobot (2010–2016)
- Topsy and Tim (2013–2015)
- Twirlywoos (2015–2017)
- Turbozaurs (2019-present)
- Vida the Vet (2023–present)
- Unicorn Academy (2023–present)
- The Wacky World of Tex Avery (1997)
- Waffle the Wonder Dog (2018–2020)
- Where on Earth Is Carmen Sandiego? (1994–1999)
- The Woody Woodpecker Show (1957–1977)
- Wimzie's House (1995–1996)
- Yo Gabba Gabba! (2007–2015)
- Zoboomafoo (1999–2001)
