= Higglytown Heroes =

American animated children's television series

- The show's promotional poster.
- Genre: Children's television series; Educational; Musical
- Created by: George Evelyn; Holly Huckins; Denis Morella; Kent Redeker; Jeff Ulin
- Directed by: George Evelyn; Denis Morella
- Voices of: Taylor Masamitsu; Frankie Manriquez; Liliana Mumy; Rory Thost; Edie McClurg; Dee Bradley Baker; Kevin Michael Richardson; Mindy Sterling; Jim Wise; Rachel York; Alanna Ubach; Valyn Hall; Lara Jill Miller
- Theme music composer: John Flansburgh; John Linnell
- Opening theme: "Here in Higglytown" (performed by They Might Be Giants)
- Composer: John Campbell
- Country of origin: United States
- Original language: English
- No. of seasons: 3
- No. of episodes: 65

Production
- Executive producer: Jeff Fino
- Producer: Nancy C. Evelyn
- Running time: 20 minutes
- Production companies: Wild Brain; Happy Nest

Original release
- Network: Playhouse Disney
- Release: September 13, 2004 – January 7, 2008

Higglytown Heroes is an American CGI-animated children's television series created by George Evelyn, Holly Huckins, Denis Morella, Kent Redeker, and Jeff Ulin. Produced by Wild Brain and Happy Nest, the series aired on the Playhouse Disney block on Disney Channel in the United States. The show's characters are shaped like Russian nesting dolls. In the show, four children named Eubie, Wayne, Twinkle, Kip, and their best friend, Fran the Squirrel, learn about all of the important jobs that people do in Higglytown. 65 episodes were produced.

The theme song of the show, Here in Higglytown, is performed by They Might Be Giants, which was also released on their second children's album Here Come the ABCs. After its series finale originally aired on January 7, 2008, reruns aired on Playhouse Disney until March 29, 2009. The show was originally planned to air on the rebranded Disney Junior block in 2011, but it didn't come to fruition. However, the Disney Junior 24/7 channel then aired it in reruns from March 23, 2012 until May 16, 2014. The show was added to Disney+ in April 2021. The Higglytown Heroes TV series was made using Alias Maya which was used to design models and textures for the 3D characters, and Photoshop which was used to create the 2D backgrounds and props.

== Plot ==
Each episode focuses primarily on different occupations and the problems that they solve; the characters with these occupations are referred to as "Heroes", due to both the work they do every day, as well as how they assist the characters with resolving conflicts. As the show is a musical, there are at least two songs every episode, relating to both the conflict and the Hero. Sometimes, Heroes may return in later episodes to assist the other characters, in order to demonstrate both effective teamwork, as well as how interconnected each occupation is within everyday life.

== Characters ==
- Eubie (voiced by Taylor Masamitsu) is the oldest of the gang. He lives with his aunt, uncle and their pet parrots. He is very kind and gentle and always finds the brighter side of any minor situation.
- Wayne (voiced by Frankie Manriquez) is Twinkle's older brother. He has an obsession with toast and sometimes he is dramatic in a situation.
- Twinkle (voiced by Liliana Mumy) is Wayne's younger sister. She tends to think of grand ideas that are usually shot down by Fran. She loves ballet dancing and she is the most artistic of the gang.
- Kip (voiced by Rory Thost) is the youngest of the gang. He is very spontaneous and full of energy. His catchphrase is "Well, what are we waiting for? Let's go, let's go, let's go!".
- Fran (voiced by Edie McClurg) is an adult red squirrel and is the neighbour of Kip. She usually acts as a chaperone and motherly figure for the kids. She is the only animal in the gang. Generally, she is sitting or standing up on Kip's head.

== Cast ==
=== Main voices ===
- Taylor Masamitsu as Eubie
- Frankie Manriquez as Wayne
- Liliana Mumy as Twinkle
- Rory Thost as Kip
- Edie McClurg as Fran
- Dee Bradley Baker as Pizza Guy
- Jamie-Lynn Sigler as Ms. Fern

=== Supporting voices ===
- Alanna Ubach - Plunkie, Mrs. Whiskers
- Kevin Michael Richardson - Uncle Lemmo
- Mindy Sterling - Aunt Mellie
- Dee Bradley Baker - Krank, Zooter
- Valyn Hall - Wiki & Tini (season 1)
- Lara Jill Miller - Wiki & Tini (seasons 2 and 3), Pookie (season 2)
- Jim Wise - Fripp
- Rachel York - Bitty
- Betty White - Grandma-Ma
- David Jeremiah - Grandpa-Pa
- Cicely Tyson and Gayla Goehl - Great Aunt Shirley

=== Guest voices ===
- Donald Faison as Firefighter Hero
- Kathie Lee Gifford as Mail Carrier Hero (Post Carrier Hero in UK dub)
- Camryn Manheim as Plumber Hero
- Steven Weber as Gardener Hero
- Katey Sagal as Policewoman Hero
- Frances Conroy as Veterinarian Hero
- Katrin Petersen - School Principal Hero
- Mark Therrell - Construction Worker Hero
- Jimmy Hayward - Military Career Hero
- Lance Bass as Electrician Hero
- John Michael Higgins as Tow Truck Driver Hero
- Tim Curry as Librarian Hero, Higgsquatch
- Cyndi Lauper as Telephone Operator Hero
- Jim Wise as Sanitation Worker Hero, Tour Guide Hero
- Susan Lucci as Weathergirl Hero
- Miguel Sandoval as Painter Hero
- Travis Tritt as Farmer Hero
- Ed McMahon as Tugboat Captain Hero
- Smokey Robinson as Grocery Clerk Hero
- Ricki Lake as Carpenter Hero (Alice)
- Stuart Pankin as Bus Driver Hero, Captain Steve
- Kirsten Peterson - Bus Aid Hero
- Wally Kurth as Eye Doctor Hero
- John Astin as Santa Claus
- Sean Astin as Pix the Elf
- Sharon Stone as Nicki the Blind Art Teacher
- Anne Heche as Gloria the Waitress
- Dee Bradley Baker as Egg Farmer Hero
- Matt Cavenaugh as Tailor Hero
- Raven-Symoné as Playground Monitor Hero
- Jesse Corti as Jax, Submarine Captain Hero
- Nathalia Hencker as Translator Hero
- David Naughton as Orchestra Conductor Hero
- Rocco DiSpirito as Baker Hero
- Steve Harris as Sports Coach Hero
- Marissa Jaret Winokur as Taxi Driver Hero
- Carlos Alazraqui as Shelter Worker Hero
- Irene Bedard as Forest Ranger Hero
- Henry Dittman as Detective Hero, Gardener, Sign Language Interpreter Hero, Higglytown Coast Guard Hero
- Erik Estrada as Ambulance Driver, Paramedic Hero
- Rob Paulsen as Barber Hero
- Mindy Sterling as Mrs. Barber, Musician Hero #2
- Diedrich Bader as Crane Operator Hero, Mr. Librarian
- Trace Adkins as Cowboy Hero
- Serena Williams as Snow Plow Driver Hero
- Thomas F. Wilson as Truck Driver Hero
- Phil LaMarr as Lifeguard Hero
- Gwendoline Yeo as Dentist Hero
- Wayne Brady as Doctor Hero
- Farrah Fawcett as School Nurse Hero
- Stacey Hendrickson - Pharmacist Hero
- Kate Pierson as Beekeeper Hero
- Maggie Wheeler as Street Sweeper Hero
- Alyson Reed as Zookeeper Hero
- Debbie Allen as Dance Instructor Hero
- Gregory Jbara as Tree Trimmer Hero
- Mo Collins as Science Fair Judge, Paleontologist Hero
- Simon Templeman as Banker Hero
- Philip Anthony-Rodriguez as Furnace Repairman Hero (Boiler Repairman Hero in UK dub)
- Jentle Phoenix as Environmentalist Hero
- Rain Pryor as Dr. Ferguson the Pediatrician Hero (Paediatrician Hero in UK dub)
- Wally Wingert as Waiter Hero, Hector the Donkey Guide Hero
- Dave Wittenberg as Mr. Baker, Sled Dog Musher
- Michael T. Weiss as Mountain Rescue Squad Hero
- Matthew St. Patrick as Police Man Hero
- Jane Kaczmarek as Astronaut Hero
- Jorge Garcia as Dog Trainer Hero
- Debi Mae West as Lighthouse Keeper Hero, Physical Therapist Hero
- Nicole Parker as Window Washer Hero
- Pete Siragusa as Ice Resurfacer Hero
- Roberto Alcaraz as Air Traffic Controller Hero
- Kathy Najimy as Photographer Hero
- Matthew Kaminsky as Drawbridge Operator Hero
- Matt Nolte - Caveman Hero
- David Jolliffe as Radiographer Hero
- Henry Winkler as Printer Hero
- Neil Kaplan as Mover Hero
- Joey Fatone as Bulldozer Operator Hero
- Jessica Walter as Motel Manager Hero
- Wilmer Valderrama as Helicopter Pilot Hero
- Leanza Cornett as Airplane Pilot Hero
- Gayla Goehl as Sheep Shearer Hero
- Frank Welker - Sheriff Hero
- Alanna Ubach as Babysitter Hero
- Jonathan Adams as Road Worker Hero
- Aisha Tyler as Museum Curator Hero
- Stephnie Weir as Animal Control Officer Hero
- Jess Harnell as Laundry Worker Hero
- Leslie Boone as Mechanic Hero, Bessy the Cow, Farmer Lulu, Dump Truck Driver Hero
- Meghan Strange as Camp Counselor Hero
- Bill Farmer as Janitor Hero Jay (Caretaker Hero Craig in UK dub)
- Billy Vera as Ferry Boat Captain Hero
- Charlie Schlatter as Receptionist Hero
- David Jeremiah as Mapmaker Hero
- Catero Colbert as Camel Rider
- Tom Kenny as Reporter Hero
- Dee Bradley Baker, Mindy Sterling, & Alanna Ubach as Musician Heroes
- Jeff Bennett as Auctioneer Hero
- Michael T. Weiss as Country Veterinarian Hero
- Julianne Grossman as Roofer Hero
- Jon Curry as Allergist Hero
- J. Grant Albrecht as Locksmith Hero
- J. P. Manoux as Bike Repair Hero
- Scott McShane as Bridge Builder Hero
- Jo Anne Worley as Customer Service Clerk Hero
- John O'Hurley as Freight Train Engineer Hero
- Bobby Holiday as House Painter Hero
- Kevin Michael Richardson as Uncle Lemmo the Short-Order Cook Hero
- Charlie Janasz as Photographer Hero
- Kimberly Brooks as Ski Patrol Hero
- Jeffrey Tambor as Radio Announcer
- Wes Brown as Phone Repairman Hero
- Debra Wilson Skelton as Marine Biologist Hero
- Chris Carmack as Referee Hero
- Joey Gian as Stan the Bricklayer Man Hero
- They Might Be Giants as The Supertasters
- Shawn King as Usher Hero
- Ruth Williamson - Cafeteria Lady Hero
- Anna Maria Perez de Tagle as Shelby the Safety Patroller Hero

== Episodes ==
=== Series overview ===
Season	Episodes	Originally released	
Season	Episodes	First released	Last released
1	26	September 13, 2004	August 8, 2005
2	13	November 15, 2005	July 25, 2006
3	26	September 4, 2006	January 7, 2008

=== Season 1 (2004–2005) ===
No. overall	No. in season	Title	Written by	Storyboarded by	Original release date	Prod. code
1	1	"Up a Tree"	Holly Huckins & Kent Redeker	Leah Waldron	September 13, 2004	101
1	1	"Missing Grandpop (aka "Missing Grandad")"	Kent Redeker	George Evelyn	September 13, 2004	101
The kids need to rescue Kip from a tree. Eubie is sad when Grandpop has to leave and go home.
2	2	"Twinkle Tooth"	Cate Lieuwen	John Korellis	September 20, 2004	102
2	2	"Flower Power"	Peter Gaffney	Leah Waldron	September 20, 2004	102
Twinkle loses her tooth. Eubie's flower keeps drooping.
3	3	"Smells Like a Mystery"	Ford Riley	Nick Hewitt	October 11, 2004	103
3	3	"Ship Ahoy!"	Peter Gaffney	Halo Pictures	October 11, 2004	103
Kip's dad's hot dog cart goes missing. The group gets marooned on an island.
4	4	"Halloween Heroes (aka "Higgly Halloween")"	Kent Redeker	William Reiss	October 25, 2004	104
Wayne & Twinkle's Uncle Lemmo tells a story on Halloween.
5	5	"Soup with Stars"	Jule Selbo	Kinjo Estioko	November 1, 2004	105
5	5	"The Happy Friendly Sparkly Toast Club"	Kent Redeker	Tom Nesbitt	November 1, 2004	105
The kids try to find stars for soup with stars tonight. Inspired by their friends' club, the kids scramble to make their own.
6	6	"Catch Up with Ketchup"	Peggy Sarlin	Halo Pictures	November 8, 2004	106
6	6	"Star Struck"	Cate Lieuwen	Nick Hewitt	November 8, 2004	106
The kids must bring ketchup to Kip's dad's hot dog stand. Wayne breaks his glasses during a shooting star watch.
7	7	"First Snow"	Peggy Sarlin	William Reiss	November 15, 2004	107
7	7	"Snow Dazed"	Cate Lieuwen	Halo Pictures	November 15, 2004	107
The kids' winter clothes are too small for them. The kids can't get home due to all the snow.
8	8	"Flappy's Not Happy"	Jeff Kindley	Kinjo Estioko	November 22, 2004	108
8	8	"An Electric Evening"	Ford Riley	William Reiss	November 22, 2004	108
Eubie gets a new bird who looks sad. A fuse blows on the night of the kids' favorite show.
9	9	"All Tire'd Out"	Holly Huckins	Achiu So	December 6, 2004	109
9	9	"Great Un-Expectations"	Kent Redeker	Leah Waldron	December 6, 2004	109
On the way to the beach, the car has a flat tire. A librarian helps the kids learn about interesting creatures in the backyard.
10	10	"Twinkle's Wish"	Holly Huckins & Cate Lieuwen	Tom Nesbitt	December 13, 2004	110
Santa's elf named Pix makes Twinkle's Christmas wish come true.
11	11	"Smooth Operator"	Peter Gaffney	Kinjo Estioko	December 13, 2004	111
11	11	"Stinky Situation"	Holly Huckins	William Reiss	December 13, 2004	111
Kip's grandpa gets locked in the bathroom. The kids rake leaves.
12	12	"Weather or Not"	Chris Nee	Romy Garcia	December 20, 2004	112
12	12	"Green in the Gills"	Steve Viksten	Leah Waldron	December 20, 2004	112
Fran's barrel is blown away by the wind. Kip makes his special card for his sick mom.
13	13	"Twinkle's Masterpiece"	Susan Kim	Halo Pictures	January 3, 2005	113
13	13	"The Egg-cellent Adventure"	Holly Huckins	Tom Nesbitt	January 3, 2005	113
Twinkle makes a masterpiece. When the diner runs out of eggs, the kids must find more.
14	14	"Wayne's Ripping Adventure"	Ford Riley	Kinjo Estioko	January 8, 2005	114
14	14	"Meet Eubie's Cousin"	Peggy Sarlin	Norman Quebedeau	January 8, 2005	114
Wayne has ripped his pants, and Twinkle's recital is fast approaching! Eubie's cousin is introduced at the playground.
15	15	"Say What?"	Steve Viksten	Kinjo Estioko	January 17, 2005	115
15	15	"Higgly Harmonies"	Kent Redeker	William Reiss	January 17, 2005	115
A new kid comes to school, but she only speaks Spanish. The kids start their own band.
16	16	"Wayne's Good Guess"	Jule Selbo	Tom Nesbitt	January 31, 2005	116
16	16	"Wayne's 100 Special Somethings"	Holly Huckins	Marcelo de Souza	January 31, 2005	116
The kids try to win a jar of jellybeans. On the 100th day of school, the kids must bring in 100 of something.
17	17	"Patty Cake"	Rachelle Romberg	Achiu So	February 7, 2005	117
17	17	"Havin' a Ball"	Susan Kim	Leah Waldron	February 7, 2005	117
The kids scramble to find more bread for their picnic. The kids play ball.
18	18	"Bright Sights, Big City"	Ford Riley	Marcelo de Souza	March 21, 2005	118
18	18	"Kip's Shadow"	Cate Lieuwen & Sharon Schatz-Rosenthal	William Reiss	March 21, 2005	118
The kids can't wait to see the monster show at Higgly Biggly City! Kip meets his dog named Shadow.
19	19	"Fran Takes a Hike"	Cate Lieuwen	William Reiss	April 4, 2005	119
19	19	"Mystery at Kip's House"	Story by : Steve Viksten; Teleplay by : Jule Selbo	Norman Quebedeau	April 4, 2005	119
The kids go visit Fran's old home in the forest. A strange noise is coming from somewhere in Kip's house.
20	20	"Kip Joins the Circus"	Kent Redeker	Kinjo Estioko	May 9, 2005	120
20	20	"Baby Boom"	Peggy Sarlin	Marcelo De Souza	May 9, 2005	120
The kids have a circus on the playground. Mr. Barber and his wife are having a baby.
21	21	"Twinkle's Favorite Author"	Susan Kim	Marcelo De Souza	May 23, 2005	121
21	21	"Don't Fence Me In"	Peter Gaffney	Kinjo Estioko	May 23, 2005	121
Twinkle can't wait to have a favorite author. Uncle Lemmo and his neighbor have an argument.
22	22	"Higgly Hoedown"	Peter Gaffney	Halo Pictures	June 27, 2005	122
22	22	"Eubie's Turbo Sled"	Kent Redeker	Marcelo De Souza	June 27, 2005	122
A cow gets in everyone's way to the annual hoedown. Eubie gets a sled.
23	23	"Kip's Sweet Tooth"	Chris Nee	Patricia Ross	July 4, 2005	123
23	23	"Wayne's Lollipop"	Jule Selbo	Halo Pictures	July 4, 2005	123
Kip's tooth gets cold. Wayne's lollipop gets stuck on his head.
24	24	"Higgly Frog Day"	Kent Redeker	Tom Nesbitt	July 11, 2005	125
24	24	"Eubie's Ele-Fantastic Adventure"	Kent Redeker	William Reiss	July 11, 2005	125
Today is Frog Day, the day where all frogs come back to the swamp. The kids can't wait to go the zoo and see elephants.
25	25	"Kip's Dad Gets a Strike"	Kent Redeker	Nick Hewitt	July 18, 2005	126
25	25	"A Really Hot Day"	Holly Huckins	Patricia Ross	July 18, 2005	126
When Kip's dad's bowling ball breaks in half, the kids must get him a new one. The kids try to get cool on a hot day.
26	26	"Eubie's Pink Dots"	Laura McCreary	William Reiss	August 8, 2005	124
26	26	"Two Bees or Not Two Bees"	Holly Huckins	Halo Pictures	August 8, 2005	124
Eubie has pink dots when he touches Higgly-ivy. When the kids search for berries, they learn about bees.

=== Season 2 (2005–2006) ===
No. overall	No. in season	Title	Written by	Storyboarded by	Original release date
27	1	"Twinkle, Twinkle Little Fish"	Peggy Sarlin	Leah Waldron	November 15, 2005
27	1	"All the Wrong Moves"	Ford Riley	Patricia Ross	November 15, 2005
Wayne & Twinkle's mom, Plunkie, goes to the beach with the Higgly kids. Eubie, Wayne and Kip immediately jump into the water! Only, Twinkle doesn't want to go in because she doesn't want to wet her pom-pom hair. Plunkie gives her a swampy glitter bathing cap that she made especially for Twinkle. But then, a seagull and a dolphin steal the bathing cap, and the dolphin accidentally swooped her bathing cap deep in the water. But then, a submarine captain helps them get Twinkle's bathing cap back. Eubie receives a letter from his cousin, Ooba, who invites him to her wedding. At first Eubie is very happy, but when Aunt Mellie tells him that he also has to dance there, he then faces a problem. Eubie can't dance!
28	2	"Kip Gets Swing Fever"	Cate Lieuwen	Tom Nesbitt	November 28, 2005
28	2	"Wayne's Pieces of Gold"	Susan Kim	Glenn Hill	November 28, 2005
When the kids get tire swings, the tree they are on tilts from all the weight. Wayne has to figure out a way to save ten pieces of gold so he can eventually buy a special toaster.
29	3	"All Warm Inside"	Kent Redeker	Glen Hill	January 30, 2006
29	3	"Calling All Ducks"	Cate Lieuwen	Tom Nesbitt	January 30, 2006
When the kids return from the cold snow, they find that the furnace is broken. Aunt Mellie and Uncle Zooter play music to count how many ducks are in the lake, but suddenly it gets filled with oil.
30	4	"The Totally Secret Valentine"	Jule Selbo	Izabela Melamed	February 13, 2006
30	4	"A Valentine for Miss Fern"	Peggy Sarlin	Leah Waldron	February 13, 2006
Miss Fern and the kids try to find out who everyone's Valentine. The electrician has a surprise for Miss Fern.
31	5	"Cry Baby Pookie"	Holly Huckins	Patricia Ross	March 6, 2006
31	5	"Wait for Me"	Kent Redeker	Patricia Ross	March 6, 2006
When Kip's baby sister Pookie's first birthday comes along, his mother Bitty and his friends prepare a birthday party for her, but she suddenly starts crying, and can't seem to stop. Can they find a way to make her feel better? As a reward for saving his hat, the Baker invites Eubie and his friends to a fancy French restaurant, but they can't understand the names of the dishes in their menus, as they are in foreign languages. Luckily, the Waiter comes along to help them out.
32	6	"The Legend of Higgsquatch"	Peter Gaffney	Leah Waldron	March 11, 2006
Kip's dad takes the kids camping and tells them about a mysterious hairy beast called Higgsquatch. The next morning, they see signs that it may have visited them.
33	7	"Balloon-a-Palooza"	Holly Huckins	Glen Hill	March 20, 2006
33	7	"Wayne's Day Out"	Laura McCreary	Dan McHale	March 20, 2006
Aunt Shirley and the kids get stuck on a mountain after an accident with a hot air balloon. Wayne wanders off during a fair and gets lost.
34	8	"Wayne's Big Big Discovery"	Jule Selbo	Patricia Ross	April 3, 2006
34	8	"Dirigible Day"	Ford Riley	Leah Waldron	April 3, 2006
While the kids are planting seeds, Wayne finds his white object in the ground Uncle Zeke cannot land his plane.
35	9	"The Fran in the Moon"	Peter Gaffney & David Pitlik	Dan McHale & Patricia Ross	May 8, 2006
Fran accidentally gets sent to the moon.
36	10	"Me and My Shadow"	Peggy Sarlin	Patricia Ross	June 12, 2006
36	10	"Out to Sea"	Jack Monaco	Patricia Ross	June 12, 2006
Kip's dog, Shadow, has been behaving very badly. During a day at sea, the kids learn about safety and find treasure.
37	11	"Don't Wayne on My Parade"	William H.K. Mooney & David Pitlik	Leah Waldron	July 3, 2006
37	11	"Twinkle's Terrific Twirl"	Chris Nee	Leah Waldron	July 3, 2006
Uncle Pete's windows are very dirty you can't see through them. The ice rink is turning into slushy mush.
38	12	"Eubie's Big Boat Float"	Holly Huckins	Dan McHale	July 17, 2006
38	12	"A Slippery Situation"	Jack Monaco	Glen Hill	July 17, 2006
Each Higgly kid makes their own craft to sail across the Higgisippi River. Kip accidentally slips and hurts his arm.
39	13	"Kip's Rocket Rescue"	Story by : George Evelyn; Teleplay by : Peter Gaffney	Patricia Ross	July 25, 2006
39	13	"Let's Get Movin'"	Kent Redeker	Izabela Melamed	July 25, 2006
Kip's dad, Fripp and the kids launch a rocket that doesn't return. The kids have a lot of fun helping Grandpa-pa move.

=== Season 3 (2006–2008) ===
No. overall	No. in season	Title	Written by	Storyboarded by	Original release date
40	1	"Corn to Be Wild"	Story by : Lisa Kettle; Teleplay by : Holly Huckins	Leah Waldron	September 4, 2006
40	1	"Overnight Moose"	Kent Redeker	Patricia Ross	September 4, 2006
Eubie, Wayne, Twinkle and Kip help Eubie's Grandpop Krank harvest corn on his farm. While Aunt Mellie and Uncle Zooter prepare the delicious corn cob banquet for the picnic, the friends go to the pond and swim. But when they want to go back to the courtyard, a huge boulder blocks their way. But then, the bulldozer operator comes to the scene. He simply pushes the rock aside with his bulldozer. As a thank you, he's invited to the picnic. Eubie, Wayne, Twinkle, Kip and Fran drive with Uncle Lemmo to the impressive Moose Monument, a huge mountain in the shape of a moose head. After an eventful day, it finally starts to rain and they drive back home, but unfortunately the bridge is flooded. It's a good thing the motel exists, thanks to our friend, the motel manager. Our friends can spend the night there, wait for the rain, and drive home the next morning.
41	2	"Higgly Islands"	Kent Redeker	Leah Waldron	September 24, 2006
It is bitterly cold and snowy in Higglytown. But then, five friends (And Fripp, Kip's Dad), get a letter from Uncle Zeke, that says that Uncle Zeke invites them all to the Higgly Islands. On the first day, Wayne finds a crown on the beach. But as soon as he puts them on, strange things happen to him! When everyone gets cursed, they decide to get rid of the crown as soon as possible. The crown is indeed cursed and only those who solve three tasks can break the curse!
42	3	"Shear Luck"	Laura McCreary & Sharon Schatz-Rosenthal	Glen Hill	October 16, 2006
42	3	"Big Night Out"	Kent Redeker	Izabela Melamed	October 16, 2006
Eubie, Wayne, Twinkle, Kip and Fran are so excited, because every year, the “Biggest, Tallest, Longest” day is held in Higglytown. On this day everyone brings something with them, and puts on something that should be the biggest, the tallest or the longest so that they win. Kip's grandma-ma tries to knit the longest scarf for the kids that has ever been in Higglytown. But suddenly, the wool is all gone. Then, a sheep shearer rushes to their aid and makes new wool for Kip's grandma-ma. In conclusion, the Higgly kids win the prize for the longest scarf. Aunt Mellie, Uncle Zooter, Fripp, Bitty and Plunkie are very happy when they learn that the hit musical "I Love You and Your Kangaroo Too!" is taking place today in Higglytown. But the problem is: When they want to buy tickets, they are all sold out. But, Pizza Guy has an idea. Everyone in Higglytown takes part in a Go-Go Spring competition. Those who can jump the longest on their Go-Go springs win five tickets to the musical. But, there's another problem: Who is going to watch over the Higgly kids? Chaos stops when a cheerful teenage babysitter comes to the kids' aid.
43	4	"Calling All Cars!"	Susan Kim	Glen Hill	October 23, 2006
43	4	"Amazing Museum"	Ford Riley	Dan McHale	October 23, 2006
Eubie, Wayne, Twinkle, Kip and Fran are allowed to drive through a car wash with Fripp. The Higgly kids enthusiastically build their own car and drive it on the sidewalk through the city. But when they want to cross a street, they discover a broken spot on the road. But then, the road workers come to the rescue. They come and repair the street so that all cars can continue safely. Eubie, Wayne, Twinkle, Kip and Fran play knights and dragons. When they learn that an exhibition about old knight's armor has been set up in the museum, they really want to go there. But there's a lot more art to be seen in the museum: birds, toast, and ballerinas. After a while, the Higgly kids get lost, and can no longer find the knight's department. The museum curator of the museum leads them there and explains the individual departments along the way, until they finally arrive at the knight's armor.
44	5	"Frozen Fish Follies"	Holly Huckins	Dan McHale	November 6, 2006
44	5	"Look Who's Squawking"	Laura McCreary	Izabela Melamed	November 6, 2006
Ferdy, who lives in the icy far north, invites Pizza Guy and the Higgly kids to ice fish. Pizza Guy catches a huge fish, and wants to take it to Higglytown. But it is not that simple. His pizza copter is frozen, and now they can't fly back home. A dog sled musher and his sled dogs come to their aid and bring everyone back to Higglytown. The Five higgly-friends and Uncle Lemmo want to plant a flower bed in Lemmo's garden. They diligently prepare everything, and then they buy seeds from the nursery. They start sowing, but all of a sudden, many penguins are sitting in their garden. Nobody knows where they come from, and nobody knows how to get rid of them. The kids can't plant like that! It's good that an animal control officer comes by and brings the lost penguins back to the zoo.
45	6	"Wayne's Day to Shine"	Peggy Sarlin	Patricia Ross	November 20, 2006
45	6	"Wayne Listens Up"	Susan Kim	Leah Waldron	November 20, 2006
46	7	"A Hoppin' Poppin' Problem"	Jule Selbo	Patricia Ross	November 27, 2006
46	7	"Hay Hay Hay!"	Story by : Denis Morella; Teleplay by : Kent Redeker	Dalton Grant	November 27, 2006
47	8	"Happy Campers"	Sharon Schatz-Rosenthal	Leah Waldron	January 1, 2007
47	8	"All Washed Out"	Susan Kim	Glen Hill	January 1, 2007
48	9	"Hats All Folks!"	Story by : Lisa Kettle; Teleplay by : Holly Huckins	Dan McHale	January 8, 2007
48	9	"Hop-Hop Hooray"	Cate Lieuwen	Leah Waldron	January 8, 2007
49	10	"Shuffleboard Buddies"	William H.K. Mooney & David Pitlik	Patricia Ross	January 15, 2007
49	10	"All Mapped Out"	Kent Redeker	Dalton Grant	January 15, 2007
50	11	"12-Pie Abe"	Cate Lieuwen	Leah Waldron	January 22, 2007
50	11	"The Day the Diner Stood Still"	Laura McCreary	Dalton Grant	January 22, 2007
51	12	"Saturday Night Higgly"	Holly Huckins & Lisa Kettle	Leah Waldron	January 29, 2007
51	12	"Monster Sandwiches"	Cate Lieuwen	Patricia Ross	January 29, 2007
52	13	"Buki-Buki Boo Boo"	Kent Redeker	Dan McHale	February 19, 2007
52	13	"Signs of Spring"	Jack Monaco	Patricia Ross	February 19, 2007
53	14	"The Big Pink Elephant Sale"	William H.K. Mooney & David Pitlik	Leah Waldron	March 12, 2007
53	14	"Higglies on Horseback"	Cate Lieuwen	Cullen Blaine	March 12, 2007
54	15	"Easy to Get Sneezy"	Peggy Sarlin	Tom Nesbitt	March 26, 2007
54	15	"Unlock the Magic"	Jack Monaco	Tom Nesbitt	March 26, 2007
55	16	"Wayne's Cycle Recycle"	Susan Kim	Lyndon Ruddy	April 2, 2007
55	16	"Wayne's Wet Pet"	Kent Redeker	Cullen Blaine	April 2, 2007
56	17	"X Marks the Spot!"	Holly Huckins	Leah Waldron	May 7, 2007
56	17	"Eubie's View"	Kent Redeker	Tom Nesbitt	May 7, 2007
57	18	"Little Big Fish"	Steve Sullivan & Andy Guerdat	Leah Waldron	May 21, 2007
57	18	"Good Sports"	Laura McCreary	Tom Nesbitt	May 21, 2007
Eubie's allowed to go fishing with his Uncle Zooter and Aunt Mellie, and his friends Wayne, Twinkle, Kip and Fran. But to everyone's surprise, Kip actually catches a whale. As it turns out, the whale is a baby and the baby had got lost in the river. But even Pizza Guy, with his sardine pizza, can't lure the whale back into the sea. Then comes a marine biologist. With the help of an underwater microphone, she can tell the whale where to swim. When they finally reach the open sea, the whale mother is very happy to see her child healthy again. When tidying up, Fripp cleans the attic, looks for his bowling ball and finds a box of colored chalk. When he tells the kids that he used it to paint pictures on the sidewalk, Eubie, Wayne, Twinkle, Kip and Fran start to paint pictures enthusiastically. But when the chalks are used up, only a piece is left.
58	19	"Wing-A-Ding Whirly Box"	Steve Sullivan & Andy Guerdat	Leah Waldron	May 28, 2007
58	19	"Windy Watchers"	Kent Redeker	Cullen Blaine	May 28, 2007
59	20	"Choo Choo Zucchini"	Lisa Kettle	Natalie Long	June 25, 2007
59	20	"Something Ducky Going On"	Cate Lieuwen	Eunju Newhouse	June 25, 2007
60	21	"Fripp's Flip Flap Flop"	Peggy Sarlin	Leah Waldron	July 2, 2007
60	21	"Say Cheese"	Chris Nee	Leah Waldron	July 2, 2007
61	22	"Canyon Capers"	Story by : Denis Morella; Teleplay by : Holly Huckins & Lisa Kettle	Tom Nesbitt	July 9, 2007
61	22	"High-Country Hiccups"	Ashley Mendoza	Brian Kindregan	July 9, 2007
62	23	"Calling All Heroes!"	Susan Kim	Tom Nesbitt	August 13, 2007
Wayne's outdoor birthday party is interrupted by a pizza dough storm.
63	24	"Happy Flappy Birthday"	William H.K. Mooney & David Pitlik	Leah Waldron	September 10, 2007
63	24	"The Cuckoo County Caw-Caw Contest"	Kent Redeker	Tom Nesbitt	September 10, 2007
64	25	"'Tis the Season to Be Snowy"	Holly Huckins	Eunju Newhouse	December 2, 2007
64	25	"Bingo Bongos"	Kent Redeker	Patricia Ross	December 2, 2007
There's a heat wave in Higglytown two days before Christmas. But then, Pizza Guy invites the kids and their parents to his hut in the mountains. There's a lot of snow there. Once there, the kids decorate the Christmas tree and hang fairy lights. But when they want to hang up their Christmas stockings for Santa, they discover that there's no fireplace in Pizza Guy's hut. Pizza Guy is desperate. He had completely forgotten that! But then, Stan the bricklayer Hero comes to their aid and builds a chimney through which Santa Claus can come at night! The rock band 'The Supertasters' want to give a concert in Higglytown, but unfortunately their drummer, Marty, is sick. Since Fran is a great bongo drummer, The Supertasters invite her to play the concert with them, so that they don't have to cancel it.
65	26	"Wayne's Toasty Invention"	Holly Huckins	Eunju Newhouse	January 7, 2008
65	26	"Spell It Safe"	Cate Lieuwen	Cullen Blaine	January 7, 2008
Miss Fern explains to the kids in kindergarten how inventions came around. People have always needed something urgently and that's why they've become inventive. Of course, the Higgly kids all want to invent something immediately, but Wayne is unhappy. No matter what he invents, it's already been invented. By chance, he invents a new toast creation at lunch. The next day he takes toast with banana on raisins for all the kids at kindergarten. It tastes so good, that they eat all toasts! But oh dear, Wayne doesn't have lunch now! His friends offer to share their break with him, but nobody has a toast with them. What are they supposed to do now? How good that the lunch lady comes to the rescue! Kip's twin sisters, Wiki and Tini, who go to school for older children, take part in a spelling bee. Ms. Fern decides to go with the kids to watch. But then Five Higgly-friends get lost in the big school.
