= Poochini =

- Genre: Comedy; Slice of life; Adventure; Animated sitcom; Slapstick
- Created by: Dave Thomas
- Developed by: Robin Steele
- Directed by: Dave Thomas; Dave Marshall
- Starring: see voice cast
- Composers: Rusty Andrews; Brad Carow; Bill Fulton; John Gonzalez
- Countries of origin: United States; Germany; Netherlands
- Original language: English
- No. of seasons: 1
- No. of episodes: 26 (78 segments)

Production
- Executive producers: Ian Ensslen; Jeff Fino; Dr. Sylvia Rothblum
- Producers: Thomas Haffa; Kaye Robinson; Dr. Sylvia Rothblum; Jeffrey C. Ulin
- Running time: 22 minutes (7 minutes per segment)
- Production companies: Wild Brain; EM.TV; Wavery B.V. Production

Original release
- Network: Syndication
- Release: February 2, 2000 – March 1, 2003

Poochini (also known as Poochini's Yard) is an animated television series which was originally aired worldwide on February 2, 2000, but it did not air in the United States until September 7, 2002. The series follows the life of a grey black-eared hound mix named Poochini who runs away from home after his rich owner dies, gets captured by the dog pound and is adopted by an average American family.

Despite being created and co-produced by the San Francisco-based entertainment company Wild Brain, Poochini was not shown in the United States for over two years after its production. Co-produced and internationally distributed by Munich-based media group EM.TV and distributed by The Television Syndication Company for US syndication, Poochini is based on the award-winning pilot short A Dog Cartoon (1999).

Poochini only made 26 episodes with the final one airing in the United States on March 1, 2003.

It was directed by Dave Marshall and Dave Thomas. The series was one of the final projects of famed background artist Maurice Noble (who mostly worked with Looney Tunes and Tom and Jerry animator Chuck Jones), who is credited as a design and color consultant, before his death in 2001.

== Characters ==
The White Family

- Poochini (voiced by Billy West) - Truly a well-trained Italian dog. Just like his young American dog master named Billy White, he can get into a large amount of trouble but has enough brains to escape the situation.
- Billy White (voiced by Dee Bradley Baker) - A mischievous and kind-hearted kid. He is a good owner to his Italian dog named Poochini.
- Walter White (voiced by Billy West) - the father of Billy White and the husband of Wendy White.
- Wendy White (voiced by Leslie Carrara-Rudolph) - the mother of the Whites Family.

== Voice cast ==
- Billy West - Poochini, Walter White, Mr. Garvey, Lockjaw
- Dee Bradley Baker - Billy White, Bunk, Knucklehead, Snubnose
- Maurice LaMarche - Dirt
- Leslie Carrara-Rudolph - Wendy White
- Jeff Bennett - Additional Voices
- John Cygan - Additional Voices

== Episodes ==
All episodes directed by Dave Marshall and Dave Thomas.

No.	Title	Written by	Storyboard by	Airdate (US)
1	Abandoned	Matt Wayne	Jim Smith	September 7, 2002
1	The Gopher	Richard Carradine & Benny Coma	Lyndon Ruddy	September 7, 2002
1	The Cone	Richard Carradine & Benny Coma	John Korellis	September 7, 2002
2	Squeaky Fromage	Matt Wayne	John Martin	September 14, 2002
2	Puppy Obey	Richard Purcell	Ian Freedman	September 14, 2002
2	Christmas Tree	Robert Montalbano	Glen Lovett	September 14, 2002
3	Peanut Butter	Richard Carradine & Benny Coma	Glen Lovett	September 21, 2002
3	The Visitor	Matt Wayne	Lyndon Ruddy	September 21, 2002
3	Flea Collar	Robert Montalbano	John Korellis	September 21, 2002
4	Dog Wanted	Robert Montalbano	Carlos Baeza	September 28, 2002
4	Pleasant Puppy Dreams	Richard Purcell	Glen Lovett	September 28, 2002
4	Stray Dog	Richard Carradine & Benny Coma	Li Hong	September 28, 2002
5	The Tail	Richard Carradine & Benny Coma	Simon O'Leary	October 5, 2002
5	Albino Alligator	Richard Carradine & Benny Coma	Chris Hauge	October 5, 2002
5	Dog Show	Richard Carradine & Benny Coma	Lyndon Ruddy	October 5, 2002
6	Mad Dog on Duty	Robert Montalbano	Ian Freedman	October 12, 2002
6	The Baldness	Richard Carradine & Benny Coma	Carlos Baeza	October 12, 2002
6	Doggie Day Afternoon	Robert Montalbano	John Korellis	October 12, 2002
7	Foamer	Robert Montalbano	John Martin	October 19, 2002
7	The Dog House of Tomorrow	Matt Wayne	Glen Lovett	October 19, 2002
7	Puppy Love	Robert Montalbano	Li Hong	October 19, 2002
8	Extreme Poochini Wrestling	Richard Purcell	Simon O'Leary	October 26, 2002
8	The Guru	Charles Schneider	Lyndon Ruddy	October 26, 2002
8	Psychic Dog	Richard Carradine & Benny Coma	Carlos Baeza	October 26, 2002
9	Barking Orders	Robert Montalbano	Li Hong	November 2, 2002
9	Fallout Shelter	Charles Schneider	Maxwell Atoms	November 2, 2002
9	Leash Law	Charles Schneider	Ian Freedman	November 2, 2002
10	The Checkers Dog	Richard Carradine & Benny Coma	John Martin	November 9, 2002
10	Dog Pile	Robert Montalbano	Glen Lovett	November 9, 2002
10	The Skunk	Richard Carradine & Benny Coma	David Feiss	November 9, 2002
11	Bone Sweet Bone	Charles Schneider	Carlos Baeza	November 16, 2002
11	Three Bad Dogs	Matt Wayne	Simon O'Leary	November 16, 2002
11	Pyro Pooch	Robert Montalbano	Lyndon Ruddy	November 16, 2002
12	Amnesiac Dog	Richard Carradine & Benny Coma	Maxwell Atoms	November 23, 2002
12	Massive Hounds	Robert Montalbano	Li Hong	November 23, 2002
12	Pet Smells	Matt Wayne	Ian Freedman	November 23, 2002
13	Freak Week	Charles Schneider	Glen Lovett	November 30, 2002
13	Meat Madness	Ariel Prendergast	Chris Hauge	November 30, 2002
13	Vomitron	Richard Pursel	John Martin	November 30, 2002
14	Piranha	Charles Schneider	Ian Freedman	December 7, 2002
14	League of Dogs	Richard Pursel	Maxwell Atoms	December 7, 2002
14	Hosed	Ariel Prendergast	Chris Hauge	December 7, 2002
15	Heatwave	Ariel Prendergast	Carlos Baeza	December 14, 2002
15	Love Cats	Robert Montalbano	John Martin	December 14, 2002
15	Tar Dog	Richard Carradine & Benny Coma	Glen Lovett	December 14, 2002
16	Night of Terror	Charles Schneider	Carlos Baeza	December 21, 2002
16	Queen Bee	Richard Carradine & Benny Coma	David Feiss	December 21, 2002
16	Remote Control	Ariel Prendergast	Li Hong	December 21, 2002
17	Diva Dog	Richard Pursel	Stephen DeStefano	December 28, 2002
17	Poolside Poochini	Ariel Prendergast	Chris Hauge	December 28, 2002
17	Newsboy Rampage	Matt Wayne	Larry Scholl	December 28, 2002
18	Coffee Dog	Richard Carradine & Benny Coma	Maxwell Atoms	January 4, 2003
18	Robot Dog	Richard Carradine & Benny Coma	Li Hong	January 4, 2003
18	Bed Time	Richard Carradine & Benny Coma	Ian Freedman	January 4, 2003
19	Garden Guardian	Ariel Prendergast	Chris Hauge	January 11, 2003
19	Hurricane Poochini	Ariel Prendergast	Ian Freedman	January 11, 2003
19	Yard Sale of the Century	Matt Wayne	Li Hong	January 11, 2003
20	A Hound in One	Ariel Prendergast	Glen Lovett	January 18, 2003
20	Poochersize	Ariel Prendergast	John Martin	January 18, 2003
20	Super Hearing Dog	Robert Montalbano	Chris Hauge	January 18, 2003
21	Boning Up	Robert Montalbano	Mike Stern	January 25, 2003
21	Night Crawlers	Ariel Prendergast	Maxwell Atoms	January 25, 2003
21	The Flying Dog	Richard Carradine & Benny Coma	Glen Lovett	January 25, 2003
22	Recyclers	Ariel Prendergast	Larry Scholl	February 1, 2003
22	Chili Dog	Robert Montalbano	Maxwell Atoms	February 1, 2003
22	You Dirty Rat	Charles Schneider	Carlos Baeza	February 1, 2003
23	The Dogsitter	Ariel Prendergast	Aaron Springer	February 8, 2003
23	The Servant	Ariel Prendergast	Chris Hauge	February 8, 2003
23	Phobic Family	Richard Carradine & Benny Coma	Carlos Baeza	February 8, 2003
24	Carry On	Robert Montalbano	Maxwell Atoms	February 15, 2003
24	Dognapped	Robert Montalbano	Ed Bell	February 15, 2003
24	Hi-Class Hi-Jinx	Charles Schneider	Ian Freedman	February 15, 2003
25	Nurture Dog	Richard Carradine & Benny Coma	Li Hong	February 22, 2003
25	Whitesylvania Forever	Matt Wayne	Chris Hauge	February 22, 2003
25	Born Again Dog	Richard Carradine & Benny Coma	Glen Lovett	February 22, 2003
26	Butterfly Season	Ariel Prendergast	Aaron Springer	March 1, 2003
26	Leaf Me Alone	Ariel Prendergast	Maxwell Atoms	March 1, 2003
26	Paranoid Dog	Richard Carradine & Benny Coma	Carlos Baeza	March 1, 2003
